= List of Asian Games medalists in canoeing =

This is the complete list of Asian Games medalists in canoeing from 1990 to 2026.

== Slalom ==
=== Men ===
==== C-1 ====
Games	Gold	Silver	Bronze
2010 Guangzhou	Teng Zhiqiang (CHN)	Takuya Haneda (JPN)	Chen Fangjia (CHN)
2014 Incheon	Takuya Haneda (JPN)	Chang Yun-chuan (TPE)	Wang Xiaodong (CHN)
2018 Jakarta–Palembang	Takuya Haneda (JPN)	Chen Fangjia (CHN)	Alexandr Kulikov (KAZ)
2022 Hangzhou	Xie Yuancong (CHN)	Anvar Klevleev (UZB)	Alexandr Kulikov (KAZ)
2026 Aichi–Nagoya	Zhang Zhicheng (CHN)	Wu Jung-cheng (TPE)	Piyanath Koetsuk (THA)

==== C-2 ====
Games	Gold	Silver	Bronze
2010 Guangzhou	China (CHN); Hu Minghai; Shu Junrong	China (CHN); Chen Fei; Shan Bao	Uzbekistan (UZB); Aleksey Zubarev; Aleksey Naumkin

==== K-1 ====
Games	Gold	Silver	Bronze
2010 Guangzhou	Huang Cunguang (CHN)	Kazuki Yazawa (JPN)	Xian Jinbin (CHN)
2014 Incheon	Kazuya Adachi (JPN)	Pan Hung-ming (TPE)	Yuan Tao (CHN)
2018 Jakarta–Palembang	Quan Xin (CHN)	Kazuya Adachi (JPN)	Hermann Husslein (THA)
2022 Hangzhou	Quan Xin (CHN)	Yuuki Tanaka (JPN)	Wu Shao-hsuan (TPE)
2026 Aichi–Nagoya	Hu Zhaoshan (CHN)	Yuuki Tanaka (JPN)	Alexandr Korobov (KAZ)

==== Kayak cross ====
Games	Gold	Silver	Bronze
2026 Aichi–Nagoya	Yuuki Tanaka (JPN)	Quan Xin (CHN)	Hu Zhaoshan (CHN)

=== Women ===
==== C-1 ====
Games	Gold	Silver	Bronze
2014 Incheon	Cen Nanqin (CHN)	Chen Wei-han (TPE)	Sonia Gomari (IRI)
2018 Jakarta–Palembang	Chen Shi (CHN)	Chen Wei-han (TPE)	Atcharaporn Duanglawa (THA)
2022 Hangzhou	Huang Juan (CHN)	Anastassiya Ananyeva (KAZ)	Haruka Okazaki (JPN)
2026 Aichi–Nagoya	Huang Juan (CHN)	Atcharaporn Duanglawa (THA)	Anastassiya Ananyeva (KAZ)

==== K-1 ====
Games	Gold	Silver	Bronze
2010 Guangzhou	Zou Yingying (CHN)	Li Jingjing (CHN)	Asahi Yamada (JPN)
2014 Incheon	Li Tong (CHN)	Chang Chu-han (TPE)	Aki Yazawa (JPN)
2018 Jakarta–Palembang	Aki Yazawa (JPN)	Li Tong (CHN)	Chang Chu-han (TPE)
2022 Hangzhou	Chang Chu-han (TPE)	Li Lu (CHN)	Yekaterina Tarantseva (KAZ)
2026 Aichi–Nagoya	Kurumi Ito (JPN)	Chen Lin (CHN)	Yekaterina Tarantseva (KAZ)

==== Kayak cross ====
Games	Gold	Silver	Bronze
2026 Aichi–Nagoya	Chen Lin (CHN)	Chang Chu-han (TPE)	Xu Linxi (CHN)

== Sprint ==
=== Men ===
==== C-1 200 m ====
Games	Gold	Silver	Bronze
2010 Guangzhou	Li Qiang (CHN)	Alexandr Dyadchuk (KAZ)	Naoya Sakamoto (JPN)
2014 Incheon	Li Qiang (CHN)	Naoya Sakamoto (JPN)	Adel Mojallali (IRI)

==== C-1 500 m ====
Games	Gold	Silver	Bronze
1990 Beijing	Liang Zhisheng (CHN)	Kiyoto Inoue (JPN)	Park Chang-kyu (KOR)
1994 Hiroshima	Konstantin Negodyayev (KAZ)	Park Chang-kyu (KOR)	Yevgeny Astanin (UZB)
1998 Bangkok	Kaisar Nurmaganbetov (KAZ)	Dmitriy Kovalenko (UZB)	Lee Seung-woo (KOR)
2002 Busan	Meng Guanliang (CHN)	Park Chang-kyu (KOR)	Kaisar Nurmaganbetov (KAZ)
2006 Doha	Yang Wenjun (CHN)	Zhomart Satubaldin (KAZ)	Vadim Menkov (UZB)
2026 Aichi–Nagoya	Ji Bowen (CHN)	Vladlen Denisov (UZB)	Lai Kuan-chieh (TPE)

==== C-1 1000 m ====
Games	Gold	Silver	Bronze
1990 Beijing	Guo Daen (CHN)	Katsuya Toyama (JPN)	O Yong-ryong (PRK)
1994 Hiroshima	Yevgeny Astanin (UZB)	Park Chang-kyu (KOR)	Kazuaki Takara (JPN)
1998 Bangkok	Meng Guanliang (CHN)	Kaisar Nurmaganbetov (KAZ)	Lee Seung-woo (KOR)
2002 Busan	Meng Guanliang (CHN)	Kaisar Nurmaganbetov (KAZ)	Dmitriy Kovalenko (UZB)
2006 Doha	Vadim Menkov (UZB)	Yevgeniy Bezhnar (KAZ)	Taito Ambo (JPN)
2010 Guangzhou	Vadim Menkov (UZB)	Shahoo Nasseri (IRI)	Xie Weiyong (CHN)
2014 Incheon	Vadim Menkov (UZB)	Sergey Yemelyanov (KAZ)	Wang Longkui (CHN)
2018 Jakarta–Palembang	Vadim Menkov (UZB)	Shahriyor Daminov (TJK)	Mohammad Nabi Rezaei (IRI)
2022 Hangzhou	Lai Kuan-chieh (TPE)	Vladlen Denisov (UZB)	Timofey Yemelyanov (KAZ)

==== C-2 200 m ====
Games	Gold	Silver	Bronze
2018 Jakarta–Palembang	China (CHN); Xing Song; Li Qiang	Uzbekistan (UZB); Artur Guliev; Elyorjon Mamadaliev	Kazakhstan (KAZ); Merey Medetov; Timur Khaidarov

==== C-2 500 m ====
Games	Gold	Silver	Bronze
1990 Beijing	China (CHN); Jiang Wenbiao; Wang Boqing	North Korea (PRK); Ri Jong-nam; Chu Myong-sop	Japan (JPN); Shusei Fukuzato; Hiroyuki Izumi
1994 Hiroshima	Kazakhstan (KAZ); Konstantin Negodyayev; Sergey Sergeyev	Uzbekistan (UZB); Andrey Gorelov; Vitaly Sorokin	South Korea (KOR); Lee Chong-min; Lee Seung-woo
1998 Bangkok	Kazakhstan (KAZ); Konstantin Negodyayev; Sergey Sergeyev	South Korea (KOR); Jun Kwang-rak; Park Chang-kyu	China (CHN); Meng Guanliang; Sun Maosheng
2002 Busan	China (CHN); Wang Bing; Yang Wenjun	Kazakhstan (KAZ); Alexandr Buglakov; Alexey Cherchenko	South Korea (KOR); Jun Kwang-rak; Park Chang-kyu
2006 Doha	Kazakhstan (KAZ); Alexandr Dyadchuk; Kaisar Nurmaganbetov	China (CHN); Wang Bing; Yang Wenjun	Uzbekistan (UZB); Rustam Mirzadiyarov; Maksim Kiryanov
2022 Hangzhou	Kazakhstan (KAZ); Sergey Yemelyanov; Timur Khaidarov	Japan (JPN); Masato Hashimoto; Ryo Naganuma	Iran (IRI); Adel Mojallali; Kia Eskandani
2026 Aichi–Nagoya	China (CHN); Wu Shengyue; Ji Bowen	Uzbekistan (UZB); Artur Guliev; Vladlen Denisov	Kazakhstan (KAZ); Sergey Yemelyanov; Timofey Yemelyanov

==== C-2 1000 m ====
Games	Gold	Silver	Bronze
1990 Beijing	China (CHN); Kuang Rizhong; Wang Xinqiang	Japan (JPN); Tsunehisa Uchino; Kazuaki Nishikawa	North Korea (PRK); Ri Jong-nam; Chu Myong-sop
1994 Hiroshima	Kazakhstan (KAZ); Konstantin Negodyayev; Sergey Sergeyev	Uzbekistan (UZB); Andrey Gorelov; Vitaly Sorokin	India (IND); Johnny Rommel; Siji Kumar Sadanandan
1998 Bangkok	Kazakhstan (KAZ); Konstantin Negodyayev; Sergey Sergeyev	China (CHN); Qiu Suoren; Sun Maosheng	Japan (JPN); Fumiaki Okawa; Masanobu Ozono
2002 Busan	China (CHN); Wang Bing; Yang Wenjun	Japan (JPN); Taito Ambo; Masanobu Ozono	South Korea (KOR); Lee Byung-tak; Lee Seung-woo
2006 Doha	China (CHN); Ma Xiaojie; Huang Shaokun	Uzbekistan (UZB); Gerasim Kochnev; Serik Mirbekov	Japan (JPN); Taito Ambo; Kosuke Fujii
2010 Guangzhou	Uzbekistan (UZB); Serik Mirbekov; Gerasim Kochnev	China (CHN); Huang Maoxing; Xie Weiyong	Kazakhstan (KAZ); Mikhail Yemelyanov; Timofey Yemelyanov
2014 Incheon	Kazakhstan (KAZ); Mikhail Yemelyanov; Timofey Yemelyanov	China (CHN); Zheng Pengfei; Wang Riwei	Uzbekistan (UZB); Serik Mirbekov; Gerasim Kochnev
2018 Jakarta–Palembang	China (CHN); Liu Hao; Wang Hao	Kazakhstan (KAZ); Sergey Yemelyanov; Timofey Yemelyanov	Uzbekistan (UZB); Nurislom Tukhtasin Ugli; Serik Mirbekov
2022 Hangzhou	Uzbekistan (UZB); Shokhmurod Kholmurodov; Nurislom Tukhtasin Ugli	Kazakhstan (KAZ); Timofey Yemelyanov; Sergey Yemelyanov	India (IND); Arjun Singh; Sunil Singh Salam

==== K-1 200 m ====
Games	Gold	Silver	Bronze
2010 Guangzhou	Momotaro Matsushita (JPN)	Zhou Peng (CHN)	Aleksey Mochalov (UZB)
2014 Incheon	Cho Gwang-hee (KOR)	Ernest Irnazarov (UZB)	Seiji Komatsu (JPN)
2018 Jakarta–Palembang	Cho Gwang-hee (KOR)	Sergii Tokarnytskyi (KAZ)	Mervyn Toh (SGP)

==== K-1 500 m ====
Games	Gold	Silver	Bronze
1990 Beijing	Ma Fuliang (CHN)	Lee Yong-chul (KOR)	Ri Ho-yong (PRK)
1994 Hiroshima	Ivan Kireyev (UZB)	Xu Jiguang (CHN)	Yevgeniy Yegorov (KAZ)
1998 Bangkok	Yevgeniy Yegorov (KAZ)	Anton Ryakhov (UZB)	Kenta Tsutsui (JPN)
2002 Busan	Anton Ryakhov (UZB)	Jung Kwang-soo (KOR)	Qu Xianwu (CHN)
2006 Doha	Liu Haitao (CHN)	Sergey Borzov (UZB)	Alexandr Yemelyanov (KAZ)
2026 Aichi–Nagoya	Shakhriyor Makhkamov (UZB)	Jang Sang-won (KOR)	Dmitriy Kholmogorov (KAZ)

==== K-1 1000 m ====
Games	Gold	Silver	Bronze
1990 Beijing	Chun In-shik (KOR)	Anisi (INA)	Ma Fuliang (CHN)
1994 Hiroshima	Ivan Kireyev (UZB)	Xu Jiguang (CHN)	Yevgeniy Yegorov (KAZ)
1998 Bangkok	Sergey Sergin (KAZ)	Jiang Yuguo (CHN)	Andrey Shilin (UZB)
2002 Busan	Liu Haitao (CHN)	Nam Sung-ho (KOR)	Anton Ryakhov (UZB)
2006 Doha	Liu Haitao (CHN)	Aleksey Babadjanov (UZB)	Moon Chul-wook (KOR)
2010 Guangzhou	Ahmad Reza Talebian (IRI)	Pan Yao (CHN)	Yasuhiro Suzuki (JPN)
2010 Guangzhou	Ahmad Reza Talebian (IRI)	Pan Yao (CHN)	Aleksandr Parol (KGZ)
2014 Incheon	Aleksey Mochalov (UZB)	Ahmad Reza Talebian (IRI)	Yuriy Berezintsev (KAZ)
2022 Hangzhou	Zhang Dong (CHN)	Shakhriyor Makhkamov (UZB)	Kirill Tubayev (KAZ)

==== K-2 200 m ====
Games	Gold	Silver	Bronze
2010 Guangzhou	Japan (JPN); Momotaro Matsushita; Keiji Mizumoto	Uzbekistan (UZB); Sergey Borzov; Aleksey Babadjanov	China (CHN); Hu Yonglin; Wang Lei
2014 Incheon	Japan (JPN); Momotaro Matsushita; Hiroki Fujishima	Kazakhstan (KAZ); Yevgeniy Alexeyev; Alexey Dergunov	China (CHN); Zong Meng; Chu Youyong

==== K-2 500 m ====
Games	Gold	Silver	Bronze
1990 Beijing	South Korea (KOR); Chun In-shik; Park Cha-keun	Japan (JPN); Koya Sato; Fumihiro Kimura	China (CHN); Xue Bing; Feng Xiaofeng
1994 Hiroshima	China (CHN); Chen Guiqi; Jiang Yuguo	Uzbekistan (UZB); Vladimir Kazantsev; Andrey Kolganov	Kazakhstan (KAZ); Dmitriy Izaak; Sergey Skrypnik
1998 Bangkok	Kazakhstan (KAZ); Dmitriy Torlopov; Dmitriy Kaltenberger	China (CHN); Fang Lei; Wang Guizhong	Uzbekistan (UZB); Vladimir Kazantsev; Andrey Shilin
2002 Busan	Kazakhstan (KAZ); Dmitriy Kaltenberger; Dmitriy Torlopov	South Korea (KOR); Jung Kwang-soo; Nam Sung-ho	Uzbekistan (UZB); Aleksey Babadjanov; Mikhail Tarasov
2006 Doha	Kazakhstan (KAZ); Dmitriy Torlopov; Dmitriy Kaltenberger	Uzbekistan (UZB); Sergey Borzov; Aleksey Babadjanov	China (CHN); Li Zhen; Zhou Peng
2022 Hangzhou	China (CHN); Bu Tingkai; Wang Congkang	South Korea (KOR); Cho Gwang-hee; Jang Sang-won	Iran (IRI); Sepehr Saatchi; Peyman Ghavidel
2026 Aichi–Nagoya	South Korea (KOR); Cho Gwang-hee; Kim Hyo-bin	Japan (JPN); Masaya Tanaka; Taishi Tanada	Iran (IRI); Ali Aghamirzaei; Peyman Ghavidel

==== K-2 1000 m ====
Games	Gold	Silver	Bronze
1990 Beijing	South Korea (KOR); Chun In-shik; Park Cha-keun	China (CHN); Liu Xingchao; Lin Yuehua	Indonesia (INA); Abdul Razak; Anisi
1994 Hiroshima	Kazakhstan (KAZ); Dmitriy Izaak; Sergey Skrypnik	Uzbekistan (UZB); Vladimir Kazantsev; Andrey Kolganov	South Korea (KOR); Nam Sung-ho; Kim Soo-yul
1998 Bangkok	Kazakhstan (KAZ); Yevgeniy Yegorov; Sergey Skrypnik	Uzbekistan (UZB); Anton Ryakhov; Gerart Shapar	China (CHN); Fang Lei; Wang Guizhong
2002 Busan	Kazakhstan (KAZ); Dmitriy Kaltenberger; Dmitriy Torlopov	South Korea (KOR); Jung Kwang-soo; Nam Sung-ho	China (CHN); Liu Mingguang; Yin Yijun
2006 Doha	China (CHN); Li Zhen; Lin Miao	Iran (IRI); Abbas Sayyadi; Reza Raeisi	Kazakhstan (KAZ); Yevgeniy Alexeyev; Alexey Podoinikov
2010 Guangzhou	China (CHN); Huang Zhipeng; Xu Haitao	Kazakhstan (KAZ); Alexandr Yemelyanov; Alexey Dergunov	Japan (JPN); Keiji Mizumoto; Hiroki Watanabe
2014 Incheon	Kazakhstan (KAZ); Yevgeniy Alexeyev; Alexey Dergunov	Iran (IRI); Ali Aghamirzaei; Saeid Fazloula	China (CHN); Li Zhenyu; Sun Xinchang
2018 Jakarta–Palembang	China (CHN); Zhang Dong; Bu Tingkai	Kazakhstan (KAZ); Ilya Golendov; Andrey Yerguchyov	Uzbekistan (UZB); Shakhriyor Makhkamov; Shokhrukhbek Azamov

==== K-4 500 m ====
Games	Gold	Silver	Bronze
1990 Beijing	China (CHN); Liu Xingchao; Lin Yuehua; Hu Bin; Tang Xin	Japan (JPN); Naoya Matsushiro; Koya Sato; Nobuyuki Saito; Fumihiro Kimura	South Korea (KOR); Kim Dong-soo; Park Ki-jung; Jung Jong-hwan; Kim Byung-chun
1994 Hiroshima	China (CHN); Huang Zhendong; Wang Xianjun; Wang Yong; Yang Jun	Uzbekistan (UZB); Vladimir Kazantsev; Ivan Kireyev; Andrey Kolganov; Anatoly Tyurin	South Korea (KOR); Jung Kwang-soo; Lee Seung-min; Shim Byung-sup; Kang Ki-jin
2002 Busan	Kazakhstan (KAZ); Yevgeniy Alexeyev; Nikolay Bogachkin; Sergey Sergin; Yevgeniy Yegorov	China (CHN); Lin Yongjing; Liu Haitao; Qu Xianwu; Song Zhongbo	Uzbekistan (UZB); Sergey Borzov; Anton Ryakhov; Dmitry Strykov; Danila Turchin
2018 Jakarta–Palembang	Kazakhstan (KAZ); Ilya Golendov; Alexey Dergunov; Sergii Tokarnytskyi; Yevgeniy Alexeyev	South Korea (KOR); Cho Gwang-hee; Cho Jeong-hyun; Choi Min-kyu; Kim Ji-won	Iran (IRI); Ahmad Reza Talebian; Peyman Ghavidel; Ali Aghamirzaei; Amin Boudaghi
2022 Hangzhou	China (CHN); Bu Tingkai; Wang Congkang; Zhang Dong; Dong Yi	South Korea (KOR); Cho Gwang-hee; Jo Hyun-hee; Jang Sang-won; Jeong Ju-hwan	Japan (JPN); Keiji Mizumoto; Akihiro Inoue; Taishi Tanada; Seiji Komatsu
2026 Aichi–Nagoya	South Korea (KOR); Cho Gwang-hee; Kim Hyo-bin; Jang Sang-won; Choi Min-kyu	China (CHN); Liang Fengwei; Ding Shengkai; Chen Weiyang; Wang Jinwei	Japan (JPN); Masaya Tanaka; Akihiro Inoue; Ryuji Matsushiro; Yuito Sakai

==== K-4 1000 m ====
Games	Gold	Silver	Bronze
1990 Beijing	China (CHN); Xue Bing; Li Yanxin; Feng Xiaofeng; Huang Weiguo	South Korea (KOR); Kim Dong-soo; Park Ki-jung; Jung Jong-hwan; Kim Byung-chun	North Korea (PRK); Kang In-sun; Ri Song-chol; Ryong Sang-hyok; Ri Chang-sop
1994 Hiroshima	Uzbekistan (UZB); Vladimir Kazantsev; Ivan Kireyev; Andrey Kolganov; Anatoly Tyurin	China (CHN); Huang Zhendong; Wang Xianjun; Wang Yong; Yang Jun	South Korea (KOR); Jung Kwang-soo; Lee Seung-min; Shim Byung-sup; Kang Ki-jin
1998 Bangkok	Uzbekistan (UZB); Rafayel Islamov; Andrey Shilin; Vladimir Kazantsev; Konstantin Yashin	Indonesia (INA); Absir; Laode Hadi; Lampada; Sayadin	China (CHN); Jiang Yuguo; Wang Fei; Wang Hai; Zheng Yi
2002 Busan	China (CHN); Lin Yongjing; Liu Haitao; Song Zhongbo; Wan Wenjie	Kazakhstan (KAZ); Yevgeniy Alexeyev; Nikolay Bogachkin; Sergey Sergin; Yevgeniy Yegorov	Japan (JPN); Masaru Dobashi; Junji Matsuda; Naoki Onoto; Masashi Saiki
2010 Guangzhou	Uzbekistan (UZB); Sergey Borzov; Aleksey Babadjanov; Aleksey Mochalov; Vyacheslav Gorn	Kazakhstan (KAZ); Alexandr Yemelyanov; Yevgeniy Alexeyev; Dmitriy Torlopov; Yevgeniy Yegorov	Iran (IRI); Hossein Sinkaei; Ahmad Reza Talebian; Farzin Asadi; Amin Boudaghi
2014 Incheon	Kazakhstan (KAZ); Ilya Golendov; Daulet Sultanbekov; Andrey Yerguchyov; Alexandr Yemelyanov	China (CHN); Zhuang Shuibin; Li Guiqiang; Wu Xiaojun; Zhao Rong	Uzbekistan (UZB); Sergey Borzov; Vyacheslav Gorn; Aleksey Mochalov; Aleksandr Tropin

=== Women ===
==== C-1 200 m ====
Games	Gold	Silver	Bronze
2018 Jakarta–Palembang	Sun Mengya (CHN)	Riska Andriyani (INA)	Dilnoza Rakhmatova (UZB)
2022 Hangzhou	Lin Wenjun (CHN)	Orasa Thiangkathok (THA)	Mariya Brovkova (KAZ)
2026 Aichi–Nagoya	Shohsanam Sherzodova (UZB)	Shuai Changwen (CHN)	Herlin Aprilin Lali (INA)

==== C-2 200 m ====
Games	Gold	Silver	Bronze
2022 Hangzhou	China (CHN); Shuai Changwen; Lin Wenjun	Kazakhstan (KAZ); Margarita Torlopova; Ulyana Kisseleva	Uzbekistan (UZB); Shokhsanam Sherzodova; Nilufar Zokirova

==== C-2 500 m ====
Games	Gold	Silver	Bronze
2018 Jakarta–Palembang	China (CHN); Ma Yanan; Sun Mengya	Uzbekistan (UZB); Dilnoza Rakhmatova; Nilufar Zokirova	Indonesia (INA); Riska Andriyani; Nurmeni
2022 Hangzhou	China (CHN); Xu Shixiao; Sun Mengya	Kazakhstan (KAZ); Rufina Iskakova; Mariya Brovkova	Thailand (THA); Orasa Thiangkathok; Aphinya Sroichit
2026 Aichi–Nagoya	China (CHN); Sun Mengya; Ma Yanan	Uzbekistan (UZB); Shohsanam Sherzodova; Nilufar Zokirova	Vietnam (VIE); Diệp Thị Hương; Nguyễn Thị Hương

==== K-1 200 m ====
Games	Gold	Silver	Bronze
2010 Guangzhou	Shinobu Kitamoto (JPN)	Zhou Yu (CHN)	Natalya Sergeyeva (KAZ)
2014 Incheon	Inna Klinova (KAZ)	Zhou Yu (CHN)	Arezoo Hakimi (IRI)
2018 Jakarta–Palembang	Inna Klinova (KAZ)	Li Yue (CHN)	Yuka Ono (JPN)

==== K-1 500 m ====
Games	Gold	Silver	Bronze
1990 Beijing	Xu Zhijuan (CHN)	Paek In-bok (PRK)	Yoon Mi-jung (KOR)
1994 Hiroshima	Dong Ying (CHN)	Irina Lyalina (UZB)	Choi Sun-hyung (KOR)
1998 Bangkok	Tatyana Sergina (KAZ)	Sayuri Maruyama (JPN)	Zhou Yingjie (CHN)
2002 Busan	Zhong Hongyan (CHN)	Yuliya Borzova (UZB)	Natalya Sergeyeva (KAZ)
2006 Doha	Yuliya Borzova (UZB)	Zhong Hongyan (CHN)	Natalya Sergeyeva (KAZ)
2010 Guangzhou	Zhou Yu (CHN)	Natalya Sergeyeva (KAZ)	Shinobu Kitamoto (JPN)
2014 Incheon	Zhou Yu (CHN)	Natalya Sergeyeva (KAZ)	Lee Sun-ja (KOR)
2018 Jakarta–Palembang	Li Yue (CHN)	Hedieh Kazemi (IRI)	Lee Sun-ja (KOR)
2022 Hangzhou	Li Dongyin (CHN)	Stephenie Chen (SGP)	Hedieh Kazemi (IRI)
2026 Aichi–Nagoya	Wang Nan (CHN)	Arina Tanatmisheva (UZB)	Stella Sukhanova (KAZ)

==== K-2 500 m ====
Games	Gold	Silver	Bronze
1990 Beijing	China (CHN); Sun Yuhong; Zhou Ronghua	Japan (JPN); Miyuki Kobayashi; Kumi Arai	North Korea (PRK); Kim Suk-yong; Ri Myong-bok
1994 Hiroshima	China (CHN); Gao Beibei; Zhao Xiaoli	Japan (JPN); Miyuki Kobayashi; Keiko Muto	Uzbekistan (UZB); Irina Juravleva; Inna Isakova
1998 Bangkok	China (CHN); Gao Beibei; Zhong Hongyan	Kazakhstan (KAZ); Natalya Sergeyeva; Tatyana Sergina	Uzbekistan (UZB); Tatiana Levina; Oksana Shpiganevich
2002 Busan	China (CHN); Xu Linbei; Zhong Hongyan	Kazakhstan (KAZ); Natalya Sergeyeva; Ellina Uzhakhova	Uzbekistan (UZB); Antonina Moskaleva; Nadejda Pishulina
2006 Doha	China (CHN); Zhu Minyuan; Yu Lamei	Japan (JPN); Shinobu Kitamoto; Mikiko Takeya	South Korea (KOR); Lee Sun-ja; Lee Ae-yeon
2010 Guangzhou	China (CHN); Wang Feng; Yu Lamei	Japan (JPN); Shinobu Kitamoto; Asumi Omura	Kazakhstan (KAZ); Yelena Podoinikova; Irina Podoinikova
2014 Incheon	Kazakhstan (KAZ); Natalya Sergeyeva; Irina Podoinikova	China (CHN); Ren Wenjun; Ma Qing	Japan (JPN); Asumi Omura; Shiho Kakizaki
2018 Jakarta–Palembang	China (CHN); Li Yue; Zhou Yu	Uzbekistan (UZB); Ekaterina Shubina; Yuliya Borzova	Japan (JPN); Yuka Ono; Hideka Tatara
2022 Hangzhou	China (CHN); Yin Mengdie; Wang Nan	Kazakhstan (KAZ); Olga Shmelyova; Irina Podoinikova	Uzbekistan (UZB); Ekaterina Shubina; Arina Tanatmisheva
2026 Aichi–Nagoya	China (CHN); Yu Shimeng; Yin Mengdie	Kazakhstan (KAZ); Olga Shmelyova; Tatyana Tokarnitskaya	Uzbekistan (UZB); Arina Tanatmisheva; Ekaterina Shubina

==== K-4 500 m ====
Games	Gold	Silver	Bronze
1990 Beijing	China (CHN); Wen Yanfang; Ning Menghua; Dong Ying; Du Hong	North Korea (PRK); Kim Suk-yong; Yang Suk-yong; Ri Myong-bok; Kim Gyong-suk	Japan (JPN); Miyuki Kobayashi; Kumi Arai; Chieko Akagi; Natsumi Mochizuki
1994 Hiroshima	China (CHN); Hu Dongmei; Wang Mei; Xian Bangdi; Zhang Qin	Uzbekistan (UZB); Inna Isakova; Irina Juravleva; Tatiana Levina; Irina Lyalina	Japan (JPN); Chieko Akagi; Sayuri Maruyama; Keiko Muto; Asako Watanabe
1998 Bangkok	China (CHN); Fang Ailing; Gao Beibei; Liu Zhimin; Xian Bangxing	Uzbekistan (UZB); Inna Isakova; Antonina Moskaleva; Irina Lyalina; Oksana Shpiganevich	North Korea (PRK); Jo Jong-hwa; Ri Myong-bok; Pang Myong-sun; Kang Yon-suk
2002 Busan	Uzbekistan (UZB); Yuliya Borzova; Tatiana Levina; Antonina Moskaleva; Nadejda Pishulina	China (CHN); Fan Lina; Gao Yi; He Jing; Zhong Hongyan	Japan (JPN); Miho Adachi; Shinobu Kitamoto; Yumiko Suzuki; Mikiko Takeya
2010 Guangzhou	China (CHN); Wang Feng; Yu Lamei; Ren Wenjun; Wu Yanan	Uzbekistan (UZB); Yuliya Borzova; Viktoria Petrishina; Ekaterina Shubina; Ksenia Prilepskaya	Japan (JPN); Asumi Omura; Yumiko Suzuki; Ayaka Kuno; Shiho Kakizaki
2014 Incheon	China (CHN); Ren Wenjun; Huang Jieyi; Ma Qing; Liu Haiping	South Korea (KOR); Lee Min; Lee Sun-ja; Lee Hye-ran; Kim You-jin	Kazakhstan (KAZ); Yekaterina Kaltenberger; Kristina Absinskaya; Zoya Ananchenko; Irina Podoinikova
2018 Jakarta–Palembang	China (CHN); Ma Qing; Zhou Yu; Yang Jiali; Huang Jieyi	Kazakhstan (KAZ); Inna Klinova; Irina Podoinikova; Zoya Ananchenko; Viktoriya Kopyova	Uzbekistan (UZB); Natalya Kazantseva; Yuliya Borzova; Ekaterina Shubina; Kseniya Kochneva
2022 Hangzhou	China (CHN); Li Dongyin; Yin Mengdie; Wang Nan; Sun Yuewen	South Korea (KOR); Choi Ran; Lee Han-sol; Jo Shin-young; Lee Ha-lin	Uzbekistan (UZB); Shakhrizoda Mavlonova; Arina Tanatmisheva; Ekaterina Shubina; Yuliya Borzova
2026 Aichi–Nagoya	China (CHN); Yu Shimeng; Yin Mengdie; Wang Nan; Shen Siyu	Uzbekistan (UZB); Milana Dushev-Yanich; Ekaterina Shubina; Arina Tanatmisheva; Shakhrizoda Mavlonova	Kazakhstan (KAZ); Olga Shmelyova; Tatyana Tokarnitskaya; Stella Sukhanova; Evelina Kostenko

=== Mixed ===
==== C-2 500 m ====
Games	Gold	Silver	Bronze
2026 Aichi–Nagoya	China (CHN); Wu Shengyue; Ma Yanan	Uzbekistan (UZB); Vladlen Denisov; Nilufar Zokirova	Kazakhstan (KAZ); Sergey Yemelyanov; Rufina Iskakova

==== K-2 500 m ====
Games	Gold	Silver	Bronze
2026 Aichi–Nagoya	China (CHN); Li Chenhao; Zhang Luxi	South Korea (KOR); Choi Min-kyu; Seon Min-ju	Japan (JPN); Rin Fukuda; Akihiro Inoue
