= Canoeing at the 2002 Asian Games =

- Venue: Nakdong River
- Dates: 10–12 October 2002
- Competitors: 107 from 14 nations

Canoeing and Kayaking were held at the 2002 Asian Games in Busan, South Korea from October 10 to October 12. Men's and women's competition were held in Kayak and men's competition in Canoe with all events having taken place at the Nakdong River Rowing and Canoeing Courses. The competition included only flatwater events.

== Schedule ==
| H | Heats | S | Semifinal | F | Final |

| Event↓/Date → | 10th Thu | 11th Fri | | 12th Sat |
|---|---|---|---|---|
| Men's C-1 500 m | | | | F |
| Men's C-1 1000 m | F | | | |
| Men's C-2 500 m | | | | F |
| Men's C-2 1000 m | F | | | |
| Men's K-1 500 m | | | | F |
| Men's K-1 1000 m | F | | | |
| Men's K-2 500 m | | | | F |
| Men's K-2 1000 m | F | | | |
| Men's K-4 500 m | | | | F |
| Men's K-4 1000 m | F | | | |
| Women's K-1 500 m | | H | S | F |
| Women's K-2 500 m | | | | F |
| Women's K-4 500 m | | | | F |

== Medalists ==
=== Men ===
| Event | Gold | Silver | Bronze |
|---|---|---|---|
| C-1 500 m | Meng Guanliang; China | Park Chang-kyu; South Korea | Kaisar Nurmaganbetov; Kazakhstan |
| C-1 1000 m | Meng Guanliang; China | Kaisar Nurmaganbetov; Kazakhstan | Dmitriy Kovalenko; Uzbekistan |
| C-2 500 m | China; Wang Bing; Yang Wenjun | Kazakhstan; Alexandr Buglakov; Alexey Cherchenko | South Korea; Jun Kwang-rak; Park Chang-kyu |
| C-2 1000 m | China; Wang Bing; Yang Wenjun | Japan; Taito Ambo; Masanobu Ozono | South Korea; Lee Byung-tak; Lee Seung-woo |
| K-1 500 m | Anton Ryakhov; Uzbekistan | Jung Kwang-soo; South Korea | Qu Xianwu; China |
| K-1 1000 m | Liu Haitao; China | Nam Sung-ho; South Korea | Anton Ryakhov; Uzbekistan |
| K-2 500 m | Kazakhstan; Dmitriy Kaltenberger; Dmitriy Torlopov | South Korea; Jung Kwang-soo; Nam Sung-ho | Uzbekistan; Aleksey Babadjanov; Mikhail Tarasov |
| K-2 1000 m | Kazakhstan; Dmitriy Kaltenberger; Dmitriy Torlopov | South Korea; Jung Kwang-soo; Nam Sung-ho | China; Liu Mingguang; Yin Yijun |
| K-4 500 m | Kazakhstan; Yevgeniy Alexeyev; Nikolay Bogachkin; Sergey Sergin; Yevgeniy Yegorov | China; Lin Yongjing; Liu Haitao; Qu Xianwu; Song Zhongbo | Uzbekistan; Sergey Borzov; Anton Ryakhov; Dmitry Strykov; Danila Turchin |
| K-4 1000 m | China; Lin Yongjing; Liu Haitao; Song Zhongbo; Wan Wenjie | Kazakhstan; Yevgeniy Alexeyev; Nikolay Bogachkin; Sergey Sergin; Yevgeniy Yegorov | Japan; Masaru Dobashi; Junji Matsuda; Naoki Onoto; Masashi Saiki |

=== Women ===
| Event | Gold | Silver | Bronze |
|---|---|---|---|
| K-1 500 m | Zhong Hongyan; China | Yuliya Borzova; Uzbekistan | Natalya Sergeyeva; Kazakhstan |
| K-2 500 m | China; Xu Linbei; Zhong Hongyan | Kazakhstan; Natalya Sergeyeva; Ellina Uzhakhova | Uzbekistan; Antonina Moskaleva; Nadejda Pishulina |
| K-4 500 m | Uzbekistan; Yuliya Borzova; Tatiana Levina; Antonina Moskaleva; Nadejda Pishulina | China; Fan Lina; Gao Yi; He Jing; Zhong Hongyan | Japan; Miho Adachi; Shinobu Kitamoto; Yumiko Suzuki; Mikiko Takeya |

== Medal table ==
| Rank | Nation | Gold | Silver | Bronze | Total |
|---|---|---|---|---|---|
| 1 | China (CHN) | 8 | 2 | 2 | 12 |
| 2 | Kazakhstan (KAZ) | 3 | 4 | 2 | 9 |
| 3 | Uzbekistan (UZB) | 2 | 1 | 5 | 8 |
| 4 | South Korea (KOR) | 0 | 5 | 2 | 7 |
| 5 | Japan (JPN) | 0 | 1 | 2 | 3 |
| Totals (5 entries) | | 13 | 13 | 13 | 39 |

== Participating nations ==
A total of 107 athletes from 14 nations competed in canoeing at the 2002 Asian Games:

- China (15)
- Chinese Taipei (3)
- Hong Kong (5)
- Indonesia (8)
- Iran (6)
- Japan (12)
- Kazakhstan (14)
- Kyrgyzstan (1)
- Mongolia (3)
- North Korea (6)
- Philippines (2)
- South Korea (16)
- Tajikistan (2)
- Uzbekistan (14)
