= Canoeing at the 2002 Asian Games – Women's K-4 500 metres =

Women's K-4 500 metres at the 2002 Asian Games
- Venue: Nakdong River
- Date: 12 October 2002
- Competitors: 28 from 7 nations

Medalists
| gold medal | Uzbekistan; Yuliya Borzova, Tatiana Levina, Antonina Moskaleva, Nadejda Pishulina |
| silver medal | China; Fan Lina, Gao Yi, He Jing, Zhong Hongyan |
| bronze medal | Japan; Miho Adachi, Shinobu Kitamoto, Yumiko Suzuki, Mikiko Takeya |

The women's K-4 500 metres sprint canoeing competition at the 2002 Asian Games in Busan was held on 12 October at the Nakdong River.

== Schedule ==
All times are Korea Standard Time (UTC+09:00)

| Date | Time | Event |
|---|---|---|
| Saturday, 12 October 2002 | 11:00 | Final |

== Results ==
| Rank | Team | Time |
|---|---|---|
| 1st place, gold medalist(s) | Uzbekistan (UZB); Yuliya Borzova; Tatiana Levina; Antonina Moskaleva; Nadejda Pishulina | 1:36.358 |
| 2nd place, silver medalist(s) | China (CHN); Fan Lina; Gao Yi; He Jing; Zhong Hongyan | 1:37.336 |
| 3rd place, bronze medalist(s) | Japan (JPN); Miho Adachi; Shinobu Kitamoto; Yumiko Suzuki; Mikiko Takeya | 1:38.134 |
| 4 | Kazakhstan (KAZ); Yelena Parfyonova; Natalya Sergeyeva; Tatyana Sergina; Ellina Uzhakhova | 1:38.824 |
| 5 | South Korea (KOR); Hwang Hyeon-a; Lee Ae-yeon; Lee Ha-na; Shim Young-ae | 1:43.942 |
| 6 | Indonesia (INA); Sarce Aronggear; Rasima; Suhartati; Yohana Yoce Yom | 1:44.302 |
| 7 | Iran (IRI); Hengameh Ahadpour; Raheleh Ahadpour; Farahnaz Amirshaghaghi; Sonia Nourizad | 1:51.790 |
