= Canoeing at the 1998 Asian Games =

- Venue: Map Prachan Reservoir
- Dates: 8–11 December 1998
- Competitors: 169 from 18 nations

Canoeing and Kayaking were held at the 1998 Asian Games in Bangkok, Thailand from 8 to 11 December. Men's and women's competition were held in Kayak and men's competition in Canoe with all events having taken place at the Map Prachan Reservoir in Chonburi. The competition included only flatwater events.

== Schedule ==
H	Heats	S	Semifinals	F	Final

Event↓/Date →	8th Tue		9th Wed	10th Thu		11th Fri
Men's C-1 500 m				H	S	F
Men's C-1 1000 m	H	S	F			
Men's C-2 500 m				H	S	F
Men's C-2 1000 m	H	S	F			
Men's K-1 500 m				H	S	F
Men's K-1 1000 m	H	S	F			
Men's K-2 500 m				H	S	F
Men's K-2 1000 m	H	S	F			
Men's K-4 1000 m	H	S	F			
Women's K-1 500 m				H	S	F
Women's K-2 500 m				H	S	F
Women's K-4 500 m				H	S	F

== Medalists ==
=== Men ===
Event	Gold	Silver	Bronze
C-1 500 m	Kaisar Nurmaganbetov; Kazakhstan	Dmitriy Kovalenko; Uzbekistan	Lee Seung-woo; South Korea
C-1 1000 m	Meng Guanliang; China	Kaisar Nurmaganbetov; Kazakhstan	Lee Seung-woo; South Korea
C-2 500 m	Kazakhstan; Konstantin Negodyayev; Sergey Sergeyev	South Korea; Jun Kwang-rak; Park Chang-kyu	China; Meng Guanliang; Sun Maosheng
C-2 1000 m	Kazakhstan; Konstantin Negodyayev; Sergey Sergeyev	China; Qiu Suoren; Sun Maosheng	Japan; Fumiaki Okawa; Masanobu Ozono
K-1 500 m	Yevgeniy Yegorov; Kazakhstan	Anton Ryakhov; Uzbekistan	Kenta Tsutsui; Japan
K-1 1000 m	Sergey Sergin; Kazakhstan	Jiang Yuguo; China	Andrey Shilin; Uzbekistan
K-2 500 m	Kazakhstan; Dmitriy Torlopov; Dmitriy Kaltenberger	China; Fang Lei; Wang Guizhong	Uzbekistan; Vladimir Kazantsev; Andrey Shilin
K-2 1000 m	Kazakhstan; Yevgeniy Yegorov; Sergey Skrypnik	Uzbekistan; Anton Ryakhov; Gerart Shapar	China; Fang Lei; Wang Guizhong
K-4 1000 m	Uzbekistan; Rafayel Islamov; Andrey Shilin; Vladimir Kazantsev; Konstantin Yashin	Indonesia; Absir; Laode Hadi; Lampada; Sayadin	China; Jiang Yuguo; Wang Fei; Wang Hai; Zheng Yi

=== Women ===
Event	Gold	Silver	Bronze
K-1 500 m	Tatyana Sergina; Kazakhstan	Sayuri Maruyama; Japan	Zhou Yingjie; China
K-2 500 m	China; Gao Beibei; Zhong Hongyan	Kazakhstan; Natalya Sergeyeva; Tatyana Sergina	Uzbekistan; Tatiana Levina; Oksana Shpiganevich
K-4 500 m	China; Fang Ailing; Gao Beibei; Liu Zhimin; Xian Bangxing	Uzbekistan; Inna Isakova; Antonina Moskaleva; Irina Lyalina; Oksana Shpiganevich	North Korea; Jo Jong-hwa; Ri Myong-bok; Pang Myong-sun; Kang Yon-suk

== Medal table ==
Rank	Nation	Gold	Silver	Bronze	Total
1	Kazakhstan (KAZ)	8	2	0	10
2	China (CHN)	3	3	4	10
3	Uzbekistan (UZB)	1	4	3	8
4	Japan (JPN)	0	1	2	3
4	South Korea (KOR)	0	1	2	3
6	Indonesia (INA)	0	1	0	1
7	North Korea (PRK)	0	0	1	1
Totals (7 entries)		12	12	12	36

== Participating nations ==
A total of 169 athletes from 18 nations competed in canoeing at the 1998 Asian Games:

- China (16)
- Hong Kong (4)
- India (10)
- Indonesia (4)
- Iran (11)
- Japan (10)
- Kazakhstan (12)
- Kyrgyzstan (5)
- Laos (3)
- Myanmar (13)
- North Korea (13)
- Pakistan (9)
- Philippines (5)
- Singapore (1)
- South Korea (12)
- Tajikistan (6)
- Thailand (22)
- Uzbekistan (13)
