= Canoeing at the Asian Games =

- Governing bodies: PWW (World) / ACC (Asia)
- Events: 18 (men: 8; women: 8; mixed: 2)

Games
- 1951; 1954; 1958; 1962; 1966; 1970; 1974; 1978; 1982; 1986; 1990; 1994; 1998; 2002; 2006; 2010; 2014; 2018; 2022; 2026
- Medalists

Canoeing events have been contested at every Asian Games since 1990 Asian Games in Beijing.

== Editions ==
Games	Year	Host city	Best nation
XI	1990	Beijing, China	China
XII	1994	Hiroshima, Japan	China
XIII	1998	Bangkok, Thailand	Kazakhstan
XIV	2002	Busan, South Korea	China
XV	2006	Doha, Qatar	China
XVI	2010	Guangzhou, China	China
XVII	2014	Incheon, South Korea	China
XVIII	2018	Jakarta–Palembang, Indonesia	China
XIX	2022	Hangzhou, China	China
XX	2026	Aichi–Nagoya, Japan	China

== Events ==
Event	90	94	98	02	06	10	14	18	22	26	Years
Slalom
Men's C-1						X	X	X	X	X	5
Men's C-2						X					1
Men's K-1						X	X	X	X	X	5
Men's kayak cross										X	1
Women's C-1							X	X	X	X	4
Women's K-1						X	X	X	X	X	5
Women's kayak cross										X	1
Sprint
Men's C-1 200 m						X	X				2
Men's C-1 500 m	X	X	X	X	X					X	6
Men's C-1 1000 m	X	X	X	X	X	X	X	X	X		9
Men's C-2 200 m								X			1
Men's C-2 500 m	X	X	X	X	X				X	X	7
Men's C-2 1000 m	X	X	X	X	X	X	X	X	X		9
Men's K-1 200 m						X	X	X			3
Men's K-1 500 m	X	X	X	X	X					X	6
Men's K-1 1000 m	X	X	X	X	X	X	X		X		8
Men's K-2 200 m						X	X				2
Men's K-2 500 m	X	X	X	X	X				X	X	7
Men's K-2 1000 m	X	X	X	X	X	X	X	X			8
Men's K-4 500 m	X	X		X				X	X	X	6
Men's K-4 1000 m	X	X	X	X		X	X				6
Women's C-1 200 m								X	X	X	3
Women's C-2 200 m									X		1
Women's C-2 500 m								X	X	X	3
Women's K-1 200 m						X	X	X			3
Women's K-1 500 m	X	X	X	X	X	X	X	X	X	X	10
Women's K-2 500 m	X	X	X	X	X	X	X	X	X	X	10
Women's K-4 500 m	X	X	X	X		X	X	X	X	X	9
Mixed C-2 500 m										X	1
Mixed K-2 500 m										X	1
Total	13	13	12	13	10	16	16	16	16	18	143

== Medal table ==
Rank	Nation	Gold	Silver	Bronze	Total
1	China (CHN)	68	25	18	111
2	Kazakhstan (KAZ)	25	24	20	69
3	Uzbekistan (UZB)	16	25	23	64
4	Japan (JPN)	8	17	23	48
5	South Korea (KOR)	5	15	16	36
6	Chinese Taipei (TPE)	2	5	2	9
7	Iran (IRI)	1	5	9	15
8	North Korea (PRK)	0	3	6	9
9	Indonesia (INA)	0	3	2	5
10	Thailand (THA)	0	1	3	4
11	Singapore (SGP)	0	1	1	2
12	Tajikistan (TJK)	0	1	0	1
13	India (IND)	0	0	2	2
14	Kyrgyzstan (KGZ)	0	0	1	1
Totals (14 entries)		125	125	126	376

== Participating nations ==
Nation	90	94	98	02	06	10	14	18	22	Years
Afghanistan									1	1
Cambodia								2		1
China	22	X	16	15	11	25	27	22	17	9
Chinese Taipei				3		6	14	10	5	5
Hong Kong	8	4	4	5	2	1	3	3	8	9
India	X	X	10		6	12	18	17	17	8
Indonesia	X	X	4	8	6	6	12	22	7	9
Iran	10		11	6	9	13	18	17	15	8
Iraq					1		2	1	3	4
Japan	X	X	10	12	8	17	19	19	15	9
Kazakhstan		X	12	14	12	17	20	18	24	8
Kyrgyzstan		X	5	1	6	7	9	2	4	8
Laos			3							1
Lebanon						1	1			2
Macau		X			4	7	8	3	4	6
Malaysia								2		1
Mongolia				3	2	6				3
Myanmar			13					4		2
Nepal							1		1	2
North Korea	X		13	6		4	2	3		6
Pakistan		X	9							2
Philippines			5	2	4	2	1	2	2	7
Qatar					2					1
Singapore	X	X	1			6	11	9	8	7
South Korea	X	X	12	16	10	11	22	18	16	9
Sri Lanka								1		1
Tajikistan			6	2	2	4	4	6	7	7
Thailand			22			9	15	23	26	5
Turkmenistan		X								1
Uzbekistan		X	13	14	9	19	21	22	22	8
Vietnam					9	5		2	11	4
Number of nations	9	13	18	14	17	20	20	23	20	
Number of athletes			169	107	103	178	228	228	213	

== See also ==
- Canoe polo at the 2018 Asian Games
