= Shilin =

Shilin may refer to:

== China ==
- Shilin Yi Autonomous County (石林彝族自治县), of Kunming, Yunnan
  - Stone Forest (石林), limestone formations in Shilin County, Yunnan
- Shilinxia, scenic area in Pinggu District, Beijing

== Taiwan ==
- Shilin District (士林區), Taipei
  - Shilin metro station in Shilin District
  - Shilin Night Market in Shilin District
  - Beitou-Shilin Technology Park

== Other ==
- Shilin (given name)
- Shilin (surname)
