= Canoeing at the 2006 Asian Games – Women's K-1 500 metres =

Women's K-1 500 metres at the 2006 Asian Games
- Venue: West Bay Lagoon
- Date: 13–14 December 2006
- Competitors: 11 from 11 nations

Medalists
gold medal	Yuliya Borzova	Uzbekistan
silver medal	Zhong Hongyan	China
bronze medal	Natalya Sergeyeva	Kazakhstan

The women's K-1 500 metres sprint canoeing competition at the 2006 Asian Games in Doha was held on 13 and 14 December at the West Bay Lagoon.

== Schedule ==
All times are Arabia Standard Time (UTC+03:00)

Date	Time	Event
Wednesday, 13 December 2006	09:50	Heats
Wednesday, 13 December 2006	14:20	Semifinal
Thursday, 14 December 2006	14:40	Final

== Results ==
Legend

- DNS — Did not start

=== Heats ===
- Qualification: 1 → Final (QF), 2–4 → Semifinal (QS)

==== Heat 1 ====
Rank	Athlete	Time	Notes
1	Natalya Sergeyeva (KAZ)	2:14.805	QF
2	Zhong Hongyan (CHN)	2:18.337	QS
3	Elaheh Kharazmi (IRI)	2:20.861	QS
4	Yumiko Suzuki (JPN)	2:21.569	QS
5	Nguyễn Thị Loan (VIE)	2:24.697	
—	Bayansangiin Oyuuntungalag (MGL)	DNS	

==== Heat 2 ====
Rank	Athlete	Time	Notes
1	Sarce Aronggear (INA)	2:14.615	QF
2	Elena Rybalova (KGZ)	2:17.935	QS
3	Hwang Hyeon-a (KOR)	2:21.175	QS
4	Yuliya Borzova (UZB)	2:24.535	QS
5	Sin Kuan Mui (MAC)	2:31.327	

=== Semifinal ===
- Qualification: 1–4 → Final (QF)

Rank	Athlete	Time	Notes
1	Zhong Hongyan (CHN)	2:14.596	QF
2	Yuliya Borzova (UZB)	2:14.720	QF
3	Yumiko Suzuki (JPN)	2:14.732	QF
4	Elaheh Kharazmi (IRI)	2:15.332	QF
5	Elena Rybalova (KGZ)	2:15.376	
6	Hwang Hyeon-a (KOR)	2:15.588	

=== Final ===
Rank	Athlete	Time
1st place, gold medalist(s)	Yuliya Borzova (UZB)	1:58.444
2nd place, silver medalist(s)	Zhong Hongyan (CHN)	2:01.608
3rd place, bronze medalist(s)	Natalya Sergeyeva (KAZ)	2:02.824
4	Yumiko Suzuki (JPN)	2:07.180
5	Sarce Aronggear (INA)	2:07.808
6	Elaheh Kharazmi (IRI)	2:12.528
