= Gao Yi =

Gao Yi may refer to:

- Gao Yi (canoeist)
- Gao Yi (volleyball)
- Gao Yi (politician), Vice Minister of Education, and a member of the Sixth and Seventh National Committee of the Chinese People's Political Consultative Conference.
- Koe Yeet, Malaysian actress, also known as Gāo Yì
