= Canoeing at the 1998 Asian Games – Men's K-4 1000 metres =

Men's K-4 1000 metres at the 1998 Asian Games
- Venue: Map Prachan Reservoir
- Date: 8–9 December 1998
- Competitors: 60 from 15 nations

Medalists
gold medal	Uzbekistan; Rafayel Islamov, Andrey Shilin, Vladimir Kazantsev, Konstantin Yashin
silver medal	Indonesia; Absir, Laode Hadi, Lampada, Sayadin
bronze medal	China; Jiang Yuguo, Wang Fei, Wang Hai, Zheng Yi

The men's K-4 1000 metres sprint canoeing competition at the 1998 Asian Games in Thailand was held on 8 and 9 December at Map Prachan Reservoir.

== Schedule ==
All times are Indochina Time (UTC+07:00)

Date	Time	Event
Tuesday, 8 December 1998	08:30	Heats
Tuesday, 8 December 1998	15:00	Semifinals
Wednesday, 9 December 1998	08:30	Final

== Results ==
Legend

- DNS — Did not start
- DSQ — Disqualified

=== Heats ===
- Qualification: 1–4 → Semifinals (QS)

==== Heat 1 ====
Rank	Team	Time	Notes
1	Uzbekistan (UZB); Rafayel Islamov; Andrey Shilin; Vladimir Kazantsev; Konstantin Yashin	3:07.56	QS
2	China (CHN); Jiang Yuguo; Wang Fei; Wang Hai; Zheng Yi	3:08.27	QS
3	Indonesia (INA); Absir; Laode Hadi; Lampada; Sayadin	3:12.41	QS
4	Kyrgyzstan (KGZ); Andrey Mitkovets; Yury Uliachenko; Yaroslav Tkachev; Dmitry Semikin	3:18.91	QS
5	India (IND); Vinod Pavithran; Karma Toppo; Ashish Kumar Srivastava; Pijush Kanti Baroi	3:19.66	

==== Heat 2 ====
Rank	Team	Time	Notes
1	Kazakhstan (KAZ); Yevgeniy Alexeyev; Ilfat Gatyatullin; Dmitriy Kaltenberger; Dmitriy Torlopov	3:10.85	QS
2	Iran (IRI); Hossein Fathalizadeh; Nader Hedayati; Mohsen Milad; Alireza Sohrabian	3:16.12	QS
3	South Korea (KOR); Nam Sung-ho; Kim Kwang-chul; Shim Byung-sup; Min Kyung-soo	3:17.74	QS
4	North Korea (PRK); Han Chol-su; Ryong Sang-hyok; Ri Song-chol; Kang Jong-hyok	3:21.71	QS
5	Thailand (THA); Weerasak Kaewsup; Panya Nakarn; Witchya Kitboonchoo; T. Suriyachaloen	3:33.38	

==== Heat 3 ====
Rank	Team	Time	Notes
1	Myanmar (MYA); Aung Htay; Myint Tayzar Phone; Than Tin; Khin Maung Myint	3:21.42	QS
2	Pakistan (PAK); Israr Ali; Shah Jahan Khan; Ahmed Riaz; Tahir Shahzad	3:24.53	QS
3	Hong Kong (HKG); Chan Chi Fai; Shek Wing Wai; Lo Ho Yin; Chu Wai Ho	3:26.26	QS
4	Philippines (PHI); Tomas Artigas; Nickelson Ting; Jose Regalado; Mark Pata	3:43.45	QS
—	Tajikistan (TJK); Rinat Akhmetshin; Nodirjon Safarov; Nurali Mirov; Dzhamshed Khassanov	DNS	

=== Semifinals ===
- Qualification: 1–3 → Final (QF)

==== Semifinal 1 ====
Rank	Team	Time	Notes
1	Uzbekistan (UZB); Rafayel Islamov; Andrey Shilin; Vladimir Kazantsev; Konstantin Yashin	3:05.01	QF
2	Indonesia (INA); Absir; Laode Hadi; Lampada; Sayadin	3:07.79	QF
3	Iran (IRI); Hossein Fathalizadeh; Nader Hedayati; Mohsen Milad; Alireza Sohrabian	3:11.58	QF
4	Myanmar (MYA); Aung Htay; Myint Tayzar Phone; Than Tin; Khin Maung Myint	3:16.68	
5	North Korea (PRK); Han Chol-su; Ryong Sang-hyok; Ri Song-chol; Kang Jong-hyok	3:18.27	
6	Hong Kong (HKG); Chan Chi Fai; Shek Wing Wai; Lo Ho Yin; Chu Wai Ho	3:26.37	

==== Semifinal 2 ====
Rank	Team	Time	Notes
1	Kazakhstan (KAZ); Yevgeniy Alexeyev; Ilfat Gatyatullin; Dmitriy Kaltenberger; Dmitriy Torlopov	3:02.53	QF
2	China (CHN); Jiang Yuguo; Wang Fei; Wang Hai; Zheng Yi	3:06.63	QF
3	South Korea (KOR); Nam Sung-ho; Kim Kwang-chul; Shim Byung-sup; Min Kyung-soo	3:08.35	QF
4	Kyrgyzstan (KGZ); Andrey Mitkovets; Yury Uliachenko; Yaroslav Tkachev; Dmitry Semikin	3:14.23	
5	Pakistan (PAK); Israr Ali; Shah Jahan Khan; Ahmed Riaz; Tahir Shahzad	3:23.55	
6	Philippines (PHI); Tomas Artigas; Nickelson Ting; Jose Regalado; Mark Pata	3:42.68	

=== Final ===
Rank	Team	Time
1st place, gold medalist(s)	Uzbekistan (UZB); Rafayel Islamov; Andrey Shilin; Vladimir Kazantsev; Konstantin Yashin	3:10.44
2nd place, silver medalist(s)	Indonesia (INA); Absir; Laode Hadi; Lampada; Sayadin	3:14.64
3rd place, bronze medalist(s)	China (CHN); Jiang Yuguo; Wang Fei; Wang Hai; Zheng Yi	3:16.75
4	Iran (IRI); Hossein Fathalizadeh; Nader Hedayati; Mohsen Milad; Alireza Sohrabian	3:26.54
—	Kazakhstan (KAZ); Yevgeniy Alexeyev; Ilfat Gatyatullin; Dmitriy Kaltenberger; Dmitriy Torlopov	DSQ
—	South Korea (KOR); Nam Sung-ho; Kim Kwang-chul; Shim Byung-sup; Min Kyung-soo	DSQ
