= Canoeing at the 2006 Asian Games – Men's K-1 500 metres =

Men's K-1 500 metres at the 2006 Asian Games
- Venue: West Bay Lagoon
- Date: 13–14 December 2006
- Competitors: 16 from 16 nations

Medalists
gold medal	Liu Haitao	China
silver medal	Sergey Borzov	Uzbekistan
bronze medal	Alexandr Yemelyanov	Kazakhstan

The men's K-1 500 metres sprint canoeing competition at the 2006 Asian Games in Doha was held on 13 and 14 December at the West Bay Lagoon.

== Schedule ==
All times are Arabia Standard Time (UTC+03:00)

Date	Time	Event
Wednesday, 13 December 2006	09:00	Heats
Wednesday, 13 December 2006	14:00	Semifinal
Thursday, 14 December 2006	14:00	Final

== Results ==
Legend

- DNS — Did not start

=== Heats ===
- Qualification: 1 → Final (QF), 2–3 → Semifinal (QS)

==== Heat 1 ====
Rank	Athlete	Time	Notes
1	Alexandr Yemelyanov (KAZ)	1:54.795	QF
2	Reza Raeisi (IRI)	2:06.331	QS
3	Kuat (INA)	2:08.343	QS
4	Tse Chor Yin (HKG)	2:13.235	
5	Lou Kuok Hei (MAC)	2:16.415	
—	Enkhtöriin Tüvshintör (MGL)	DNS	

==== Heat 2 ====
Rank	Athlete	Time	Notes
1	Sergey Borzov (UZB)	1:55.921	QF
2	Masashi Saiki (JPN)	2:04.321	QS
3	Marvin Amposta (PHI)	2:06.597	QS
4	Ali Abdul-Latif (IRQ)	2:10.409	
—	Saeed Al-Mosallam (QAT)	DNS	

==== Heat 3 ====
Rank	Athlete	Time	Notes
1	Aleksandr Stepanov (KGZ)	1:58.295	QF
2	Nam Sung-ho (KOR)	1:58.515	QS
3	Liu Haitao (CHN)	1:58.875	QS
4	Trần Hữu Trí (VIE)	2:01.339	
5	N. Digvijay Singh (IND)	2:03.399	

=== Semifinal ===
- Qualification: 1–3 → Final (QF)

Rank	Athlete	Time	Notes
1	Liu Haitao (CHN)	1:53.650	QF
2	Masashi Saiki (JPN)	1:55.934	QF
3	Nam Sung-ho (KOR)	1:56.526	QF
4	Reza Raeisi (IRI)	2:00.050	
5	Marvin Amposta (PHI)	2:01.030	
6	Kuat (INA)	2:07.566	

=== Final ===
Rank	Athlete	Time
1st place, gold medalist(s)	Liu Haitao (CHN)	1:48.571
2nd place, silver medalist(s)	Sergey Borzov (UZB)	1:49.427
3rd place, bronze medalist(s)	Alexandr Yemelyanov (KAZ)	1:49.867
4	Nam Sung-ho (KOR)	1:49.999
5	Masashi Saiki (JPN)	1:54.815
6	Aleksandr Stepanov (KGZ)	1:57.031
