= Canoeing at the 1998 Asian Games – Women's K-4 500 metres =

Women's K-4 500 metres at the 1998 Asian Games
- Venue: Map Prachan Reservoir
- Date: 10–11 December 1998
- Competitors: 28 from 7 nations

Medalists
gold medal	China; Fang Ailing, Gao Beibei, Liu Zhimin, Xian Bangxing
silver medal	Uzbekistan; Inna Isakova, Antonina Moskaleva, Irina Lyalina, Oksana Shpiganevich
bronze medal	North Korea; Jo Jong-hwa, Ri Myong-bok, Pang Myong-sun, Kang Yon-suk

The women's K-4 500 metres sprint canoeing competition at the 1998 Asian Games in Thailand was held on 10 and 11 December at Map Prachan Reservoir.

== Schedule ==
All times are Indochina Time (UTC+07:00)

Date	Time	Event
Thursday, 10 December 1998	08:30	Heats
Thursday, 10 December 1998	15:00	Semifinal
Friday, 11 December 1998	08:30	Final

== Results ==
Legend

- DNF — Did not finish

=== Heats ===
- Qualification: 1–2 → Final (QF), Rest → Semifinal (QS)

==== Heat 1 ====
Rank	Team	Time	Notes
1	Japan (JPN); Sayuri Maruyama; Sanae Kanno; Yumiko Suzuki; Miho Adachi	1:47.49	QF
2	Uzbekistan (UZB); Inna Isakova; Antonina Moskaleva; Irina Lyalina; Oksana Shpiganevich	1:51.91	QF
3	Thailand (THA); A. Sriboonrueng; Rungnapa Duangtab; T. Suriyacharoen; Malika Jankaew	2:01.16	QS
4	Myanmar (MYA); Aye Mi Khine; Khin Mar Oo; Naw Say Lar; Than Than Oo	2:13.25	QS

==== Heat 2 ====
Rank	Team	Time	Notes
1	China (CHN); Fang Ailing; Gao Beibei; Liu Zhimin; Xian Bangxing	1:45.03	QF
2	North Korea (PRK); Jo Jong-hwa; Ri Myong-bok; Pang Myong-sun; Kang Yon-suk	1:53.60	QF
—	Iran (IRI); Farahnaz Amirshaghaghi; Fariba Khaledi; Negin Farjad; Fatemeh Bibak	DNF	

=== Semifinal ===
- Qualification: 1–2 → Final (QF)

Rank	Team	Time	Notes
—	Myanmar (MYA); Aye Mi Khine; Khin Mar Oo; Naw Say Lar; Than Than Oo	—	QF
—	Thailand (THA); A. Sriboonrueng; Rungnapa Duangtab; T. Suriyacharoen; Malika Jankaew	—	QF

=== Final ===
Rank	Team	Time
1st place, gold medalist(s)	China (CHN); Fang Ailing; Gao Beibei; Liu Zhimin; Xian Bangxing	1:39.20
2nd place, silver medalist(s)	Uzbekistan (UZB); Inna Isakova; Antonina Moskaleva; Irina Lyalina; Oksana Shpiganevich	1:40.81
3rd place, bronze medalist(s)	North Korea (PRK); Jo Jong-hwa; Ri Myong-bok; Pang Myong-sun; Kang Yon-suk	1:44.23
4	Japan (JPN); Sayuri Maruyama; Sanae Kanno; Yumiko Suzuki; Miho Adachi	1:45.54
5	Myanmar (MYA); Aye Mi Khine; Khin Mar Oo; Naw Say Lar; Than Than Oo	1:52.36
6	Thailand (THA); A. Sriboonrueng; Rungnapa Duangtab; T. Suriyacharoen; Malika Jankaew	1:57.21
