= Liu Haitao =

Liu Haitao may refer to:

- Liu Haitao (canoeist) (born 1983), Chinese sprint canoeist
- Liu Haitao (pool player) (born 1982), Chinese professional pool player
