= 2005 Asian Canoe Sprint Championships =

Canoeing competition in Putrajaya, Malaysia

- Host city: Putrajaya, Malaysia
- Dates: 17–20 December 2005

The 2005 Asian Canoe Sprint Championships was the 11th Asian Canoe Sprint Championships and took place from December 17–20, 2005 in Putrajaya, Malaysia.

== Medal summary ==
=== Men ===
Event	Gold	Silver	Bronze
C-1 200 m	Alexandr Dyadchuk; Kazakhstan	Meng Guanliang; China	Ryota Kojima; Japan
C-1 500 m	Chen Zhongyun; China	Vadim Menkov; Uzbekistan	Artem Popov; Kazakhstan
C-1 1000 m	Vadim Menkov; Uzbekistan	Yevgeniy Bezhnar; Kazakhstan	Ma Xiaojie; China
C-2 200 m	Kazakhstan; Kaisar Nurmaganbetov; Alexandr Dyadchuk	Indonesia; Asnawir; Roinadi	Uzbekistan; Rustam Mirzadiyarov; Maksim Kiryanov
C-2 500 m	Kazakhstan; Kaisar Nurmaganbetov; Alexandr Dyadchuk	China; Jing Ying; Xia Zhigang	Uzbekistan; Rustam Mirzadiyarov; Maksim Kiryanov
C-2 1000 m	Kazakhstan; Kaisar Nurmaganbetov; Oleg Bezhnar	Uzbekistan; Rustam Mirzadiyarov; Maksim Kiryanov	China; Gong Yongjun; Pan Meibing
C-4 200 m	Kazakhstan; Kaisar Nurmaganbetov; Oleg Bezhnar; Alexandr Dyadchuk; Andrey Rodin	China; Gong Yongjun; Ma Xiaojie; Meng Guanliang; Wang Bing	Iran; Sirvan Ahmadi; Omid Khoshkhoo; Elias Eghlimi; Aziz Seifi
C-4 500 m	China; Ma Xiaojie; Gong Yongjun; Wang Bing; Meng Guanliang	Uzbekistan; Vadim Menkov; Rustam Mirzadiyarov; Maksim Kiryanov; Gerasim Kochnev	Kazakhstan; Kaisar Nurmaganbetov; Oleg Bezhnar; Alexandr Dyadchuk; Andrey Rodin
C-4 1000 m	Uzbekistan; Maksim Kiryanov; Gerasim Kochnev; Rustam Mirzadiyarov; Vadim Menkov	China; Jing Ying; Xia Zhigang; Chen Zhongyun; Wang Bing	Japan; Ryota Kojima; Makoto Iwasaki; Yuichi Yoshizawa; Koji Maruyama
K-1 200 m	Zhou Peng; China	Aleksey Babadjanov; Uzbekistan	Mohsen Milad; Iran
K-1 500 m	Alexandr Yemelyanov; Kazakhstan	Aleksey Babadjanov; Uzbekistan	Nam Sung-ho; South Korea
K-1 1000 m	Alexandr Yemelyanov; Kazakhstan	Babak Samari; Iran	Liu Haitao; China
K-2 200 m	Kazakhstan; Dmitriy Torlopov; Dmitriy Kaltenberger	Japan; Naoki Onoto; Momotaro Matsushita	Uzbekistan; Mikhail Tarasov; Sergey Borzov
K-2 500 m	Kazakhstan; Dmitriy Torlopov; Dmitriy Kaltenberger	China; Li Zhen; Liu Haitao	Iran; Babak Samari; Mohsen Milad
K-2 1000 m	Kazakhstan; Dmitriy Torlopov; Dmitriy Kaltenberger	Japan; Naoki Onoto; Junji Matsuda	South Korea; Nam Sung-ho; Kim Sun-bok
K-4 200 m	Iran; Mohsen Milad; Babak Samari; Reza Raeisi; Abbas Sayyadi	China; Li Zhen; Liu Haitao; Cang Huiting; Zhou Jianqing	Japan; Keigo Kobayashi; Tetsuya Kakuta; Yasuhiro Suzuki; Takahiko Eguchi
K-4 500 m	Uzbekistan; Mikhail Tarasov; Sergey Borzov; Danila Turchin; Aleksey Babadjanov	Iran; Reza Raeisi; Mohammad Ali Moradpour; Yaser Hedayati; Abbas Sayyadi	China; Han Lei; Zhao Xu; Lin Yongjing; Zhou Jianqing
K-4 1000 m	Uzbekistan; Mikhail Tarasov; Sergey Borzov; Danila Turchin; Aleksey Babadjanov	Kazakhstan; Dmitriy Torlopov; Dmitriy Kaltenberger; Yevgeniy Alexeyev; Sergey Sergin	China; Li Zhen; Zhou Peng; Lin Yongjing; Zhou Jianqing

=== Women ===
Event	Gold	Silver	Bronze
K-1 200 m	Yuliya Borzova; Uzbekistan	Zhong Hongyan; China	Yelena Sosnorikova; Kazakhstan
K-1 500 m	Zhong Hongyan; China	Yuliya Borzova; Uzbekistan	Lee Sun-ja; South Korea
K-1 1000 m	Zhong Hongyan; China	Yuliya Borzova; Uzbekistan	Lee Ae-yeon; South Korea
K-2 200 m	Japan; Shinobu Kitamoto; Mikiko Takeya	Kazakhstan; Yelena Parfyonova; Inna Popova	Uzbekistan; Maria Mekheda; Yuliya Borzova
K-2 500 m	China; Xu Yaping; Yang Yali	Japan; Shinobu Kitamoto; Mikiko Takeya	Kazakhstan; Yelena Parfyonova; Inna Popova
K-2 1000 m	China; Xu Yaping; Yang Yali	South Korea; Lee Sun-ja; Lee Ae-yeon	Japan; Shinobu Kitamoto; Mikiko Takeya
K-4 200 m	China; Wang Feng; Yang Jian; Zhang Jinmei; Zhu Minyuan	Uzbekistan; Yuliya Borzova; Maria Mekheda; Ekaterina Shubina; Olga Umaralieva	Japan; Azusa Tsuna; Suzuko Masutani; Saki Hamano; Ayaka Kuno
K-4 500 m	China; Zhu Minyuan; He Jing; Wang Feng; Yang Jian	Uzbekistan; Yuliya Borzova; Olga Umaralieva; Maria Mekheda; Ekaterina Shubina	South Korea; Lee Sun-ja; Ahn Ji-eun; Shim Young-ae; Lee Ae-yeon
K-4 1000 m	China; Wang Feng; He Jing; Wang Xiaoyan; Wang Qun	South Korea; Lee Sun-ja; Ahn Ji-eun; Shim Young-ae; Lee Ae-yeon	Uzbekistan; Yuliya Borzova; Maria Mekheda; Olga Umaralieva; Ekaterina Shubina

== Medal table ==
Rank	Nation	Gold	Silver	Bronze	Total
1	China	10	7	5	22
2	Kazakhstan	10	3	4	17
3	Uzbekistan	5	9	5	19
4	Japan	1	3	5	9
5	Iran	1	2	3	6
6	South Korea	0	2	5	7
7	Indonesia	0	1	0	1
Totals (7 entries)		27	27	27	81
