= Canoeing at the 2002 Asian Games – Men's K-4 500 metres =

Men's K-4 500 metres at the 2002 Asian Games
- Venue: Nakdong River
- Date: 12 October 2002
- Competitors: 32 from 8 nations

Medalists
gold medal	Kazakhstan; Yevgeniy Alexeyev, Nikolay Bogachkin, Sergey Sergin, Yevgeniy Yegorov
silver medal	China; Lin Yongjing, Liu Haitao, Qu Xianwu, Song Zhongbo
bronze medal	Uzbekistan; Sergey Borzov, Anton Ryakhov, Dmitry Strykov, Danila Turchin

The men's K-4 500 metres sprint canoeing competition at the 2002 Asian Games in Busan was held on 12 October at the Nakdong River.

== Schedule ==
All times are Korea Standard Time (UTC+09:00)

Date	Time	Event
Saturday, 12 October 2002	11:20	Final

== Results ==
Rank	Team	Time
1st place, gold medalist(s)	Kazakhstan (KAZ); Yevgeniy Alexeyev; Nikolay Bogachkin; Sergey Sergin; Yevgeniy Yegorov	1:23.903
2nd place, silver medalist(s)	China (CHN); Lin Yongjing; Liu Haitao; Qu Xianwu; Song Zhongbo	1:24.365
3rd place, bronze medalist(s)	Uzbekistan (UZB); Sergey Borzov; Anton Ryakhov; Dmitry Strykov; Danila Turchin	1:26.423
4	Japan (JPN); Masaru Dobashi; Junji Matsuda; Naoki Onoto; Masashi Saiki	1:27.035
5	South Korea (KOR); Jung Kwang-soo; Lee Seung-min; Moon Chul-wook; Nam Sung-ho	1:28.343
6	Indonesia (INA); Laode Hadi; Lampada; Sayadin; John Travolta	1:30.539
7	North Korea (PRK); Jong Song-gwan; Kang Chol-su; Kang Jong-hyok; Ryong Sang-chon	1:34.283
8	Hong Kong (HKG); Pun Ka Chung; Sin Ying Yeung; Tse Chor Yin; Wong Kin Hei	1:37.883
