= Lyalin =

Lyalin (Russian: Лялин) is a Russian male surname, its feminine counterpart is Lyalina. Notable people with the surname include:

- Oleg Lyalin (1937–1995), Soviet KGB agent
- Vadim Lyalin (born 1982), Belarusian Olympic rower
- Irina Lyalina (born 1968), Uzbekistani sprint canoer
