= Menkov =

Menkov (masculine, Russian: Меньков) or Menkova (feminine, Russian: Менькова) is a Russian surname. Notable people with the surname include:

- Aksana Miankova (Oksana Menkova, born 1982), Belarusian hammer thrower
- Aleksandr Menkov (born 1990), Russian long jumper
- Vadim Menkov (born 1987), Uzbekistani sprint canoer
