= Canoeing at the 2002 Asian Games – Women's K-2 500 metres =

Women's K-2 500 metres at the 2002 Asian Games
- Venue: Nakdong River
- Date: 12 October 2002
- Competitors: 14 from 7 nations

Medalists
gold medal	Xu Linbei; Zhong Hongyan	China
silver medal	Natalya Sergeyeva; Ellina Uzhakhova	Kazakhstan
bronze medal	Antonina Moskaleva; Nadejda Pishulina	Uzbekistan

The women's K-2 500 metres sprint canoeing competition at the 2002 Asian Games in Busan was held on 12 October at the Nakdong River.

== Schedule ==
All times are Korea Standard Time (UTC+09:00)

Date	Time	Event
Saturday, 12 October 2002	10:00	Final

== Results ==
Rank	Team	Time
1st place, gold medalist(s)	China (CHN); Xu Linbei; Zhong Hongyan	1:43.052
2nd place, silver medalist(s)	Kazakhstan (KAZ); Natalya Sergeyeva; Ellina Uzhakhova	1:45.302
3rd place, bronze medalist(s)	Uzbekistan (UZB); Antonina Moskaleva; Nadejda Pishulina	1:46.634
4	South Korea (KOR); Lee Ae-yeon; Lee Sun-ja	1:46.988
5	Indonesia (INA); Sarce Aronggear; Suhartati	1:52.760
6	Iran (IRI); Hengameh Ahadpour; Farahnaz Amirshaghaghi	2:02.822
7	Philippines (PHI); Leonora Escollante; April Penalosa	2:08.942
