= Konstantin Yashin =

Uzbekistani canoeist (born 1973)

Personal information
- Born: June 18, 1973 (age 53)
- Height: 190 cm (6 ft 3 in)
- Weight: 84 kg (185 lb)
Medal record
Men's canoe sprint
Representing Uzbekistan
Asian Games
Gold medal – first place	1998 Bangkok	K-4 1000 m

Konstantin Yashin (Константин Яшин, born June 18, 1973) is an Uzbekistani sprint canoer who competed in the mid-1990s. He got eliminated in the semifinals of the K-4 1000 m event at the 1996 Summer Olympics in Atlanta. Konstantin Yashin got 1st place in K-4 1000 m event at the 1998 Asian Games.
