= Vladimir Kazantsev (canoeist) =

Uzbekistani canoeist (born 1972)

Personal information
- Born: January 4, 1972 (age 54)
- Height: 196 cm (6 ft 5 in)
- Weight: 86 kg (190 lb)
Medal record
Men's canoe sprint
Representing Uzbekistan
Asian Games
Gold medal – first place	1994 Hiroshima	K-4 1000 m
Silver medal – second place	1994 Hiroshima	K-2 500 m
Silver medal – second place	1994 Hiroshima	K-2 1000 m
Silver medal – second place	1994 Hiroshima	K-4 500 m
Gold medal – first place	1998 Bangkok	K-4 1000 m
Bronze medal – third place	1998 Bangkok	K-2 500 m

Vladimir Kazantsev (Владимир Казанцев, born January 4, 1972) is an Uzbekistani sprint canoer who competed in the mid-1990s. He was eliminated in the semifinals of the K-4 1000 m event at the 1996 Summer Olympics in Atlanta.
