= Gao Beibei =

Chinese canoeist

Personal information
- Native name: 高蓓蓓
- Nationality: Chinese
- Born: February 8, 1975 (age 51) Weifang, Shandong, China
- Height: 1.80 m (5 ft 11 in)
- Weight: 75 kg (165 lb)

Sport
- Country: China
- Sport: female sprint canoeist
- Retired: yes
Medal record
Women's canoe sprint
Representing China
World Championships
Silver medal – second place	1995 Duisburg	K-4 500 m
Asian Games
Gold medal – first place	1994 Hiroshima	K-2 500 m
Gold medal – first place	1998 Bangkok	K-2 500 m
Gold medal – first place	1998 Bangkok	K-4 500 m

Gao Beibei
- Traditional Chinese: 高蓓蓓
- Simplified Chinese: 高蓓蓓
Transcriptions
Standard Mandarin
- Hanyu Pinyin: Gāo Bèi Bèi

Gao Beibei (Chinese: 高蓓蓓; pinyin: Gāo Bèi Bèi; born February 8, 1975) is a Chinese sprint canoeist who competed in the mid-1990s. She won a silver medal in the K-4 500 m event at the 1995 ICF Canoe Sprint World Championships in Duisburg; She currently serves as a coach in Water Sports Administration Center of Shandong, the executive coach of Chinese Canoeing Team.

Gao also competed at the 1996 Summer Olympics in Atlanta, finishing fourth in the K-4 500 m event, while being eliminated in the semifinals of the K-1 500 m event.

Born in Weifang, Gao is the executive coach of National Women's Canoeing Team, the head coach of Water Sports Centre of Shandong (the former Shandong Water Sports School).
