= Yevgeniy Yegorov =

Kazakhstani canoeist (born 1976)

Personal information
- Born: 14 February 1976 (age 50)
- Height: 180 cm (5 ft 11 in)
- Weight: 83 kg (183 lb)
Medal record
Men's canoe sprint
Representing Kazakhstan
Asian Games
Gold medal – first place	1998 Bangkok	K-1 500 m
Gold medal – first place	1998 Bangkok	K-2 1000 m
Gold medal – first place	2002 Busan	K-4 500 m
Silver medal – second place	2002 Busan	K-4 1000 m
Silver medal – second place	2010 Guangzhou	K-4 1000 m
Bronze medal – third place	1994 Hiroshima	K-1 500 m
Bronze medal – third place	1994 Hiroshima	K-1 1000 m
Asian Championships
Gold medal – first place	2009 Tehran	K-4 1000 m
Silver medal – second place	2009 Tehran	K-2 200 m
Silver medal – second place	2009 Tehran	K-4 500 m
Bronze medal – third place	2011 Tehran	K-1 1000 m

Yevgeny Yegorov (Евгений Егоров, born 14 February 1976) is a Kazakhstani sprint canoeist who competed in the mid-1990s. At the 1996 Summer Olympics, he was eliminated in the repechages of both the K-1 500 m and the K-2 1000 m events.
