= Zhong Hongyan =

Chinese canoeist

Personal information
- Born: November 29, 1978 (age 47) Tongxiang, Jiaxing, Zhejiang, China
- Height: 175 cm (5 ft 9 in)
- Weight: 66 kg (146 lb)
Medal record
Women's canoe sprint
Representing China
World Championships
Silver medal – second place	2002 Seville	K-4 1000 m
Bronze medal – third place	2006 Szeged	K-1 500 m
Asian Championships
Gold medal – first place	2005 Putrajaya	K-1 500 m
Gold medal – first place	2005 Putrajaya	K-1 1000 m
Gold medal – first place	2007 Hwacheon	K-1 200 m
Gold medal – first place	2007 Hwacheon	K-1 500 m
Silver medal – second place	2005 Putrajaya	K-1 200 m
Asian Games
Gold medal – first place	1998 Bangkok	K-2 500 m
Gold medal – first place	2002 Busan	K-1 500 m
Gold medal – first place	2002 Busan	K-2 500 m
Silver medal – second place	2002 Busan	K-4 500
Silver medal – second place	2006 Doha	K-1 500 m

Zhong Hongyan (钟红燕, born November 29, 1978, in Tongxiang, Jiaxing, Zhejiang) is a Chinese sprint canoer who has competed since 1997. She won two medals at the ICF Canoe Sprint World Championships with a silver (K-4 1000 m: 2002) and a bronze (K-1 500 m: 2006).

Zhong also competed in two Summer Olympics, earning her best finish of fourth in the K-2 500 m event at Athens in 2004.
