= Canoeing at the 2002 Asian Games – Women's K-1 500 metres =

Women's K-1 500 metres at the 2002 Asian Games
- Venue: Nakdong River
- Date: 11–12 October 2002
- Competitors: 10 from 10 nations

Medalists
gold medal	Zhong Hongyan	China
silver medal	Yuliya Borzova	Uzbekistan
bronze medal	Natalya Sergeyeva	Kazakhstan

The women's K-1 500 metres sprint canoeing competition at the 2002 Asian Games in Busan was held on 11 and 12 October at the Nakdong River.

== Schedule ==
All times are Korea Standard Time (UTC+09:00)

Date	Time	Event
Friday, 11 October 2002	09:00	Heats
Friday, 11 October 2002	10:05	Semifinal
Saturday, 12 October 2002	09:00	Final

== Results ==
Legend

- DNF — Did not finish

=== Heats ===
- Qualification: 1–3 → Final (QF), Rest → Semifinal (QS)

==== Heat 1 ====
Rank	Athlete	Time	Notes
1	Natalya Sergeyeva (KAZ)	1:55.670	QF
2	Lee Sun-ja (KOR)	1:57.746	QF
3	Elena Rybalova (KGZ)	2:02.246	QF
4	Huang Chia-hui (TPE)	2:10.688	QS
5	Sonia Nourizad (IRI)	2:11.570	QS
6	Sambuugiin Ariungerel (MGL)	2:47.516	QS

==== Heat 2 ====
Rank	Athlete	Time	Notes
1	Zhong Hongyan (CHN)	1:54.246	QF
2	Yuliya Borzova (UZB)	1:56.172	QF
3	Shinobu Kitamoto (JPN)	1:58.470	QF
4	Sarce Aronggear (INA)	2:02.754	QS

=== Semifinal ===
- Qualification: 1–3 → Final (QF)

Rank	Athlete	Time	Notes
1	Sarce Aronggear (INA)	2:04.606	QF
2	Sonia Nourizad (IRI)	2:11.044	QF
3	Huang Chia-hui (TPE)	2:13.720	QF
—	Sambuugiin Ariungerel (MGL)	DNF	

=== Final ===
Rank	Athlete	Time
1st place, gold medalist(s)	Zhong Hongyan (CHN)	1:52.707
2nd place, silver medalist(s)	Yuliya Borzova (UZB)	1:54.027
3rd place, bronze medalist(s)	Natalya Sergeyeva (KAZ)	1:54.285
4	Lee Sun-ja (KOR)	1:55.365
5	Shinobu Kitamoto (JPN)	1:55.545
6	Sarce Aronggear (INA)	1:59.685
7	Elena Rybalova (KGZ)	1:59.703
8	Sonia Nourizad (IRI)	2:11.691
9	Huang Chia-hui (TPE)	2:11.883
