= Tatiana Levina =

Uzbekistani canoeist (born 1965)

Personal information
- Born: September 4, 1965 (age 61) Andijon
Medal record
Women's canoe sprint
Representing Uzbekistan
Asian Games
Silver medal – second place	1994 Hiroshima	K-4 500 m
Bronze medal – third place	1998 Bangkok	K-2 500 m
Gold medal – first place	2002 Busan	K-4 500 m

Tatiana Levina (Татьяна Левина, born September 4, 1965) is an Uzbekistani sprint canoer who competed in the mid-1990s. At the 1996 Summer Olympics in Atlanta, she was eliminated in the repechages of the K-2 500 m event and the semifinals of the K-4 500 m event.
