= Rafayel Islamov =

Uzbekistani canoeist (born 1972)

Personal information
- Born: February 24, 1972 (age 54) Andijon
- Height: 184 cm (6 ft 0 in)
- Weight: 87 kg (192 lb)

Sport
- Country: Uzbekistan
Medal record
Men's canoe sprint
Representing Uzbekistan
Asian Games
Gold medal – first place	1998 Bangkok	K-4 1000 m

Rafayel Islamov (Рафаэль Исламов, born February 24, 1972) is an Uzbekistani sprint canoer who competed in the mid-1990s. He was eliminated in the repechages of the K-2 1000 m event at the 1996 Summer Olympics in Atlanta.
