= Inna Isakova =

Uzbekistani canoeist (born 1967)

Personal information
- Born: 24 August 1967 (age 59)
Medal record
Women's canoe sprint
Representing Uzbekistan
Asian Games
| Silver medal – second place | 1998 Bangkok | K-4 500 m |
| Silver medal – second place | 1994 Hiroshima | K-4 500 m |
| Bronze medal – third place | 1994 Hiroshima | K-2 500 m |

Inna Isakova (Инна Исакова, born 24 August 1967) is an Uzbekistani sprint canoer who competed in the mid-1990s. At the 1996 Summer Olympics in Atlanta, she was eliminated in the repechages of the K-2 500 m event and the semifinals of the K-4 500 m event.
