= Shilin (surname) =

Shilin (Russian: Шилин) is a Russian masculine surname, its feminine counterpart is Shilina. Notable people with the surname include:

- Afanasy Shilin (1924–1982), Soviet artillery officer
- Aleksandr Shilin (born 1976), Kyrgyz swimmer
- Andrey Shilin (born 1974), Uzbekistani sprint canoer
