= Anton Ryakhov =

Russian canoeist (born 1980)

Personal information
- Born: May 29, 1980 (age 46)
- Height: 191 cm (6 ft 3 in)
- Weight: 96 kg (212 lb)
Medal record
Men's canoe sprint
Representing Uzbekistan
World Championships
Silver medal – second place	2001 Poznań	K-1 500 m
Silver medal – second place	2002 Seville	K-1 200 m
Bronze medal – third place	2001 Poznań	K-1 200 m
Bronze medal – third place	2002 Seville	K-1 500 m
Bronze medal – third place	2003 Gainesville	K-1 200 m
Asian Games
Gold medal – first place	2002 Busan	K-1 500 m
Silver medal – second place	1998 Bangkok	K-1 500 m
Silver medal – second place	1998 Bangkok	K-2 1000 m
Bronze medal – third place	2002 Busan	K-1 1000 m
Bronze medal – third place	2002 Busan	K-4 500 m
Representing Russia
World Championships
Silver medal – second place	2006 Szeged	K-1 500 m
Bronze medal – third place	2005 Zagreb	K-1 200 m
Bronze medal – third place	2010 Poznań	K-2 1000 m
Bronze medal – third place	2011 Szeged	K-4 1000 m
European Championships
Silver medal – second place	2006 Račice	K-1 500 m
Silver medal – second place	2013 Montemor-o-Velho	K-2 1000 m
Bronze medal – third place	2008 Milan	K-1 500 m
Bronze medal – third place	2009 Brandenburg	K-1 500 m
European Games
Silver medal – second place	2015 Baku	K-4 1000 m

Anton Ryakhov (Антон Ряхов, born May 29, 1980) is an Uzbek-born Russian sprint canoer who has competed since the early 2000s. He won nine medals at the ICF Canoe Sprint World Championships with three silvers (K-1 200 m: 2002, K-1 500 m: 2001, 2006) and six bronzes (K-1 200 m: 2001, 2003, 2005; K-1 500 m: 2002, K-2 1000 m: 2010, K-4 1000 m: 2011).

Ryakhov also competed in four Summer Olympics, earning his best finish of fifth in the K-1 500 m event at Beijing in 2008. Until the 2004 Summer Olympics, Ryakhov competed for Uzbekistan. Since those games, he has competed for Russia.

In June 2015, he competed in the inaugural European Games, for Russia in canoe sprint, more specifically, Men's K-4 1000m with Alexandr Sergeev, Vasily Pogreban, and Vladislav Blintcov. He earned a silver medal.
