= 2007 Asian Canoe Sprint Championships =

Canoeing competition in Hwacheon, South Korea

- Host city: Hwacheon, South Korea
- Dates: 13–16 September 2007

The 2007 Asian Canoe Sprint Championships was the 12th Asian Canoe Sprint Championships and took place from September 13–16, 2007 in Hwacheon, South Korea.

== Medal summary ==
=== Men ===
Event	Gold	Silver	Bronze
C-1 200 m	Yang Wenjun; China	Lee Seung-woo; South Korea	Zhomart Satubaldin; Kazakhstan
C-1 500 m	Vadim Menkov; Uzbekistan	Li Qiang; China	Kunio Katsuki; Japan
C-1 1000 m	Vadim Menkov; Uzbekistan	Wang Bing; China	Yevgeniy Bezhnar; Kazakhstan
C-2 200 m	Kazakhstan; Kaisar Nurmaganbetov; Alexandr Dyadchuk	China; Ma Xiaojie; Huang Shaokun	Uzbekistan; Gerasim Kochnev; Serik Mirbekov
C-2 500 m	China; Meng Guanliang; Gong Yongjun	Kazakhstan; Kaisar Nurmaganbetov; Alexandr Dyadchuk	Uzbekistan; Gerasim Kochnev; Serik Mirbekov
C-2 1000 m	China; Zhang Zhiwu; Chen Zhongyun	Uzbekistan; Gerasim Kochnev; Serik Mirbekov	Kazakhstan; Ruslan Muratov; Boris Salkov
K-1 200 m	Zhou Peng; China	Yevgeniy Alexeyev; Kazakhstan	Mohsen Milad; Iran
K-1 500 m	Shen Jie; China	Sergey Borzov; Uzbekistan	Yaser Hedayati; Iran
K-1 1000 m	Shen Jie; China	Yaser Hedayati; Iran	Sergey Borzov; Uzbekistan
K-2 200 m	Kazakhstan; Dmitriy Torlopov; Dmitriy Kaltenberger	South Korea; Jo Hyun-goo; Kim Sun-bok	Japan; Momotaro Matsushita; Naoki Onoto
K-2 500 m	Kazakhstan; Dmitriy Torlopov; Dmitriy Kaltenberger	Uzbekistan; Vladimir Osokin; Vyacheslav Gorn	South Korea; Jo Hyun-goo; Kim Sun-bok
K-2 1000 m	Kazakhstan; Alexey Podoinikov; Yevgeniy Alexeyev	Iran; Reza Raeisi; Abbas Sayyadi	China; Zhang Jidian; Wang Wei
K-4 200 m	China; Zhou Peng; Liu Haitao; Lin Miao; Li Zhen	Iran; Mohsen Milad; Reza Raeisi; Abbas Sayyadi; Yaser Hedayati	Uzbekistan; Aleksey Pityakov; Vladimir Osokin; Vyacheslav Gorn; Sergey Borzov
K-4 500 m	China; Zhou Peng; Liu Haitao; Lin Miao; Li Zhen	Kazakhstan; Alexey Podoinikov; Yevgeniy Alexeyev; Yegor Sergeyev; Alexey Dergunov	Uzbekistan; Aleksey Pityakov; Vladimir Osokin; Vyacheslav Gorn; Sergey Borzov
K-4 1000 m	China; Zhou Peng; Liu Haitao; Lin Miao; Li Zhen	Uzbekistan; Aleksey Pityakov; Vladimir Osokin; Vyacheslav Gorn; Sergey Borzov	Kazakhstan; Yegor Sergeyev; Alexey Dergunov; Dmitriy Torlopov; Dmitriy Kaltenberger

=== Women ===
Event	Gold	Silver	Bronze
K-1 200 m	Zhong Hongyan; China	Shinobu Kitamoto; Japan	Natalya Sergeyeva; Kazakhstan
K-1 500 m	Zhong Hongyan; China	Shinobu Kitamoto; Japan	Lee Sun-ja; South Korea
K-1 1000 m	He Jing; China	Yelena Parfyonova; Kazakhstan	Elaheh Kharazmi; Iran
K-2 200 m	China; Zhu Minyuan; Xu Linbei	Japan; Azusa Tsuna; Yumiko Suzuki	Kazakhstan; Natalya Sergeyeva; Inna Popova
K-2 500 m	China; Zhu Minyuan; Xu Linbei	Japan; Azusa Tsuna; Yumiko Suzuki	Kazakhstan; Yelena Podoinikova; Irina Evert
K-2 1000 m	China; Zhu Minyuan; Xu Linbei	South Korea; Lee Sun-ja; Lee Ae-yeon	Iran; Elaheh Kharazmi; Raheleh Mirzaei
K-4 200 m	China; Zhang Hong; Yu Lamei; Yang Yali; Wang Feng	Japan; Ayaka Kuno; Mari Uehara; Azusa Tsuna; Yumiko Suzuki	Indonesia; Royani Rais; Masrifah; Sarce Aronggear; Kanti Santyawati
K-4 500 m	China; Zhang Hong; Yu Lamei; Yang Yali; Wang Feng	Kazakhstan; Natalya Sergeyeva; Yelena Podoinikova; Irina Evert; Inna Popova	Japan; Ayaka Kuno; Mari Uehara; Azusa Tsuna; Yumiko Suzuki
K-4 1000 m	China; Zhang Hong; Yu Lamei; Yang Yali; Wang Feng	Kazakhstan; Natalya Sergeyeva; Yelena Podoinikova; Irina Evert; Inna Popova	Japan; Ayaka Kuno; Mari Uehara; Azusa Tsuna; Yumiko Suzuki

== Medal table ==
Rank	Nation	Gold	Silver	Bronze	Total
1	China	18	3	1	22
2	Kazakhstan	4	6	7	17
3	Uzbekistan	2	4	5	11
4	Japan	0	5	4	9
5	Iran	0	3	4	7
6	South Korea	0	3	2	5
7	Indonesia	0	0	1	1
Totals (7 entries)		24	24	24	72
