= Canoeing at the 2002 Asian Games – Men's K-4 1000 metres =

Men's K-4 1000 metres at the 2002 Asian Games
- Venue: Nakdong River
- Date: 10 October 2002
- Competitors: 28 from 7 nations

Medalists
gold medal	China; Lin Yongjing, Liu Haitao, Song Zhongbo, Wan Wenjie
silver medal	Kazakhstan; Yevgeniy Alexeyev, Nikolay Bogachkin, Sergey Sergin, Yevgeniy Yegorov
bronze medal	Japan; Masaru Dobashi, Junji Matsuda, Naoki Onoto, Masashi Saiki

The men's K-4 1000 metres sprint canoeing competition at the 2002 Asian Games in Busan was held on 10 October at the Nakdong River.

== Schedule ==
All times are Korea Standard Time (UTC+09:00)

Date	Time	Event
Thursday, 10 October 2002	10:20	Final

== Results ==
Rank	Team	Time
1st place, gold medalist(s)	China (CHN); Lin Yongjing; Liu Haitao; Song Zhongbo; Wan Wenjie	3:04.576
2nd place, silver medalist(s)	Kazakhstan (KAZ); Yevgeniy Alexeyev; Nikolay Bogachkin; Sergey Sergin; Yevgeniy Yegorov	3:04.630
3rd place, bronze medalist(s)	Japan (JPN); Masaru Dobashi; Junji Matsuda; Naoki Onoto; Masashi Saiki	3:08.236
4	Uzbekistan (UZB); Aleksey Babadjanov; Sergey Shubin; Dmitry Strykov; Mikhail Tarasov	3:10.486
5	South Korea (KOR); Kim Byung-tae; Kim Kwang-chul; Kim Yong-kyo; Moon Chul-wook	3:12.568
6	Indonesia (INA); Laode Hadi; Lampada; Sayadin; John Travolta	3:17.032
7	Hong Kong (HKG); Pun Ka Chung; Sin Ying Yeung; Tse Chor Yin; Wong Kin Hei	3:35.602
