= Sergey Skrypnik =

Kazakhstani canoeist

Personal information
- Born: February 2, 1973 (age 53)
- Height: 188 cm (6 ft 2 in)
- Weight: 82 kg (181 lb)
Medal record
Men's canoe sprint
Representing Kazakhstan
Asian Games
| Gold medal – first place | 1994 Hiroshima | K-2 1000 m |
| Bronze medal – third place | 1994 Hiroshima | K-2 500 m |
| Gold medal – first place | 1998 Bangkok | K-2 1000 m |

Sergey Skrypnik (Сергей Скрыпник, born February 2, 1973) is a Kazakhstani sprint canoer who competed in the mid-1990s. At the 1996 Summer Olympics in Atlanta, he was eliminated in the repechages of the K-2 1000 m event and the semifinals of the K-4 1000 m event.
