= Canoeing at the 2002 Asian Games – Men's K-1 1000 metres =

Men's K-1 1000 metres at the 2002 Asian Games
- Venue: Nakdong River
- Date: 10 October 2002
- Competitors: 8 from 8 nations

Medalists
gold medal	Liu Haitao	China
silver medal	Nam Sung-ho	South Korea
bronze medal	Anton Ryakhov	Uzbekistan

The men's K-1 1000 metres sprint canoeing competition at the 2002 Asian Games in Busan was held on 10 October at the Nakdong River.

== Schedule ==
All times are Korea Standard Time (UTC+09:00)

Date	Time	Event
Thursday, 10 October 2002	09:00	Final

== Results ==
Rank	Athlete	Time
1st place, gold medalist(s)	Liu Haitao (CHN)	3:37.734
2nd place, silver medalist(s)	Nam Sung-ho (KOR)	3:38.958
3rd place, bronze medalist(s)	Anton Ryakhov (UZB)	3:39.000
4	Alexandr Yemelyanov (KAZ)	3:43.440
5	Babak Samari (IRI)	3:52.752
6	Hakudo Suzuki (JPN)	3:57.264
7	Lo Ho Yin (HKG)	4:28.656
8	Tserennadmidiin Erdenebat (MGL)	5:29.616
