= Dmitriy Torlopov =

Kazakhstani canoeist (born 1977)

Personal information
- Born: 12 August 1977 (age 49) Ongutsik Qazaqstan
- Height: 180 cm (5 ft 11 in)
- Weight: 85 kg (187 lb)
Medal record
Men's canoe sprint
Representing Kazakhstan
Asian Games
Gold medal – first place	1998 Bangkok	K-2 500 m
Gold medal – first place	2002 Busan	K-2 500 m
Gold medal – first place	2002 Busan	K-2 1000 m
Gold medal – first place	2006 Doha	K-2 500 m
Silver medal – second place	2010 Guangzhou	K-4 1000 m
Asian Championships
Gold medal – first place	2005 Putrajaya	K-2 200 m
Gold medal – first place	2005 Putrajaya	K-2 500 m
Gold medal – first place	2005 Putrajaya	K-2 1000 m
Gold medal – first place	2007 Hwacheon	K-2 200 m
Gold medal – first place	2007 Hwacheon	K-2 500 m
Gold medal – first place	2009 Tehran	K-1 200 m
Gold medal – first place	2009 Tehran	K-4 1000 m
Silver medal – second place	2005 Putrajaya	K-4 1000 m
Silver medal – second place	2009 Tehran	K-4 500 m
Silver medal – second place	2011 Tehran	K-2 200 m
Bronze medal – third place	2007 Hwacheon	K-4 1000 m
Bronze medal – third place	2009 Tehran	K-1 1000 m

Dmitry Torlopov (Дмитрий Торлопов, born 12 August 1977) is a Kazakhstani sprint canoeist who has competed since the mid-1990s. At the 1996 Summer Olympics in Atlanta, he was eliminated in the repechages of the K-2 500 m event and the semifinals of the K-4 1000 m events. Twelve years later in Beijing, Torpolov was eliminated in the semifinals of both the K-1 500 m and the K-1 1000 m event.
