= Sayuri Maruyama =

Japanese canoeist (born 1975)

Personal information
- Born: December 22, 1975 (age 50) Hyogo, Japan
- Height: 162 cm (5 ft 4 in)
- Weight: 56 kg (123 lb)
Medal record
Women's canoe sprint
Representing Japan
Asian Games
Silver medal – second place	1998 Bangkok	K-1 500 m
Bronze medal – third place	1994 Hiroshima	K-4 500 m

Sayuri Maruyama (Japanese: さゆり丸山; born December 22, 1975) is a Japanese sprint canoer who competed from the mid-1990s to the early 2000s (decade). At the 1996 Summer Olympics in Atlanta, she was eliminated in the semifinals of both the K-1 500 m and the K-4 500 m events. Four years later in Sydney, Maruyama was eliminated in the heats of the K-1 500 m event.
