= Sergey Sergin =

Kazakhstani canoeist

Personal information
- Born: July 19, 1976 (age 50) Shymkent
- Height: 194 cm (6 ft 4 in)
- Weight: 90 kg (198 lb)
Medal record
Men's canoe sprint
Representing Kazakhstan
Asian Games
Gold medal – first place	1998 Bangkok	K-1 1000 m
Gold medal – first place	2002 Busan	K-4 500 m
Silver medal – second place	2002 Busan	K-4 1000 m

Sergey Sergin (Сергей Сергин, born July 19, 1976) is a Kazakhstani sprint canoer who competed in the early 2000s. At the 2000 Summer Olympics in Sydney, he was eliminated in the heats of the K-1 500 m event and the semifinals of the K-1 1000 m event. He was born in Shymkent.
