= Shilin (given name) =

Shilin is a transliteration of multiple Chinese given names. Notable people with these names include:

- Sun Shilin (born 1988), Chinese football player
- Xu Shilin (born 1998), Chinese tennis player
- Zhu Shilin (1899–1967), Chinese film director
