= Gao Yi (politician) =

Chinese politician (1914–2022)

Gao Yi (December 1914 - April 19, 2022, Chinese: 高沂), formerly known as Gao Bingjin (Chinese: 高秉晋), a native of Yishui, Shandong Province, was a political figure in the People's Republic of China, who served as Vice Minister of Education, and a member of the Sixth and Seventh National Committee of the Chinese People's Political Consultative Conference.

== Biography ==
Gao Bingjin joined the Chinese Communist Party (CCP) in February 1938 and changed his name to Gao Yi. From 1945 to 1950, he served in the Liaoning Provincial Committee of the CCP and the People's Government of the Northeast China as the secretary of Lin Feng, and from October 1957 onwards he worked at Tsinghua University, where he was successively CCP Deputy Committee Secretary, assistant to the president, and vice-president. In September 1969, he was sent down to work in the May 7 Cadre School of the Ministry of Education in Dashigang, Fengyang County, Anhui Province, and in May 1973, he was transferred to Beijing Normal University, where he served as deputy head of the school's leadership team, deputy secretary of the CCP Committee, and acting secretary of the CCP Committee; from the 1977 to the 1985, he served as vice minister of the Ministry of Education and deputy secretary of the Party Committee; from the fall 1985, he served as an adviser to the Ministry of Education. In 2022, Gao Yi died in Beijing at the age of 108 due to an illness.
