= Canoeing at the 1998 Asian Games – Women's K-1 500 metres =

Women's K-1 500 metres at the 1998 Asian Games
- Venue: Map Prachan Reservoir
- Date: 10–11 December 1998
- Competitors: 10 from 10 nations

Medalists
gold medal	Tatyana Sergina	Kazakhstan
silver medal	Sayuri Maruyama	Japan
bronze medal	Zhou Yingjie	China

The women's K-1 500 metres sprint canoeing competition at the 1998 Asian Games in Thailand was held on 10 and 11 December at Map Prachan Reservoir.

== Schedule ==
All times are Indochina Time (UTC+07:00)

Date	Time	Event
Thursday, 10 December 1998	08:30	Heats
Thursday, 10 December 1998	15:00	Semifinal
Friday, 11 December 1998	08:30	Final

== Results ==
Legend

- DSQ — Disqualified

=== Heats ===
- Qualification: 1–2 → Final (QF), Rest → Semifinal (QS)

==== Heat 1 ====
Rank	Athlete	Time	Notes
1	Sayuri Maruyama (JPN)	2:00.14	QF
2	Zhou Yingjie (CHN)	2:01.67	QF
3	Elena Rybalova (KGZ)	2:03.79	QS
4	Kang Yon-suk (PRK)	2:06.10	QS
5	Khin Mar Oo (MYA)	2:09.55	QS

==== Heat 2 ====
Rank	Athlete	Time	Notes
1	Tatyana Sergina (KAZ)	2:01.11	QF
2	Irina Lyalina (UZB)	2:01.36	QF
3	Lee Sun-ja (KOR)	2:04.01	QS
4	P. Trawronsri (THA)	2:06.83	QS
5	Fariba Khaledi (IRI)	2:23.90	QS

=== Semifinal ===
- Qualification: 1–2 → Final (QF)

Rank	Athlete	Time	Notes
1	Elena Rybalova (KGZ)	2:04.29	QF
2	Lee Sun-ja (KOR)	2:05.41	QF
3	Kang Yon-suk (PRK)	2:06.33	
4	Khin Mar Oo (MYA)	2:11.61	
5	P. Trawronsri (THA)	2:13.71	
6	Fariba Khaledi (IRI)	2:29.13	

=== Final ===
Rank	Athlete	Time
1st place, gold medalist(s)	Tatyana Sergina (KAZ)	2:03.67
2nd place, silver medalist(s)	Sayuri Maruyama (JPN)	2:03.80
3rd place, bronze medalist(s)	Zhou Yingjie (CHN)	2:07.64
4	Irina Lyalina (UZB)	2:14.05
5	Elena Rybalova (KGZ)	2:14.23
—	Lee Sun-ja (KOR)	DSQ
