= Canoeing at the 2002 Asian Games – Men's K-2 500 metres =

Men's K-2 500 metres at the 2002 Asian Games
- Venue: Nakdong River
- Date: 12 October 2002
- Competitors: 18 from 9 nations

Medalists
gold medal	Dmitriy Kaltenberger; Dmitriy Torlopov	Kazakhstan
silver medal	Jung Kwang-soo; Nam Sung-ho	South Korea
bronze medal	Aleksey Babadjanov; Mikhail Tarasov	Uzbekistan

The men's K-2 500 metres sprint canoeing competition at the 2002 Asian Games in Busan was held on 12 October 2002 at the Nakdong River.

== Schedule ==
All times are Korea Standard Time (UTC+09:00)

Date	Time	Event
Saturday, 12 October 2002	10:40	Final

== Results ==
Rank	Team	Time
1st place, gold medalist(s)	Kazakhstan (KAZ); Dmitriy Kaltenberger; Dmitriy Torlopov	1:32.600
2nd place, silver medalist(s)	South Korea (KOR); Jung Kwang-soo; Nam Sung-ho	1:33.614
3rd place, bronze medalist(s)	Uzbekistan (UZB); Aleksey Babadjanov; Mikhail Tarasov	1:34.706
4	Iran (IRI); Mohsen Milad; Babak Samari	1:37.352
5	China (CHN); Liu Mingguang; Yin Yijun	1:37.844
6	Indonesia (INA); Laode Hadi; Sayadin	1:39.050
7	Tajikistan (TJK); Rinat Akhmetshin; Nodirjon Safarov	1:44.396
8	Chinese Taipei (TPE); Chen Chien-liang; Huang Chih-liang	1:45.356
9	Hong Kong (HKG); Tse Chor Yin; Wong King Hei	1:48.884
