= Shilinxia =

Shilinxia, known officially as "Shilinxia Scenic Area" is a twelve kilometer gorge located in Diaowo Village in Beijing's Pinggu District, China, 70 kilometers northeast of central Beijing.

== Glass Sightseeing Platform ==
Shilinxia's main attraction is its Glass Sightseeing Platform, which, at a 32.8 meters overhang, is claimed to be the largest glass sightseeing platform in the world. The platform is hung from the gorge's highest peak at 800 meters above sea level and 400 meters above the bottom of the gorge. Construction of the platform, which was built with titanium alloys, was completed on April 31, 2016.

== Mythology ==
Shilinxia serves as the setting for stories in Chinese mythology, including a love story between Xiagu (xiá gū 霞姑) and Sanlang (sān láng 三郎).:

When you come to the Qixia Pool, you will see a sculpture of a pretty young Chinese woman, Xiagu. Legend has it that Xiagu lived here a long time ago and used to wash clothes at the pool. Her husband, Sanlang, was drafted into the army to resist a foreign invasion. One day, a flood dragon came to Shilinxia and imprisoned her because the dragon was drawn to her beauty.

Xiangu didn't surrender and killed herself by banging her head on a giant rock. Upon hearing the grievous news, Sanlang came back and slew the dragon with the help of an arhat, a "perfected person" who has achieved nirvana in Buddhist tradition. The arhat helped Xiagu and Sanlang become immortal and the couple stayed at Shilinxia to protect the local residents from then on.
