= Ilfat Gatyatullin =

Kazakhstani canoeist

Ilfat Gatyatullin (Илфат Ильсурович Гатиятуллин, born August 23, 1977) is a Kazakhstani sprint canoer who competed in the mid-1990s. At the 1996 Summer Olympics in Atlanta, he was eliminated in the repechages of the K-2 500 m event and the semifinals of the K-4 1000 m events.
