= Canoeing at the 2002 Asian Games – Men's K-2 1000 metres =

Men's K-2 1000 metres at the 2002 Asian Games
- Venue: Nakdong River
- Date: 10 October 2002
- Competitors: 16 from 8 nations

Medalists
gold medal	Dmitriy Kaltenberger; Dmitriy Torlopov	Kazakhstan
silver medal	Jung Kwang-soo; Nam Sung-ho	South Korea
bronze medal	Liu Mingguang; Yin Yijun	China

The men's K-2 1000 metres sprint canoeing competition at the 2002 Asian Games in Busan was held on 10 October at the Nakdong River.

== Schedule ==
All times are Korea Standard Time (UTC+09:00)

Date	Time	Event
Thursday, 10 October 2002	09:40	Final

== Results ==
Rank	Team	Time
1st place, gold medalist(s)	Kazakhstan (KAZ); Dmitriy Kaltenberger; Dmitriy Torlopov	3:22.415
2nd place, silver medalist(s)	South Korea (KOR); Jung Kwang-soo; Nam Sung-ho	3:23.357
3rd place, bronze medalist(s)	China (CHN); Liu Mingguang; Yin Yijun	3:23.753
4	Uzbekistan (UZB); Sergey Borzov; Danila Turchin	3:34.625
5	Indonesia (INA); Laode Hadi; Sayadin	3:36.617
6	Tajikistan (TJK); Rinat Akhmetshin; Nodirjon Safarov	3:52.247
7	Chinese Taipei (TPE); Chen Chien-liang; Huang Chih-liang	3:52.799
8	Hong Kong (HKG); Pun Ka Chung; Sin Ying Yeung	4:07.085
