= Canoeing at the 2014 Asian Games – Men's C-1 1000 metres =

Asian Games competitions

Men's C-1 1000 metres at the 2014 Asian Games
- Venue: Misari Regatta
- Date: 27–29 September 2014
- Competitors: 10 from 10 nations

Medalists
| gold medal | Vadim Menkov | Uzbekistan |
| silver medal | Sergey Yemelyanov | Kazakhstan |
| bronze medal | Wang Longkui | China |

The men's C-1 1000 metres sprint canoeing competition at the 2014 Asian Games in Hanam was held from 27 to 29 September at the Misari Canoe/Kayak Center.

== Schedule ==
All times are Korea Standard Time (UTC+09:00)

| Date | Time | Event |
|---|---|---|
| Saturday, 27 September 2014 | 10:20 | Heats |
| Sunday, 28 September 2014 | 10:10 | Semifinal |
| Monday, 29 September 2014 | 11:10 | Final |

== Results ==
=== Heats ===
- Qualification: 1–3 → Final (QF), Rest → Semifinal (QS)

==== Heat 1 ====
| Rank | Athlete | Time | Notes |
|---|---|---|---|
| 1 | Vadim Menkov (UZB) | 4:06.394 | QF |
| 2 | Sergey Yemelyanov (KAZ) | 4:12.655 | QF |
| 3 | Anwar Tarra (INA) | 4:23.372 | QF |
| 4 | Gaurav Tomar (IND) | 4:23.554 | QS |
| 5 | Kim Tae-eun (KOR) | 4:34.483 | QS |

==== Heat 2 ====
| Rank | Athlete | Time | Notes |
|---|---|---|---|
| 1 | Wang Longkui (CHN) | 4:16.284 | QF |
| 2 | Chou En-ping (TPE) | 4:18.622 | QF |
| 3 | Shahoo Nasseri (IRI) | 4:21.609 | QF |
| 4 | Shahriyor Daminov (TJK) | 4:32.134 | QS |
| 5 | Hermie Macaranas (PHI) | 4:34.409 | QS |

=== Semifinal ===
- Qualification: 1–3 → Final (QF)

| Rank | Athlete | Time | Notes |
|---|---|---|---|
| 1 | Gaurav Tomar (IND) | 4:18.953 | QF |
| 2 | Kim Tae-eun (KOR) | 4:20.838 | QF |
| 3 | Shahriyor Daminov (TJK) | 4:22.683 | QF |
| 4 | Hermie Macaranas (PHI) | 4:22.704 | |

=== Final ===
| Rank | Athlete | Time |
|---|---|---|
| 1st place, gold medalist(s) | Vadim Menkov (UZB) | 3:57.403 |
| 2nd place, silver medalist(s) | Sergey Yemelyanov (KAZ) | 4:01.138 |
| 3rd place, bronze medalist(s) | Wang Longkui (CHN) | 4:03.890 |
| 4 | Kim Tae-eun (KOR) | 4:09.332 |
| 5 | Shahoo Nasseri (IRI) | 4:12.857 |
| 6 | Chou En-ping (TPE) | 4:17.183 |
| 7 | Gaurav Tomar (IND) | 4:17.389 |
| 8 | Anwar Tarra (INA) | 4:18.536 |
| 9 | Shahriyor Daminov (TJK) | 4:19.162 |
