= Andrey Shilin =

Uzbekistani canoeist (born 1974)

Personal information
- Born: May 18, 1974 (age 52)
- Height: 192 cm (6 ft 4 in)
- Weight: 80 kg (176 lb)
Medal record
Men's canoe sprint
Representing Uzbekistan
Asian Games
Gold medal – first place	1998 Bangkok	K-4 1000 m
Bronze medal – third place	1998 Bangkok	K-1 1000 m
Bronze medal – third place	1998 Bangkok	K-2 500 m

Andrey Shilin (Андрей Шилин, born May 18, 1974) is an Uzbekistani sprint canoer who competed in the mid-1990s. He was eliminated in the semifinals of the K-4 1000 m event at the 1996 Summer Olympics in Atlanta.
