= Dmitriy Kaltenberger =

Kazakhstani canoeist

Personal information
- Born: 18 April 1976 (age 50)
- Height: 180 cm (5 ft 11 in)
- Weight: 84 kg (185 lb)
Medal record
Men's canoe sprint
Representing Kazakhstan
Asian Games
Gold medal – first place	1998 Bangkok	K-2 500 m
Gold medal – first place	2002 Busan	K-2 500 m
Gold medal – first place	2002 Busan	K-2 1000 m
Gold medal – first place	2006 Doha	K-2 500 m
Asian Championships
Gold medal – first place	2005 Putrajaya	K-2 200 m
Gold medal – first place	2005 Putrajaya	K-2 500 m
Gold medal – first place	2005 Putrajaya	K-2 1000 m
Gold medal – first place	2007 Hwacheon	K-2 200 m
Gold medal – first place	2007 Hwacheon	K-2 500 m
Silver medal – second place	2005 Putrajaya	K-4 1000 m
Bronze medal – third place	2007 Hwacheon	K-4 1000 m

Dmitriy Kaltenberger (also spelled Dmitry, Kazakh: Дми́трий Кальтенбе́ргер; born 18 April 1976) is a Kazakhstani sprint canoeist who competed in the late 2000s. At the 2008 Summer Olympics in Beijing, he was eliminated in the semifinals of the K-2 500 m event.
