= Canoeing at the 1998 Asian Games – Women's K-2 500 metres =

Women's K-2 500 metres at the 1998 Asian Games
- Venue: Map Prachan Reservoir
- Date: 10–11 December 1998
- Competitors: 20 from 10 nations

Medalists
gold medal	Gao Beibei; Zhong Hongyan	China
silver medal	Natalya Sergeyeva; Tatyana Sergina	Kazakhstan
bronze medal	Tatiana Levina; Oksana Shpiganevich	Uzbekistan

The women's K-2 500 metres sprint canoeing competition at the 1998 Asian Games in Thailand was held on 10 and 11 December at Map Prachan Reservoir.

== Schedule ==
All times are Indochina Time (UTC+07:00)

Date	Time	Event
Thursday, 10 December 1998	08:30	Heats
Thursday, 10 December 1998	15:00	Semifinal
Friday, 11 December 1998	08:30	Final

== Results ==
=== Heats ===
- Qualification: 1–2 → Final (QF), Rest → Semifinal (QS)

==== Heat 1 ====
Rank	Team	Time	Notes
1	Japan (JPN); Shinobu Kitamoto; Azusa Tsuna	1:49.36	QF
2	Uzbekistan (UZB); Tatiana Levina; Oksana Shpiganevich	1:49.86	QF
3	Kazakhstan (KAZ); Natalya Sergeyeva; Tatyana Sergina	1:50.42	QS
4	South Korea (KOR); Lee Ae-yeon; Lee Sun-ja	1:56.91	QS
5	Thailand (THA); Wilairat Sanphat; T. Lertpanyasakul	2:04.69	QS

==== Heat 2 ====
Rank	Team	Time	Notes
1	China (CHN); Gao Beibei; Zhong Hongyan	1:46.25	QF
2	North Korea (PRK); Ri Jong-sim; Ri Myong-bok	1:54.08	QF
3	India (IND); K. Minimar; S. Srimati	1:57.69	QS
4	Myanmar (MYA); Than Than Oo; Naw Say Lar	2:05.97	QS
5	Iran (IRI); Farahnaz Amirshaghaghi; Negin Farjad	2:07.96	QS

=== Semifinal ===
- Qualification: 1–2 → Final (QF)

Rank	Team	Time	Notes
1	Kazakhstan (KAZ); Natalya Sergeyeva; Tatyana Sergina	1:53.14	QF
2	India (IND); K. Minimar; S. Srimati	1:56.67	QF
3	South Korea (KOR); Lee Ae-yeon; Lee Sun-ja	1:57.82	
4	Myanmar (MYA); Than Than Oo; Naw Say Lar	2:06.33	
5	Thailand (THA); Wilairat Sanphat; T. Lertpanyasakul	2:06.71	
6	Iran (IRI); Farahnaz Amirshaghaghi; Negin Farjad	2:15.59	

=== Final ===
Rank	Team	Time
1st place, gold medalist(s)	China (CHN); Gao Beibei; Zhong Hongyan	1:54.64
2nd place, silver medalist(s)	Kazakhstan (KAZ); Natalya Sergeyeva; Tatyana Sergina	1:57.28
3rd place, bronze medalist(s)	Uzbekistan (UZB); Tatiana Levina; Oksana Shpiganevich	1:59.42
4	Japan (JPN); Shinobu Kitamoto; Azusa Tsuna	2:00.48
5	North Korea (PRK); Ri Jong-sim; Ri Myong-bok	2:00.84
6	India (IND); K. Minimar; S. Srimati	2:07.24
