= Vadim Menkov =

Uzbekistani sprint canoeist

Personal information
- Born: 12 February 1987 (age 39) Toytepa, Tashkent Region, Uzbekistan
- Height: 184 cm (6 ft 0 in)
- Weight: 87 kg (192 lb)
Medal record
Men's canoe sprint
Representing Uzbekistan
World Championships
Gold medal – first place	2009 Dartmouth	C-1 1000 m
Gold medal – first place	2010 Poznań	C-1 1000 m
Silver medal – second place	2013 Duisburg	C-1 500 m
Bronze medal – third place	2010 Poznań	C-1 500 m
Bronze medal – third place	2011 Szeged	C-1 1000 m
Asian Games
Gold medal – first place	2014 Incheon	C-1 1000 m
Asian Championships
Gold medal – first place	2005 Putrajaya	C-1 1000 m
Gold medal – first place	2005 Putrajaya	C-4 1000 m
Gold medal – first place	2007 Hwacheon	C-1 500 m
Gold medal – first place	2007 Hwacheon	C-1 1000 m
Gold medal – first place	2011 Tehran	C-2 500 m
Gold medal – first place	2013 Samarkand	C-1 500 m
Gold medal – first place	2013 Samarkand	C-1 1000 m
Gold medal – first place	2015 Palembang	C-2 1000 m
Gold medal – first place	2017 Shanghai	C-1 1000 m
Silver medal – second place	2005 Putrajaya	C-1 500 m
Silver medal – second place	2005 Putrajaya	C-4 500 m
Silver medal – second place	2017 Shanghai	C-4 200 m
Silver medal – second place	2017 Shanghai	C-4 500 m
Bronze medal – third place	2011 Tehran	C-2 1000 m
Bronze medal – third place	2017 Shanghai	C-4 1000 m

Vadim Menkov (born 12 February 1987) is an Uzbek male sprint canoeist who has competed since the late 2000s. He has won six medals at the ICF Canoe Sprint World Championships with two golds (C-1 1000 m: 2009, 2010), a silver (C-1 500 m: 2013) and two bronze (C-1 500 m: 2010, C-1 1000 m: 2011). Most recently, Menkov won the gold medal in the sprint( C1-1000m) event in canoeing at the 2010 Asian Games in Guangzhou, China.

Menkov also competed at the 2008 Summer Olympics in Beijing, finishing fourth in the C-1 1000 m event while being eliminated in the semi-finals of the C-1 500m. At the 2012 Summer Olympics he competed in the C-1 200 m, finishing 10th, and the C-1 1000 m, finishing 4th again.

== Biography ==
Menkov was born in Toytepa, Tashkent Region, Uzbekistan. In 2004 he entered to the "Olympic reserver" high-school in Chirchiq. After graduation, he was able to enter the "Uzbek State Institute of Physical Culture" in 2007.

== Career ==
Menkov began his career in 2003 under coach Aleksandr Panomaryov.

In 2006 in Doha, he won his first International tournament. That same year he won the Asian Championship in canoeing, and went on to take the second place in the Canoe World Championship, which was held in Poland.

He competed in the 2008 Summer Olympics in Beijing, where he achieved the 4th place in the C-1 1000 meter event.

In 2009, Menkov won a number of International tournaments which were held in Poland, Czech Republic and Hungary. Due to his results, he was recognized as the 2009 Canoe Athlete of the Year by the International Canoe Federation.

In 2012 he represented Uzbekistan at the 2012 Summer Olympics in London. He finished 4th with a time of 3:49.255.

At the 2014 Asian Games, he won the gold medal in the men's C-1 1000 m event.

Menkov is one of the most recognized sportsmen in Uzbekistan, holding the title of "Honoured Master of Sport in Uzbekistan" since 2014.
