= Canoeing at the 1998 Asian Games – Men's K-2 1000 metres =

Men's K-2 1000 metres at the 1998 Asian Games
- Venue: Map Prachan Reservoir
- Date: 8–9 December 1998
- Competitors: 24 from 12 nations

Medalists
gold medal	Yevgeniy Yegorov; Sergey Skrypnik	Kazakhstan
silver medal	Anton Ryakhov; Gerart Shapar	Uzbekistan
bronze medal	Fang Lei; Wang Guizhong	China

The men's K-2 1000 metres sprint canoeing competition at the 1998 Asian Games in Thailand was held on 8 and 9 December at Map Prachan Reservoir.

== Schedule ==
All times are Indochina Time (UTC+07:00)

Date	Time	Event
Tuesday, 8 December 1998	08:30	Heats
Tuesday, 8 December 1998	15:00	Semifinal
Wednesday, 9 December 1998	08:30	Final

== Results ==
Legend

- DNS — Did not start

=== Heats ===
- Qualification: 1–2 → Final (QF), 3–5 → Semifinal (QS)

==== Heat 1 ====
Rank	Team	Time	Notes
1	Kazakhstan (KAZ); Yevgeniy Yegorov; Sergey Skrypnik	3:37.98	QF
2	Indonesia (INA); Sayadin; Lampada	3:39.55	QF
3	China (CHN); Fang Lei; Wang Guizhong	4:07.23	QS
4	Thailand (THA); N. Thananchai; Buntawee Maisee	4:18.17	QS
—	Kyrgyzstan (KGZ); Dmitry Semikin; Yaroslav Tkachev	DNS	
—	Tajikistan (TJK); Dzhamshed Khassanov; Nodirjon Safarov	DNS	

==== Heat 2 ====
Rank	Team	Time	Notes
1	Uzbekistan (UZB); Anton Ryakhov; Gerart Shapar	3:43.27	QF
2	Iran (IRI); Nader Hedayati; Alireza Mohammadi	3:56.95	QF
3	India (IND); Ashish Kumar Srivastava; Prem Kumar Rai	4:04.59	QS
4	Pakistan (PAK); Ashiq Elahi; Azhar Hussain	4:13.94	QS
5	South Korea (KOR); Lee Dong-Keun; Moon Chul-wook	4:20.22	QS
6	Myanmar (MYA); Myat Khaing; Than Naing Shwe	4:21.76	

=== Semifinal ===
- Qualification: 1–2 → Final (QF)

Rank	Team	Time	Notes
1	China (CHN); Fang Lei; Wang Guizhong	3:26.58	QF
2	South Korea (KOR); Lee Dong-Keun; Moon Chul-wook	3:36.65	QF
3	India (IND); Ashish Kumar Srivastava; Prem Kumar Rai	3:39.92	
4	Pakistan (PAK); Ashiq Elahi; Azhar Hussain	3:46.02	
5	Thailand (THA); N. Thananchai; Buntawee Maisee	3:52.92	

=== Final ===
Rank	Team	Time
1st place, gold medalist(s)	Kazakhstan (KAZ); Yevgeniy Yegorov; Sergey Skrypnik	3:32.36
2nd place, silver medalist(s)	Uzbekistan (UZB); Anton Ryakhov; Gerart Shapar	3:37.56
3rd place, bronze medalist(s)	China (CHN); Fang Lei; Wang Guizhong	3:41.15
4	Indonesia (INA); Sayadin; Lampada	3:45.95
5	Iran (IRI); Nader Hedayati; Alireza Mohammadi	4:04.11
6	South Korea (KOR); Lee Dong-Keun; Moon Chul-wook	4:15.69
