= Canoeing at the 1998 Asian Games – Men's K-1 1000 metres =

Sporting event at the 1998 Asian Games

Men's K-1 1000 metres at the 1998 Asian Games
- Venue: Map Prachan Reservoir
- Date: 8–9 December 1998
- Competitors: 14 from 14 nations

Medalists
gold medal	Sergey Sergin	Kazakhstan
silver medal	Jiang Yuguo	China
bronze medal	Andrey Shilin	Uzbekistan

The men's K-1 1000 metres sprint canoeing competition at the 1998 Asian Games in Thailand was held on 8 and 9 December at Map Prachan Reservoir.

== Schedule ==
All times are Indochina Time (UTC+07:00)

Date	Time	Event
Tuesday, 8 December 1998	08:30	Heats
Tuesday, 8 December 1998	15:00	Semifinals
Wednesday, 9 December 1998	08:30	Final

== Results ==
Legend

- DNS — Did not start

=== Heats ===
- Qualification: 1–4 → Semifinals (QS)

==== Heat 1 ====
Rank	Athlete	Time	Notes
1	Sergey Sergin (KAZ)	4:30.96	QS
2	Preecha Phothon (THA)	4:38.74	QS
3	Alireza Mohammadi (IRI)	4:38.88	QS
4	Sadaqat Hussain (PAK)	5:31.64	QS
—	Dzhamshed Khassanov (TJK)	DNS	

==== Heat 2 ====
Rank	Athlete	Time	Notes
1	Kang Tong-su (PRK)	4:23.77	QS
2	Andrey Shilin (UZB)	4:31.29	QS
3	Jung Kwang-soo (KOR)	4:53.16	QS
4	Jiang Yuguo (CHN)	5:08.29	QS
—	Myint Tayzar Phone (MYA)	DNS	

==== Heat 3 ====
Rank	Athlete	Time	Notes
1	Andrey Mitkovets (KGZ)	4:32.53	QS
2	Pijush Kanti Baroi (IND)	4:33.06	QS
3	Kenta Tsutsui (JPN)	4:43.79	QS
4	Tan Wen Chian (SIN)	5:48.03	QS

=== Semifinals ===
- Qualification: 1–3 → Final (QF)

==== Semifinal 1 ====
Rank	Athlete	Time	Notes
1	Andrey Shilin (UZB)	3:44.31	QF
2	Sergey Sergin (KAZ)	3:44.75	QF
3	Jiang Yuguo (CHN)	3:46.43	QF
4	Kenta Tsutsui (JPN)	3:47.58	
5	Andrey Mitkovets (KGZ)	3:48.10	
6	Alireza Mohammadi (IRI)	3:59.86	

==== Semifinal 2 ====
Rank	Athlete	Time	Notes
1	Jung Kwang-soo (KOR)	3:47.46	QF
2	Kang Tong-su (PRK)	3:55.75	QF
3	Pijush Kanti Baroi (IND)	3:56.74	QF
4	Preecha Phothon (THA)	4:01.75	
5	Sadaqat Hussain (PAK)	4:06.18	
6	Tan Wen Chian (SIN)	4:25.06	

=== Final ===
Rank	Athlete	Time
1st place, gold medalist(s)	Sergey Sergin (KAZ)	4:01.76
2nd place, silver medalist(s)	Jiang Yuguo (CHN)	4:02.71
3rd place, bronze medalist(s)	Andrey Shilin (UZB)	4:05.00
4	Jung Kwang-soo (KOR)	4:06.11
5	Kang Tong-su (PRK)	4:18.57
6	Pijush Kanti Baroi (IND)	4:22.11
