= Canoeing at the 2002 Asian Games – Men's K-1 500 metres =

Men's K-1 500 metres at the 2002 Asian Games
- Venue: Nakdong River
- Date: 12 October 2002
- Competitors: 7 from 7 nations

Medalists
| gold medal | Anton Ryakhov | Uzbekistan |
| silver medal | Jung Kwang-soo | South Korea |
| bronze medal | Qu Xianwu | China |

The men's K-1 500 metres sprint canoeing competition at the 2002 Asian Games in Busan was held on 12 October at the Nakdong River.

== Schedule ==
All times are Korea Standard Time (UTC+09:00)

| Date | Time | Event |
|---|---|---|
| Saturday, 12 October 2002 | 09:40 | Final |

== Results ==
| Rank | Athlete | Time |
|---|---|---|
| 1st place, gold medalist(s) | Anton Ryakhov (UZB) | 1:40.483 |
| 2nd place, silver medalist(s) | Jung Kwang-soo (KOR) | 1:41.707 |
| 3rd place, bronze medalist(s) | Qu Xianwu (CHN) | 1:42.325 |
| 4 | Alexandr Yemelyanov (KAZ) | 1:43.237 |
| 5 | Naoki Onoto (JPN) | 1:43.549 |
| 6 | Lo Ho Yin (HKG) | 2:02.557 |
| 7 | Oidovyn Jamiyan (MGL) | 2:26.023 |
