= Canoeing at the 1998 Asian Games – Men's K-2 500 metres =

Men's K-2 500 metres at the 1998 Asian Games
- Venue: Map Prachan Reservoir
- Date: 10–11 December 1998
- Competitors: 30 from 15 nations

Medalists
gold medal	Dmitriy Torlopov; Dmitriy Kaltenberger	Kazakhstan
silver medal	Fang Lei; Wang Guizhong	China
bronze medal	Vladimir Kazantsev; Andrey Shilin	Uzbekistan

The men's K-2 500 metres sprint canoeing competition at the 1998 Asian Games in Thailand was held on 10 and 11 December at Map Prachan Reservoir.

== Schedule ==
All times are Indochina Time (UTC+07:00)

Date	Time	Event
Thursday, 10 December 1998	08:30	Heats
Thursday, 10 December 1998	15:00	Semifinals
Friday, 11 December 1998	08:30	Final

== Results ==
Legend

- DNS — Did not start

=== Heats ===
- Qualification: 1–4 → Semifinals (QS)

==== Heat 1 ====
Rank	Team	Time	Notes
1	China (CHN); Fang Lei; Wang Guizhong	1:39.06	QS
2	Myanmar (MYA); Khin Maung Myint; Myint Tayzar Phone	1:42.76	QS
3	India (IND); Vinod Pavithran; Karma Toppo	1:46.00	QS
4	Thailand (THA); S. Chantrapoon; Supagorn Lapkongsilp	1:53.08	QS
5	Philippines (PHI); Tomas Artigas; Jose Regalado	2:02.71	

==== Heat 2 ====
Rank	Team	Time	Notes
1	Uzbekistan (UZB); Vladimir Kazantsev; Andrey Shilin	1:44.23	QS
2	North Korea (PRK); Han Chol-su; Ryong Sang-hyok	1:48.52	QS
3	Hong Kong (HKG); Shek Wing Wai; Lo Ho Yin	1:49.52	QS
4	Pakistan (PAK); Azhar Hussain; Ashiq Elahi	1:54.08	QS
—	Tajikistan (TJK); Nodirjon Safarov; Dzhamshed Khassanov	DNS	

==== Heat 3 ====
Rank	Team	Time	Notes
1	Indonesia (INA); Sayadin; Laode Hadi	1:41.58	QS
2	Kazakhstan (KAZ); Dmitriy Torlopov; Dmitriy Kaltenberger	1:42.18	QS
3	Iran (IRI); Mohsen Milad; Alireza Sohrabian	1:44.62	QS
4	Kyrgyzstan (KGZ); Andrey Mitkovets; Dmitry Semikin	1:46.48	QS
5	South Korea (KOR); Min Kyung-soo; Lee Dong-Keun	1:47.90	

=== Semifinals ===
- Qualification: 1–3 → Final (QF)

==== Semifinal 1 ====
Rank	Team	Time	Notes
1	China (CHN); Fang Lei; Wang Guizhong	1:36.28	QF
2	Indonesia (INA); Sayadin; Laode Hadi	1:36.95	QF
3	Iran (IRI); Mohsen Milad; Alireza Sohrabian	1:38.02	QF
4	North Korea (PRK); Han Chol-su; Ryong Sang-hyok	1:43.08	
5	India (IND); Vinod Pavithran; Karma Toppo	1:43.43	
6	Pakistan (PAK); Azhar Hussain; Ashiq Elahi	1:47.48	

==== Semifinal 2 ====
Rank	Team	Time	Notes
1	Kazakhstan (KAZ); Dmitriy Torlopov; Dmitriy Kaltenberger	1:36.25	QF
2	Uzbekistan (UZB); Vladimir Kazantsev; Andrey Shilin	1:37.26	QF
3	Kyrgyzstan (KGZ); Andrey Mitkovets; Dmitry Semikin	1:38.83	QF
4	Myanmar (MYA); Khin Maung Myint; Myint Tayzar Phone	1:40.20	
5	Hong Kong (HKG); Shek Wing Wai; Lo Ho Yin	1:44.81	
6	Thailand (THA); S. Chantrapoon; Supagorn Lapkongsilp	1:52.99	

=== Final ===
Rank	Team	Time
1st place, gold medalist(s)	Kazakhstan (KAZ); Dmitriy Torlopov; Dmitriy Kaltenberger	1:39.01
2nd place, silver medalist(s)	China (CHN); Fang Lei; Wang Guizhong	1:39.22
3rd place, bronze medalist(s)	Uzbekistan (UZB); Vladimir Kazantsev; Andrey Shilin	1:41.16
4	Indonesia (INA); Sayadin; Laode Hadi	1:41.55
5	Kyrgyzstan (KGZ); Andrey Mitkovets; Dmitry Semikin	1:45.73
6	Iran (IRI); Mohsen Milad; Alireza Sohrabian	1:52.11
