= Irina Lyalina =

Uzbekistani canoeist (born 1968)

Personal information
- Born: February 3, 1968 (age 58)
Medal record
Women's canoe sprint
Representing Uzbekistan
Asian Games
Silver medal – second place	1994 Hiroshima	K-1 500 m
Silver medal – second place	1994 Hiroshima	K-4 500 m
Silver medal – second place	1998 Bangkok	K-4 500 m

Irina Lyalina (Ирина Лялина, born February 3, 1968) is an Uzbekistani sprint canoer who competed in the mid-1990s. At the 1996 Summer Olympics in Atlanta, she was eliminated in the repechages of the K-1 500 m event and the semifinals of the K-4 500 m event.
