= Canoeing at the 1998 Asian Games – Men's K-1 500 metres =

Men's K-1 500 metres at the 1998 Asian Games
- Venue: Map Prachan Reservoir
- Date: 10–11 December 1998
- Competitors: 16 from 16 nations

Medalists
gold medal	Yevgeniy Yegorov	Kazakhstan
silver medal	Anton Ryakhov	Uzbekistan
bronze medal	Kenta Tsutsui	Japan

The men's K-1 500 metres sprint canoeing competition at the 1998 Asian Games in Thailand was held on 10 and 11 December at Map Prachan Reservoir.

== Schedule ==
All times are Indochina Time (UTC+07:00)

Date	Time	Event
Thursday, 10 December 1998	08:30	Heats
Thursday, 10 December 1998	15:00	Semifinals
Friday, 11 December 1998	08:30	Final

== Results ==
Legend

- DNS — Did not start
- DSQ — Disqualified

=== Heats ===
- Qualification: 1–4 → Semifinals (QS)

==== Heat 1 ====
Rank	Athlete	Time	Notes
1	Yevgeniy Yegorov (KAZ)	1:45.01	QS
2	Anton Ryakhov (UZB)	1:47.78	QS
3	Ren Yongchang (CHN)	1:50.00	QS
4	Kang Tong-su (PRK)	1:51.20	QS
5	Absir (INA)	1:53.70	
6	Tan Wen Chian (SIN)	2:04.74	

==== Heat 2 ====
Rank	Athlete	Time	Notes
1	Jung Kwang-soo (KOR)	1:46.18	QS
2	Hossein Fathalizadeh (IRI)	1:46.79	QS
3	Kenta Tsutsui (JPN)	1:49.40	QS
4	Khin Maung Myint (MYA)	1:50.13	QS
5	Prem Kumar Rai (IND)	1:56.43	

==== Heat 3 ====
Rank	Athlete	Time	Notes
1	Preecha Phothon (THA)	1:55.27	QS
2	Chu Wai Ho (HKG)	2:05.51	QS
3	Sadaqat Hussain (PAK)	2:07.21	QS
4	Yury Uliachenko (KGZ)	2:19.04	QS
—	Rinat Akhmetshin (TJK)	DNS	

=== Semifinals ===
- Qualification: 1–3 → Final (QF)

==== Semifinal 1 ====
Rank	Athlete	Time	Notes
1	Yevgeniy Yegorov (KAZ)	1:46.94	QF
2	Hossein Fathalizadeh (IRI)	1:52.50	QF
3	Ren Yongchang (CHN)	1:53.44	QF
4	Khin Maung Myint (MYA)	1:56.24	
5	Sadaqat Hussain (PAK)	2:02.05	
6	Preecha Phothon (THA)	2:03.51	

==== Semifinal 2 ====
Rank	Athlete	Time	Notes
1	Jung Kwang-soo (KOR)	1:48.41	QF
2	Anton Ryakhov (UZB)	1:49.07	QF
3	Kenta Tsutsui (JPN)	1:52.33	QF
4	Yury Uliachenko (KGZ)	1:53.89	
5	Kang Tong-su (PRK)	1:55.18	
6	Chu Wai Ho (HKG)	2:05.35	

=== Final ===
Rank	Athlete	Time
1st place, gold medalist(s)	Yevgeniy Yegorov (KAZ)	1:49.52
2nd place, silver medalist(s)	Anton Ryakhov (UZB)	1:54.15
3rd place, bronze medalist(s)	Kenta Tsutsui (JPN)	1:55.51
4	Jung Kwang-soo (KOR)	1:56.28
5	Ren Yongchang (CHN)	2:03.33
—	Hossein Fathalizadeh (IRI)	DSQ
