= Fan Lina =

Chinese sprint canoer

Medal record

Women's canoe sprint

World Championships
Silver medal – second place	2002 Seville	K-4 1000 m

Fan Lina is a Chinese sprint canoer who competed in the early 2000s. She won a silver medal in the K-4 1000 m event at the 2002 ICF Canoe Sprint World Championships in Seville.
