= Nam Sung-ho =

South Korean canoeist

Personal information
- Born: October 10, 1975 (age 50)
- Height: 181 cm (5 ft 11 in)
- Weight: 79 kg (174 lb)
Medal record
Men's canoe sprint
Representing South Korea
Asian Games
Silver medal – second place	2002 Busan	K-1 1000 m
Silver medal – second place	2002 Busan	K-2 500 m
Silver medal – second place	2002 Busan	K-2 1000 m
Bronze medal – third place	1994 Hiroshima	K-2 1000 m
Asian Championships
Bronze medal – third place	2005 Putrajaya	K-1 500 m
Bronze medal – third place	2005 Putrajaya	K-2 1000 m

Nam Sung-Ho (남성호, born October 10, 1975) is a South Korean sprint canoer who competed in the early 2000s. At the 2000 Summer Olympics in Sydney, he was eliminated in the semifinals of both the K-1 500 m and the K-1 1000 m events.
