= Xu Linbei =

Chinese canoeist

Medal record

Women's canoe sprint

Representing China

World Championships
Silver medal – second place	2002 Seville	K-4 1000 m

Asian Championships
Gold medal – first place	2007 Hwacheon	K-2 200 m
Gold medal – first place	2007 Hwacheon	K-2 500 m
Gold medal – first place	2007 Hwacheon	K-2 1000 m

Xu Linbei (born November 19, 1983, in Wafangdian, Dalian, Liaoning) is a Chinese sprint canoer who has competed since the early 2000s. She won a silver medal in the K-4 1000 m event at the 2002 ICF Canoe Sprint World Championships in Seville, Spain.

Xu also competed in two Summer Olympics, earning her best finish of fourth in the K-2 500 m event at Athens in 2004.
