= He Jing (canoeist) =

Chinese canoeist

Personal information
- Native name: 何静
- Nationality: Chinese
- Born: 10 October 1983 (age 42) Jingdezhen, Jiangxi
- Height: 1.74 m (5 ft 9 in)
- Weight: 71 kg (157 lb)

Sport
- Country: China
- Sport: male sprint canoeist
- Retired: yes
Medal record
Women's canoe sprint
Representing China
World Championships
Silver medal – second place	2007 Duisburg	K-4 1000 m
Bronze medal – third place	2006 Szeged	K-4 1000 m
Asian Championships
Gold medal – first place	2005 Putrajaya	K-4 500 m
Gold medal – first place	2005 Putrajaya	K-4 1000 m
Gold medal – first place	2007 Hwacheon	K-1 1000 m

He Jing
- Traditional Chinese: 何靜
- Simplified Chinese: 何静
Transcriptions
Standard Mandarin
- Hanyu Pinyin: hé jìng

He Jing (Chinese: 何静; pinyin: Hé Jìng; born October 10, 1983, in Jingdezhen, Jiangxi) is a Chinese sprint canoer who competed since the mid-2000s. She won two medals in the K-4 1000 m event at the ICF Canoe Sprint World Championships with a silver in 2007 and a bronze in 2006.

She also finished seventh in the K-4 500 m event at the 2004 Summer Olympics in Athens.
