= Dmitry Strykov =

Uzbekistani canoeist (born 1982)

Dmitry Strykov (born September 13, 1982) is an Uzbekistani sprint canoer who competed in the mid-2000s. He was eliminated in the semifinals of the K-4 1000 m event at the 2004 Summer Olympics in Athens.
