= Ellina Uzhakhova =

Kazakhstani canoeist

Elina Uzhakhova (born 18 July 1982) is a Kazakhstani sprint canoer who competed in the mid-2000s. At the 2004 Summer Olympics, she was eliminated in the semifinals of the K-2 500 m event.
