= Miho Adachi =

Japanese canoeist (born 1979)

Miho Adachi (安達美穂, Adachi Miho; born 19 June 1979) is a Japanese sprint canoer who competed in the mid-2000s. She finished ninth in the K-4 500 m event at the 2004 Summer Olympics in Athens.
