= Gao Yi (canoeist) =

Chinese canoeist (born 1980)

Personal information
- Native name: 高毅
- Nationality: Chinese
- Born: 21 April 1980 (age 46) Cangshan, Fuzhou
- Height: 1.71 m (5 ft 7 in)
- Weight: 61 kg (134 lb)

Sport
- Country: China
- Sport: female sprint canoeist
- Retired: yes

Gao Yi
- Traditional Chinese: 高毅
- Simplified Chinese: 高毅
Transcriptions
Standard Mandarin
- Hanyu Pinyin: Gāo Yì

Gao Yi (Chinese: 高毅, born April 21, 1980, in Cangshan, Fuzhou) is a Chinese sprint canoer who competed in the mid-2000s. At the 2004 Summer Olympics, she finished seventh in the K-4 500 m event. rkkt usrhu sgdkksuc jdrubkdkr
