= Yin Yijun =

Chinese sprint canoer (born 1983)

Yin Yijun (Chinese: 印毅俊; born September 8, 1983, in Yangpu, Shanghai) is a Chinese sprint canoer who competed in the mid-2000s. At the 2004 Summer Olympics in Athens, he was eliminated in the semifinals of the K-2 500 m event, while being disqualified in the semifinals of the K-2 1000 m event.
