= Yuliya Borzova =

Uzbekistani sprint canoer (born 1981)

Personal information
- Born: January 14, 1981 (age 45)
Medal record
Women's sprint canoe
Representing Uzbekistan
Asian Games
Gold medal – first place	2002 Busan	K-4 500 m
Gold medal – first place	2006 Doha	K-1 500 m
Silver medal – second place	2002 Busan	K-1 500 m
Silver medal – second place	2010 Guangzhou	K-4 1000 m
Asian Championships
Gold medal – first place	2005 Putrajaya	K-1 200 m
Gold medal – first place	2009 Tehran	K-1 5000 m
Gold medal – first place	2009 Tehran	K-4 200 m
Gold medal – first place	2009 Tehran	K-4 500 m
Gold medal – first place	2022 Rayong	K-2 200 m
Gold medal – first place	2022 Rayong	K-4 200 m
Silver medal – second place	2005 Putrajaya	K-1 500 m
Silver medal – second place	2005 Putrajaya	K-1 1000 m
Silver medal – second place	2005 Putrajaya	K-4 200 m
Silver medal – second place	2005 Putrajaya	K-4 500 m
Silver medal – second place	2009 Tehran	K-1 200 m
Silver medal – second place	2009 Tehran	K-1 500 m
Silver medal – second place	2011 Tehran	K-2 200 m
Silver medal – second place	2022 Rayong	K-4 500 m
Silver medal – second place	2022 Rayong	K-4 1000 m
Bronze medal – third place	2005 Putrajaya	K-2 200 m
Bronze medal – third place	2005 Putrajaya	K-4 1000 m
Bronze medal – third place	2009 Tehran	K-4 1000 m
Bronze medal – third place	2011 Tehran	K-1 200 m
Bronze medal – third place	2011 Tehran	K-1 500 m
Bronze medal – third place	2011 Tehran	K-2 500 m
Bronze medal – third place	2015 Palembang	K-1 500 m
Bronze medal – third place	2022 Rayong	K-2 500 m

Yuliya Borzova (born January 14, 1981) is an Uzbekistani sprint canoer who competed since the mid-2000s. At the 2004 Summer Olympics in Athens, she was eliminated in the semifinals of the K-1 500 m event. At the 2012 Summer Olympics, she was eliminated in the semi-finals of the K-1 200 m event and the K-1 500 m event.
