= Yumiko Suzuki (canoeist) =

Japanese sprint canoer (born 1976)

Medal record

Women's canoe sprint

Representing Japan

Asian Championships
Silver medal – second place	2007 Hwacheon	K-2 200 m
Silver medal – second place	2007 Hwacheon	K-2 500 m
Silver medal – second place	2007 Hwacheon	K-4 200 m
Bronze medal – third place	2007 Hwacheon	K-4 500 m
Bronze medal – third place	2007 Hwacheon	K-4 1000 m

Yumiko Suzuki (鈴木 祐美子, Suzuki Yumiko; born January 13, 1976) is a Japanese sprint canoer who has competed since the mid-2000s. Competing in two Summer Olympics, she earned her best finish of sixth in the K-4 500 m event at Beijing in 2008.
