= Natalya Sergeyeva =

Kazakhstani canoeist (born 1976)

Personal information
- Born: 3 May 1976 (age 50) Temirtau, Kazakhstan
- Height: 164 cm (5 ft 5 in)
- Weight: 64 kg (141 lb)
Medal record
Women's canoeing
Representing Kazakhstan
Asian Games
Silver medal – second place	1998 Bangkok	K-2 500 m
Silver medal – second place	2002 Busan	K-2 500 m
Silver medal – second place	2010 Guangzhou	K-1 500 m
Bronze medal – third place	2002 Busan	K-1 500 m
Bronze medal – third place	2006 Doha	K-1 500 m
Bronze medal – third place	2010 Guangzhou	K-1 200 m
Asian Championships
Gold medal – first place	2009 Tehran	K-1 200 m
Gold medal – first place	2009 Tehran	K-1 500 m
Gold medal – first place	2009 Tehran	K-1 1000 m
Gold medal – first place	2013 Samarkand	K-4 500 m
Gold medal – first place	2022 Rayong	K-4 500 m
Gold medal – first place	2022 Rayong	K-4 1000 m
Silver medal – second place	2007 Hwacheon	K-4 500 m
Silver medal – second place	2007 Hwacheon	K-4 1000 m
Silver medal – second place	2009 Tehran	K-4 200 m
Silver medal – second place	2013 Samarkand	K-1 1000 m
Silver medal – second place	2013 Samarkand	K-2 200 m
Silver medal – second place	2013 Samarkand	K-2 500 m
Silver medal – second place	2015 Palembang	K-2 500 m
Silver medal – second place	2015 Palembang	K-4 500 m
Silver medal – second place	2017 Shanghai	K-2 500 m
Silver medal – second place	2017 Shanghai	K-4 200 m
Silver medal – second place	2017 Shanghai	K-4 500 m
Silver medal – second place	2017 Shanghai	K-4 1000 m
Silver medal – second place	2022 Rayong	K-4 200 m
Bronze medal – third place	2007 Hwacheon	K-1 200 m
Bronze medal – third place	2007 Hwacheon	K-2 200 m
Bronze medal – third place	2013 Samarkand	K-1 500 m
Bronze medal – third place	2017 Shanghai	K-2 200 m

Natalya Sergeyeva (Наталья Сергеева, born 3 May 1976) is a Kazakhstani sprint canoe racer who competed from the mid-2000s. At the 2004 Summer Olympics in Athens, she was eliminated in the semi-finals of the K-2 500 m event while being disqualified in the heats of the K-1 500 m event. At the 2012 Summer Olympics she was eliminated in the semi-finals of the K-1 200 m. In the K-1 500 m she reached the B Final.

Sergeyeva competed for Kazakhstan at the 2016 Summer Olympics in the K-2 500 m and K-4 500 m events. She also represented Kazakhstan at the 2020 Summer Olympics in the K-1 200 m and K-1 500 m events.
