= Liu Haitao (canoeist) =

Chinese canoeist (born 1983)

Personal information
- Native name: 劉海濤
- Nationality: Chinese
- Born: 18 March 1983 (age 43) Suixian, Henan
- Height: 1.89 m (6 ft 2 in)
- Weight: 90 kg (200 lb)

Sport
- Country: China
- Sport: male sprint canoeist
Medal record
Men's canoe sprint
Representing China
Asian Championships
Gold medal – first place	2007 Hwacheon	K-4 200 m
Gold medal – first place	2007 Hwacheon	K-4 500 m
Gold medal – first place	2007 Hwacheon	K-4 1000 m
Silver medal – second place	2005 Putrajaya	K-2 500 m
Silver medal – second place	2005 Putrajaya	K-4 200 m
Bronze medal – third place	2005 Putrajaya	K-1 1000 m

Liu Haitao (Chinese: 劉海濤; born March 18, 1983, in Suixian, Henan) is a Chinese sprint canoer. He has competed since the mid-2000s. Participating in two Summer Olympics, he earned his best finish of seventh in the K-4 1000 m event at Beijing in 2008.
