= Canoeing at the 2010 Asian Games =

- Venue: Guangzhou International Rowing Centre
- Dates: 13–26 November 2010
- Competitors: 178 from 20 nations

Canoeing at the 2010 Asian Games was held at the International Rowing Centre in Guangzhou, China from November 13 to 26, 2010. Men's and women's competition were held in Kayak and men's competition in Canoe.

== Schedule ==
H	Heats	S	Semifinal	F	Final

Event↓/Date →	13th Sat	14th Sun		15th Mon	16th Tue		17th Wed	18th Thu	19th Fri	20th Sat	21st Sun	22nd Mon	23rd Tue	24th Wed	25th Thu	26th Fri
Slalom
Men's C-1	H	S	F													
Men's C-2				H	S	F										
Men's K-1	H	S	F													
Women's K-1				H	S	F										
Sprint
Men's C-1 200 m												H	S			F
Men's C-1 1000 m												H	S		F	
Men's C-2 1000 m															F	
Men's K-1 200 m												H	S			F
Men's K-1 1000 m												H	S		F	
Men's K-2 200 m												H	S			F
Men's K-2 1000 m												H	S		F	
Men's K-4 1000 m												H	S		F	
Women's K-1 200 m												H	S			F
Women's K-1 500 m												H	S			F
Women's K-2 500 m												H	S			F
Women's K-4 500 m															F	

== Medalists ==
=== Slalom ===
==== Men ====
Event	Gold	Silver	Bronze
C-1	Teng Zhiqiang; China	Takuya Haneda; Japan	Chen Fangjia; China
C-2	China; Hu Minghai; Shu Junrong	China; Chen Fei; Shan Bao	Uzbekistan; Aleksey Zubarev; Aleksey Naumkin
K-1	Huang Cunguang; China	Kazuki Yazawa; Japan	Xian Jinbin; China

==== Women ====
Event	Gold	Silver	Bronze
K-1	Zou Yingying; China	Li Jingjing; China	Asahi Yamada; Japan

=== Sprint ===
==== Men ====
Event	Gold	Silver	Bronze
C-1 200 m	Li Qiang; China	Alexandr Dyadchuk; Kazakhstan	Naoya Sakamoto; Japan
C-1 1000 m	Vadim Menkov; Uzbekistan	Shahoo Nasseri; Iran	Xie Weiyong; China
C-2 1000 m	Uzbekistan; Serik Mirbekov; Gerasim Kochnev	China; Huang Maoxing; Xie Weiyong	Kazakhstan; Mikhail Yemelyanov; Timofey Yemelyanov
K-1 200 m	Momotaro Matsushita; Japan	Zhou Peng; China	Aleksey Mochalov; Uzbekistan
K-1 1000 m	Ahmad Reza Talebian; Iran	Pan Yao; China	Yasuhiro Suzuki; Japan
K-1 1000 m	Ahmad Reza Talebian; Iran	Pan Yao; China	Aleksandr Parol; Kyrgyzstan
K-2 200 m	Japan; Momotaro Matsushita; Keiji Mizumoto	Uzbekistan; Sergey Borzov; Aleksey Babadjanov	China; Hu Yonglin; Wang Lei
K-2 1000 m	China; Huang Zhipeng; Xu Haitao	Kazakhstan; Alexandr Yemelyanov; Alexey Dergunov	Japan; Keiji Mizumoto; Hiroki Watanabe
K-4 1000 m	Uzbekistan; Sergey Borzov; Aleksey Babadjanov; Aleksey Mochalov; Vyacheslav Gorn	Kazakhstan; Alexandr Yemelyanov; Yevgeniy Alexeyev; Dmitriy Torlopov; Yevgeniy Yegorov	Iran; Hossein Sinkaei; Ahmad Reza Talebian; Farzin Asadi; Amin Boudaghi

==== Women ====
Event	Gold	Silver	Bronze
K-1 200 m	Shinobu Kitamoto; Japan	Zhou Yu; China	Natalya Sergeyeva; Kazakhstan
K-1 500 m	Zhou Yu; China	Natalya Sergeyeva; Kazakhstan	Shinobu Kitamoto; Japan
K-2 500 m	China; Wang Feng; Yu Lamei	Japan; Shinobu Kitamoto; Asumi Omura	Kazakhstan; Yelena Podoinikova; Irina Podoinikova
K-4 500 m	China; Wang Feng; Yu Lamei; Ren Wenjun; Wu Yanan	Uzbekistan; Yuliya Borzova; Viktoria Petrishina; Ekaterina Shubina; Ksenia Prilepskaya	Japan; Asumi Omura; Yumiko Suzuki; Ayaka Kuno; Shiho Kakizaki

== Medal table ==
Rank	Nation	Gold	Silver	Bronze	Total
1	China (CHN)	9	6	4	19
2	Japan (JPN)	3	3	6	12
3	Uzbekistan (UZB)	3	2	2	7
4	Iran (IRI)	1	1	1	3
5	Kazakhstan (KAZ)	0	4	3	7
6	Kyrgyzstan (KGZ)	0	0	1	1
Totals (6 entries)		16	16	17	49

== Participating nations ==
A total of 178 athletes from 20 nations competed in canoeing at the 2010 Asian Games:

- China (25)
- Chinese Taipei (6)
- Hong Kong (1)
- India (12)
- Indonesia (6)
- Iran (13)
- Japan (17)
- Kazakhstan (17)
- Kyrgyzstan (7)
- Lebanon (1)
- Macau (7)
- Mongolia (6)
- North Korea (4)
- Philippines (2)
- Singapore (6)
- South Korea (11)
- Tajikistan (4)
- Thailand (9)
- Uzbekistan (19)
- Vietnam (5)
