= Canoeing at the 2010 Asian Games – Women's K-4 500 metres =

Women's K-4 500 metres at the 2010 Asian Games
- Venue: Guangzhou International Rowing Centre
- Date: 25 November 2010
- Competitors: 20 from 5 nations

Medalists
gold medal	China; Wang Feng, Yu Lamei, Ren Wenjun, Wu Yanan
silver medal	Uzbekistan; Yuliya Borzova, Viktoria Petrishina, Ekaterina Shubina, Ksenia Prilepskaya
bronze medal	Japan; Asumi Omura, Yumiko Suzuki, Ayaka Kuno, Shiho Kakizaki

The women's K-4 500 metres sprint canoeing competition at the 2010 Asian Games in Guangzhou was held on 25 November at the International Rowing Centre.

== Schedule ==
All times are China Standard Time (UTC+08:00)

Date	Time	Event
Thursday, 25 November 2010	11:00	Final

== Results ==
Rank	Team	Time
1st place, gold medalist(s)	China (CHN); Wang Feng; Yu Lamei; Ren Wenjun; Wu Yanan	1:34.440
2nd place, silver medalist(s)	Uzbekistan (UZB); Yuliya Borzova; Viktoria Petrishina; Ekaterina Shubina; Ksenia Prilepskaya	1:37.776
3rd place, bronze medalist(s)	Japan (JPN); Asumi Omura; Yumiko Suzuki; Ayaka Kuno; Shiho Kakizaki	1:39.187
4	Kazakhstan (KAZ); Yelena Podoinikova; Irina Podoinikova; Olga Ponomaryova; Olga Shmelyova	1:39.703
5	Singapore (SIN); Irene Chua; Geraldine Lee; Andrea Chen; Annabelle Ng	1:40.483
