= Canoeing at the 2010 Asian Games – Women's K-2 500 metres =

Women's K-2 500 metres at the 2010 Asian Games
- Venue: Guangzhou International Rowing Centre
- Date: 22–26 November 2010
- Competitors: 24 from 12 nations

Medalists
| gold medal | Wang Feng; Yu Lamei | China |
| silver medal | Shinobu Kitamoto; Asumi Omura | Japan |
| bronze medal | Yelena Podoinikova; Irina Podoinikova | Kazakhstan |

The women's K-2 500 metres sprint canoeing competition at the 2010 Asian Games in Guangzhou was held from 22 to 26 November at the International Rowing Centre.

== Schedule ==
All times are China Standard Time (UTC+08:00)

| Date | Time | Event |
|---|---|---|
| Monday, 22 November 2010 | 16:50 | Heats |
| Tuesday, 23 November 2010 | 16:20 | Semifinal |
| Frisday, 26 November 2010 | 12:30 | Final |

== Results ==
Legend

- DNF — Did not finish

=== Heats ===
- Qualification: 1–3 → Final (QF), Rest → Semifinal (QS)

==== Heat 1 ====
| Rank | Athlete | Time | Notes |
|---|---|---|---|
| 1 | Japan (JPN); Shinobu Kitamoto; Asumi Omura | 1:44.642 | QF |
| 2 | South Korea (KOR); Yoo Mi-na; Shin Jin-ah | 1:52.487 | QF |
| 3 | Indonesia (INA); Sarce Aronggear; Rasima | 1:56.237 | QF |
| 4 | North Korea (PRK); Jang Ok-gyong; Hwang Hyon-ok | 1:57.091 | QS |
| 5 | India (IND); Ragina Kiro; Dung Dung Sima | 2:00.462 | QS |
| — | Macau (MAC); Leong Wai Sim; Ieong Pui Peng | DNF | |

==== Heat 2 ====
| Rank | Athlete | Time | Notes |
|---|---|---|---|
| 1 | China (CHN); Wang Feng; Yu Lamei | 1:45.533 | QF |
| 2 | Kazakhstan (KAZ); Yelena Podoinikova; Irina Podoinikova | 1:48.879 | QF |
| 3 | Uzbekistan (UZB); Viktoria Petrishina; Ekaterina Shubina | 1:49.845 | QF |
| 4 | Iran (IRI); Dorsa Kafili; Sima Orouji | 1:50.302 | QS |
| 5 | Singapore (SIN); Suzanne Seah; Stephenie Chen | 1:54.214 | QS |
| 6 | Mongolia (MGL); Batjargalyn Gereltuyaa; Erdenebatyn Khulan | 2:47.825 | QS |

=== Semifinal ===
- Qualification: 1–3 → Final (QF)

| Rank | Athlete | Time | Notes |
|---|---|---|---|
| 1 | Iran (IRI); Dorsa Kafili; Sima Orouji | 1:52.866 | QF |
| 2 | Singapore (SIN); Suzanne Seah; Stephenie Chen | 1:55.184 | QF |
| 3 | North Korea (PRK); Jang Ok-gyong; Hwang Hyon-ok | 1:58.259 | QF |
| 4 | India (IND); Ragina Kiro; Dung Dung Sima | 2:01.147 | |
| 5 | Mongolia (MGL); Batjargalyn Gereltuyaa; Erdenebatyn Khulan | 2:44.455 | |

=== Final ===
| Rank | Athlete | Time |
|---|---|---|
| 1st place, gold medalist(s) | China (CHN); Wang Feng; Yu Lamei | 1:42.993 |
| 2nd place, silver medalist(s) | Japan (JPN); Shinobu Kitamoto; Asumi Omura | 1:44.308 |
| 3rd place, bronze medalist(s) | Kazakhstan (KAZ); Yelena Podoinikova; Irina Podoinikova | 1:49.577 |
| 4 | Uzbekistan (UZB); Viktoria Petrishina; Ekaterina Shubina | 1:50.310 |
| 5 | South Korea (KOR); Yoo Mi-na; Shin Jin-ah | 1:50.631 |
| 6 | Iran (IRI); Dorsa Kafili; Sima Orouji | 1:52.707 |
| 7 | Singapore (SIN); Suzanne Seah; Stephenie Chen | 1:53.470 |
| 8 | Indonesia (INA); Sarce Aronggear; Rasima | 1:53.966 |
| 9 | North Korea (PRK); Jang Ok-gyong; Hwang Hyon-ok | 1:58.224 |
