= Canoeing at the 2014 Asian Games – Women's K-2 500 metres =

Women's K-2 500 metres at the 2014 Asian Games
- Venue: Misari Regatta
- Date: 27–29 September 2014
- Competitors: 22 from 11 nations

Medalists
gold medal	Natalya Sergeyeva; Irina Podoinikova	Kazakhstan
silver medal	Ren Wenjun; Ma Qing	China
bronze medal	Asumi Omura; Shiho Kakizaki	Japan

The women's K-2 500 metres sprint canoeing competition at the 2014 Asian Games in Hanam was held from 27 to 29 September at the Misari Canoe/Kayak Center.

== Schedule ==
All times are Korea Standard Time (UTC+09:00)

Date	Time	Event
Saturday, 27 September 2014	14:40	Heats
Sunday, 28 September 2014	14:05	Semifinal
Monday, 29 September 2014	16:00	Final

== Results ==
=== Heats ===
- Qualification: 1–3 → Final (QF), Rest → Semifinal (QS)

==== Heat 1 ====
Rank	Team	Time	Notes
1	China (CHN); Ren Wenjun; Ma Qing	1:41.486	QF
2	Japan (JPN); Asumi Omura; Shiho Kakizaki	1:43.772	QF
3	Iran (IRI); Mina Abdollahi; Hedieh Kazemi	1:49.723	QF
4	Thailand (THA); Woraporn Boonyuhong; Kanokpan Suansan	1:50.053	QS
5	Chinese Taipei (TPE); Liu Yen-ting; Liu Hui-chi	1:52.299	QS
6	Macau (MAC); Louisa Cheong; Ng Si Cheng	2:23.701	QS

==== Heat 2 ====
Rank	Team	Time	Notes
1	Kazakhstan (KAZ); Natalya Sergeyeva; Irina Podoinikova	1:42.680	QF
2	South Korea (KOR); Lee Hye-ran; Kim You-jin	1:47.366	QF
3	Uzbekistan (UZB); Kseniya Kalinina; Viktoria Osokina	1:47.579	QF
4	Singapore (SIN); Stephenie Chen; Suzanne Seah	1:49.339	QS
5	India (IND); Ragina Kiro; A. Nanao Devi	1:58.155	QS

=== Semifinal ===
- Qualification: 1–3 → Final (QF)

Rank	Team	Time	Notes
1	Singapore (SIN); Stephenie Chen; Suzanne Seah	1:51.889	QF
2	Thailand (THA); Woraporn Boonyuhong; Kanokpan Suansan	1:52.389	QF
3	India (IND); Ragina Kiro; A. Nanao Devi	1:52.975	QF
4	Chinese Taipei (TPE); Liu Yen-ting; Liu Hui-chi	1:54.199	
5	Macau (MAC); Louisa Cheong; Ng Si Cheng	2:24.424	

=== Final ===
Rank	Team	Time
1st place, gold medalist(s)	Kazakhstan (KAZ); Natalya Sergeyeva; Irina Podoinikova	1:42.208
2nd place, silver medalist(s)	China (CHN); Ren Wenjun; Ma Qing	1:42.807
3rd place, bronze medalist(s)	Japan (JPN); Asumi Omura; Shiho Kakizaki	1:44.568
4	Uzbekistan (UZB); Kseniya Kalinina; Viktoria Osokina	1:48.650
5	South Korea (KOR); Lee Hye-ran; Kim You-jin	1:50.049
6	Thailand (THA); Woraporn Boonyuhong; Kanokpan Suansan	1:50.262
7	Singapore (SIN); Stephenie Chen; Suzanne Seah	1:50.836
8	Iran (IRI); Mina Abdollahi; Hedieh Kazemi	1:52.870
9	India (IND); Ragina Kiro; A. Nanao Devi	1:55.351
