= Canoeing at the 2010 Asian Games – Women's K-1 200 metres =

Women's K-1 200 metres at the 2010 Asian Games
- Venue: Guangzhou International Rowing Centre
- Date: 22–26 November 2010
- Competitors: 14 from 14 nations

Medalists
gold medal	Shinobu Kitamoto	Japan
silver medal	Zhou Yu	China
bronze medal	Natalya Sergeyeva	Kazakhstan

The women's K-1 200 metres sprint canoeing competition at the 2010 Asian Games in Guangzhou was held from 22 to 26 November at the International Rowing Centre.

== Schedule ==
All times are China Standard Time (UTC+08:00)

Date	Time	Event
Monday, 22 November 2010	14:00	Heats
Tuesday, 23 November 2010	14:00	Semifinal
Frisday, 26 November 2010	10:00	Final

== Results ==
=== Heats ===
- Qualification: 1–3 → Final (QF), Rest → Semifinal (QS)

==== Heat 1 ====
Rank	Athlete	Time	Notes
1	Zhou Yu (CHN)	42.054	QF
2	Natalya Sergeyeva (KAZ)	43.286	QF
3	Arezoo Motamedi (IRI)	46.026	QF
4	Sarce Aronggear (INA)	48.030	QS
5	Ragina Kiro (IND)	49.227	QS
6	Jang Ok-gyong (PRK)	50.198	QS
7	Chiang Hoi Ian (MAC)	53.925	QS

==== Heat 2 ====
Rank	Athlete	Time	Notes
1	Shinobu Kitamoto (JPN)	41.757	QF
2	Yuliya Borzova (UZB)	43.901	QF
3	Lin Ya-ping (TPE)	45.059	QF
4	Yoo Mi-na (KOR)	46.325	QS
5	Irene Chua (SIN)	47.680	QS
6	Olga Gilevich (KGZ)	49.123	QS
7	Batjargalyn Gereltuyaa (MGL)	1:12.783	QS

=== Semifinal ===
- Qualification: 1–3 → Final (QF)

Rank	Athlete	Time	Notes
1	Yoo Mi-na (KOR)	45.071	QF
2	Sarce Aronggear (INA)	45.270	QF
3	Irene Chua (SIN)	46.347	QF
4	Jang Ok-gyong (PRK)	47.875	
5	Olga Gilevich (KGZ)	48.281	
6	Ragina Kiro (IND)	49.624	
7	Chiang Hoi Ian (MAC)	52.779	
8	Batjargalyn Gereltuyaa (MGL)	1:08.281	

=== Final ===
Rank	Athlete	Time
1st place, gold medalist(s)	Shinobu Kitamoto (JPN)	41.194
2nd place, silver medalist(s)	Zhou Yu (CHN)	41.229
3rd place, bronze medalist(s)	Natalya Sergeyeva (KAZ)	42.220
4	Yuliya Borzova (UZB)	43.429
5	Lin Ya-ping (TPE)	44.572
6	Arezoo Motamedi (IRI)	44.924
7	Sarce Aronggear (INA)	45.420
8	Yoo Mi-na (KOR)	45.480
9	Irene Chua (SIN)	46.214
