= Canoeing at the 2010 Asian Games – Women's K-1 500 metres =

Women's K-1 500 metres at the 2010 Asian Games
- Venue: Guangzhou International Rowing Centre
- Date: 22–26 November 2010
- Competitors: 12 from 12 nations

Medalists
gold medal	Zhou Yu	China
silver medal	Natalya Sergeyeva	Kazakhstan
bronze medal	Shinobu Kitamoto	Japan

The women's K-1 500 metres sprint canoeing competition at the 2010 Asian Games in Guangzhou was held from 22 to 26 November at the International Rowing Centre.

== Schedule ==
All times are China Standard Time (UTC+08:00)

Date	Time	Event
Monday, 22 November 2010	15:30	Heats
Tuesday, 23 November 2010	15:15	Semifinal
Frisday, 26 November 2010	12:00	Final

== Results ==
Legend

- DNS — Did not start

=== Heats ===
- Qualification: 1–3 → Final (QF), Rest → Semifinal (QS)

==== Heat 1 ====
Rank	Athlete	Time	Notes
1	Zhou Yu (CHN)	1:50.306	QF
2	Natalya Sergeyeva (KAZ)	1:51.965	QF
3	Arezoo Motamedi (IRI)	1:56.758	QF
4	Geraldine Lee (SIN)	2:02.124	QS
5	Lin Ya-ping (TPE)	2:05.591	QS
—	Erdenebatyn Khulan (MGL)	DNS	

==== Heat 2 ====
Rank	Athlete	Time	Notes
1	Shinobu Kitamoto (JPN)	1:52.886	QF
2	Yuliya Borzova (UZB)	1:56.073	QF
3	Shin Jin-ah (KOR)	1:59.243	QF
4	Ragina Kiro (IND)	2:09.270	QS
5	Olga Gilevich (KGZ)	2:10.506	QS
6	Chiang Hoi Ian (MAC)	2:19.237	QS

=== Semifinal ===
- Qualification: 1–3 → Final (QF)

Rank	Athlete	Time	Notes
1	Geraldine Lee (SIN)	2:01.351	QF
2	Lin Ya-ping (TPE)	2:06.227	QF
3	Ragina Kiro (IND)	2:07.079	QF
4	Olga Gilevich (KGZ)	2:08.128	
5	Chiang Hoi Ian (MAC)	2:18.602	

=== Final ===
Rank	Athlete	Time
1st place, gold medalist(s)	Zhou Yu (CHN)	1:48.912
2nd place, silver medalist(s)	Natalya Sergeyeva (KAZ)	1:50.393
3rd place, bronze medalist(s)	Shinobu Kitamoto (JPN)	1:53.693
4	Yuliya Borzova (UZB)	1:54.246
5	Arezoo Motamedi (IRI)	1:56.038
6	Geraldine Lee (SIN)	2:00.421
7	Lin Ya-ping (TPE)	2:04.086
8	Shin Jin-ah (KOR)	2:04.239
9	Ragina Kiro (IND)	2:10.837
