= Canoeing at the 2014 Asian Games – Women's K-1 500 metres =

Women's K-1 500 metres at the 2014 Asian Games
- Venue: Misari Regatta
- Date: 27–29 September 2014
- Competitors: 12 from 12 nations

Medalists
gold medal	Zhou Yu	China
silver medal	Natalya Sergeyeva	Kazakhstan
bronze medal	Lee Sun-ja	South Korea

The women's K-1 500 metres sprint canoeing competition at the 2014 Asian Games in Hanam was held from 27 to 29 September at the Misari Canoe/Kayak Center.

== Schedule ==
All times are Korea Standard Time (UTC+09:00)

Date	Time	Event
Saturday, 27 September 2014	11:40	Heats
Sunday, 28 September 2014	11:00	Semifinal
Monday, 29 September 2014	11:40	Final

== Results ==
=== Heats ===
- Qualification: 1–3 → Final (QF), Rest → Semifinal (QS)

==== Heat 1 ====
Rank	Athlete	Time	Notes
1	Zhou Yu (CHN)	1:56.349	QF
2	Asumi Omura (JPN)	1:58.895	QF
3	Erni Sokoy (INA)	2:04.217	QF
4	Elena Rybalova (KGZ)	2:11.870	QS
5	Anusha Biju (IND)	2:12.412	QS
6	Chiang Hoi Ian (MAC)	2:34.966	QS

==== Heat 2 ====
Rank	Athlete	Time	Notes
1	Natalya Sergeyeva (KAZ)	1:54.877	QF
2	Lee Sun-ja (KOR)	1:56.523	QF
3	Arezoo Hakimi (IRI)	1:58.803	QF
4	Maria Gorn (UZB)	2:01.054	QS
5	Geraldine Lee (SIN)	2:04.627	QS
6	Liu Hui-chi (TPE)	2:05.192	QS

=== Semifinal ===
- Qualification: 1–3 → Final (QF)

Rank	Athlete	Time	Notes
1	Maria Gorn (UZB)	2:03.599	QF
2	Geraldine Lee (SIN)	2:04.329	QF
3	Liu Hui-chi (TPE)	2:05.707	QF
4	Elena Rybalova (KGZ)	2:08.210	
5	Anusha Biju (IND)	2:11.956	
6	Chiang Hoi Ian (MAC)	2:32.433	

=== Final ===
Rank	Athlete	Time
1st place, gold medalist(s)	Zhou Yu (CHN)	1:51.334
2nd place, silver medalist(s)	Natalya Sergeyeva (KAZ)	1:52.107
3rd place, bronze medalist(s)	Lee Sun-ja (KOR)	1:54.852
4	Arezoo Hakimi (IRI)	1:55.122
5	Asumi Omura (JPN)	1:56.511
6	Maria Gorn (UZB)	2:00.422
7	Geraldine Lee (SIN)	2:02.853
8	Liu Hui-chi (TPE)	2:03.882
9	Erni Sokoy (INA)	2:04.763
