= Li Zhangli =

Chinese canoeist

Personal information
- Native name: 李章丽
- Nationality: Chinese
- Born: 23 July 1988 (age 38) Guiyang, Guizhou, China
- Height: 1.75 m (5 ft 9 in)
- Weight: 74 kg (163 lb)

Sport
- Country: China
- Sport: Canoeing
- Event: sprint canoeist
Medal record
Women's sprint canoe
Representing China
Asian Championships
Gold medal – first place	2011 Tehran	K-1 5000 m

Li Zhangli (simplified Chinese: 李章丽; traditional Chinese: 李章麗; pinyin: Li Zhānglì; born July 23, 1988, in Guiyang, Guizhou) is a Chinese sprint canoeist. Li represented China at the 2012 Summer Olympics in London, where she competed in the women's K-4 500 metres, along with her teammates Yu Lamei, Liu Haiping, and Ren Wenjun. Li and her team, however, fell short in their bid for the final, as they finished last in the semi-final round by eighteen hundredths of a second (0.18) behind the Serbian team (led by Antonia Horvat-Panda), recording the slowest time of 1:34.004.
