= Canoeing at the 2010 Asian Games – Men's C-1 200 metres =

Men's C-1 200 metres at the 2010 Asian Games
- Venue: Guangzhou International Rowing Centre
- Date: 22–26 November 2010
- Competitors: 12 from 12 nations

Medalists
gold medal	Li Qiang	China
silver medal	Alexandr Dyadchuk	Kazakhstan
bronze medal	Naoya Sakamoto	Japan

The men's C-1 200 metres sprint canoeing competition at the 2010 Asian Games in Guangzhou was held from 22 to 26 November at the International Rowing Centre.

== Schedule ==
All times are China Standard Time (UTC+08:00)

Date	Time	Event
Monday, 22 November 2010	14:20	Heats
Tuesday, 23 November 2010	14:10	Semifinal
Friday, 26 November 2010	11:00	Final

== Results ==
=== Heats ===
- Qualification: 1–3 → Final (QF), Rest → Semifinal (QS)

==== Heat 1 ====
Rank	Athlete	Time	Notes
1	Li Qiang (CHN)	41.167	QF
2	Alexandr Dyadchuk (KAZ)	42.807	QF
3	Jamesboy Singh (IND)	44.004	QF
4	Thammarat Phaophandee (THA)	44.367	QS
5	An Hyun-jin (KOR)	45.416	QS
6	Dany Funelas (PHI)	45.885	QS

==== Heat 2 ====
Rank	Athlete	Time	Notes
1	Merey Medetov (UZB)	42.369	QF
2	Naoya Sakamoto (JPN)	42.582	QF
3	Shahoo Nasseri (IRI)	43.183	QF
4	Trần Văn Long (VIE)	44.075	QS
5	Anwar Tarra (INA)	44.592	QS
6	Chen Chou Yueh-hung (TPE)	46.449	QS

=== Semifinal ===
- Qualification: 1–3 → Final (QF)

Rank	Athlete	Time	Notes
1	Trần Văn Long (VIE)	43.075	QF
2	An Hyun-jin (KOR)	43.179	QF
3	Thammarat Phaophandee (THA)	43.736	QF
4	Anwar Tarra (INA)	43.969	
5	Chen Chou Yueh-hung (TPE)	45.196	
6	Dany Funelas (PHI)	45.508	

=== Final ===
Rank	Athlete	Time
1st place, gold medalist(s)	Li Qiang (CHN)	39.603
2nd place, silver medalist(s)	Alexandr Dyadchuk (KAZ)	41.056
3rd place, bronze medalist(s)	Naoya Sakamoto (JPN)	41.261
4	Merey Medetov (UZB)	41.350
5	Shahoo Nasseri (IRI)	42.180
6	Thammarat Phaophandee (THA)	42.574
7	Trần Văn Long (VIE)	42.585
8	An Hyun-jin (KOR)	42.601
9	Jamesboy Singh (IND)	43.039
