= Anna Zelenova =

Soviet historian (1913–1980)

Anna Ivanovna Zelenova (1913-1980) was a Soviet art historian, scholar, and restorer. She was director of the Pavlovsk Palace Museum from 1941 to 1979.

She was an Honored Cultural Worker of the RSFSR (1966). She was awarded the Order of the October Revolution.

== Early life and education ==
She was born in Saint Petersburg to a family of factory workers.

She studied at the 41st FZD, formerly known as Saint Peter's School, from 1921 to 1930. In 1931, she completed drawing and design courses, while simultaneously attending required school classes.

From 1931 to 1933, she taught drawing at Giprospetsmet and headed those courses. From 1933 to 1934, she worked as a librarian at the 41st FZD.

From 1933 to 1938, she studied at the excursion and translation department of Leningrad State University and the literature faculty of Leningrad State Pedagogical Institute, attaining qualifications as an art historian and literary scholar. She earned practical experience in art history and museology, working as a tour guide at the Hermitage.

== Career ==
From 1934 to 1936, Zelenova continued to work as a tour guide at the Hermitage, the Russian Museum, and suburban palace museums. She was particularly interested in the Pavlovsk Museum Complex, with its unique park. In 1936, Zelenova began working full-time at the Pavlovsk Palace Museum as a research assistant. After some time, she became the museum's deputy director for research, and on 21 August 1941, she was appointed director of the museum and responsible for the evacuation of museum exhibits.

Taking immediate action, she organized the evacuation and secret burial of the most valuable portion of the museum's collections. On 17 September 1941, the day before the Germans captured Pavlovsk, she loaded the last truck with museum exhibits and left on foot for Leningrad.

During the siege of Leningrad, Zelenova continued her work preserving and systematizing museum treasures. In February 1942, she accepted the position of head of the Museum Department of the Lensovet's Directorate of Cultural and Educational Enterprises (UKPPL). During this period, she organized lectures and exhibitions for residents of the besieged city and for soldiers on the front lines, in hospitals, and on ships of the Baltic Fleet.

In July 1943, she began working in the National Library of Russia (RNB)'s Mass Services Department, while also organizing defense-themed exhibitions at the Vsevobuch House, the NKVD Club, and the RNB itself. On 1 July 1944, she resigned from the RNB to assume her former post as director of the Pavlovsk Palace Museum.

On 5 February 1944, Zelenova returned to the Pavlovsk Palace to begin restoration work on the museum complex. By this time, the museum was a ruin. Sappers began demining the palace, and Zelenova began drafting a methodology for its restoration. This three-volume work was subsequently adopted as the basis for the restoration of all of Leningrad's suburban palace-museums damaged during the war.

From the spring of 1944 to 1978, numerous teams of restorers worked on the restoration of the Pavlovsk Museum Complex. Under the leadership of Zelenova and Anatoly Treskin, a gigantic and unprecedented restoration of the Pavlovsk Palace and park was accomplished.

A school of Russian museum restoration was established in Pavlovsk. In 1957, the first halls of the restored Pavlovsk Palace were opened to visitors. In 1978, Pavlovsk became the first palace and museum complex in the Leningrad suburbs to be restored from ruins.

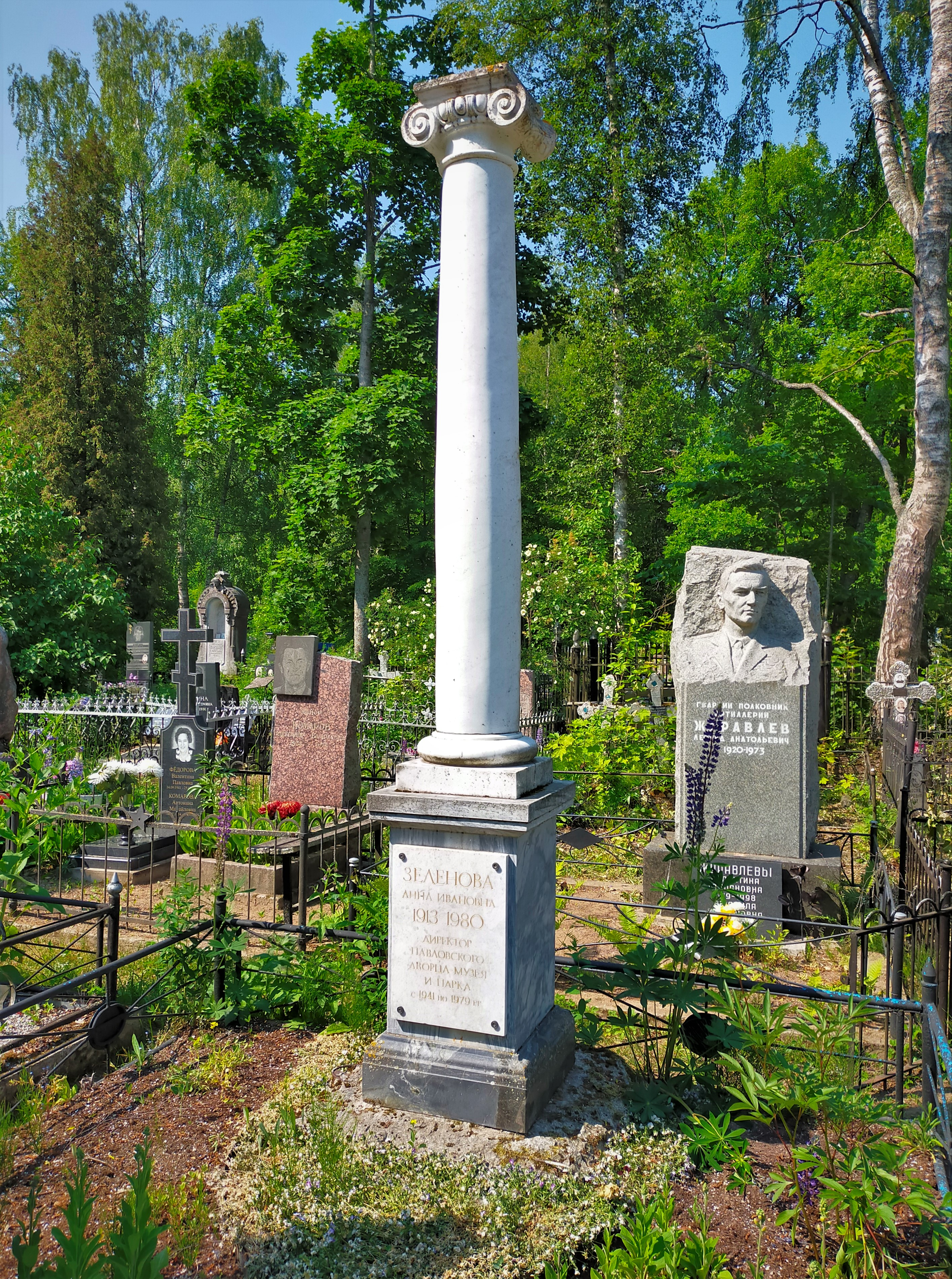
Anna Ivanovna Zelenova monument, Pavlovsk cemetery

A few months later, on 20 January 1979, Zelenova was forced to resign from her position as director of the museum due to disagreements with the “party elite” of Leningrad (in particular with Yuri Soloviev, the first secretary of the Leningrad City Committee of the CPSU).

== Death and legacy ==
A year later, in January 1980, she died of a heart attack at the age of 66 and was buried at Pavlovsk Cemetery.

In 2005, Zelenova was posthumously awarded the title of Honorary Citizen of the city of Pavlovsk.

A memorial room exhibit about her was curated at Pavlovsk Palace Museum.

A biographical film, Recollections of Pavlovsk, was directed by Irina Kalinina.
