= Canoeing at the 2010 Asian Games – Women's slalom K-1 =

Women's K-1 at the 2010 Asian Games
- Venue: Guangzhou International Rowing Centre
- Date: 15–16 November 2010
- Competitors: 6 from 5 nations

Medalists
gold medal	Zou Yingying	China
silver medal	Li Jingjing	China
bronze medal	Asahi Yamada	Japan

The women's K-1 slalom canoeing competition at the 2010 Asian Games in Guangzhou was held on 15 and 16 November at the International Rowing Centre.

== Schedule ==
All times are China Standard Time (UTC+08:00)

Date	Time	Event
Monday, 15 November 2010	10:30	Heats 1st run
Monday, 15 November 2010	11:27	Heats 2nd run
Tuesday, 16 November 2010	10:30	Semifinal
Tuesday, 16 November 2010	11:27	Final

== Results ==
=== Heats ===
Rank	Athlete	1st run			2nd run			Best
Rank	Athlete	Time	Pen.	Total	Time	Pen.	Total	Best
1	Asahi Yamada (JPN)	97.64	2	99.64	97.64	0	97.64	97.64
2	Zou Yingying (CHN)	101.04	0	101.04	95.38	4	99.38	99.38
3	Li Jingjing (CHN)	97.53	2	99.53	99.04	6	105.04	99.53
4	Yekaterina Lukicheva (KAZ)	110.55	110	220.55	104.02	0	104.02	104.02
5	Chang Chu-han (TPE)	125.87	2	127.87	126.11	4	130.11	127.87
6	Anya Suppermpool (THA)	152.01	54	206.01	142.39	8	150.39	150.39

=== Semifinal ===
Rank	Athlete	Time	Pen.	Total
1	Zou Yingying (CHN)	103.87	2	105.87
2	Li Jingjing (CHN)	105.71	4	109.71
3	Asahi Yamada (JPN)	108.34	2	110.34
4	Chang Chu-han (TPE)	128.06	4	132.06
5	Yekaterina Lukicheva (KAZ)	128.83	54	182.83
6	Anya Suppermpool (THA)	172.21	54	226.21

=== Final ===
Rank	Athlete	Time	Pen.	Total
1st place, gold medalist(s)	Zou Yingying (CHN)	105.72	0	105.72
2nd place, silver medalist(s)	Li Jingjing (CHN)	106.37	0	106.37
3rd place, bronze medalist(s)	Asahi Yamada (JPN)	111.99	2	113.99
4	Yekaterina Lukicheva (KAZ)	114.76	6	120.76
5	Chang Chu-han (TPE)	119.23	6	125.23
6	Anya Suppermpool (THA)	154.86	8	162.86
