= 2011 Asian Canoe Sprint Championships =

Canoeing competition in Tehran, Iran

- Host city: Tehran, Iran
- Dates: 13–16 October 2011
- Main venue: Azadi Lake

The 2011 Asian Canoe Sprint Championships were the 14th Asian Canoe Sprint Championships and took place from October 13–16, 2011 in Azadi Lake, Tehran, Iran.

The event is also the continental qualification for the 2012 Summer Olympics in London.

== Medal summary ==
=== Men ===
Event	Gold	Silver	Bronze
C-1 200 m	Li Weijie; China	Alexandr Dyadchuk; Kazakhstan	Naoya Sakamoto; Japan
C-1 500 m	An Hyun-jin; South Korea	Ruslan Muratov; Kazakhstan	Gerasim Kochnev; Uzbekistan
C-1 1000 m	Huang Shaokun; China	Gerasim Kochnev; Uzbekistan	Yevgeniy Safronov; Kazakhstan
C-1 5000 m	Adel Mojallali; Iran	Vladimir Petrov; Kazakhstan	Huang Shaokun; China
C-2 500 m	Uzbekistan; Vadim Menkov; Merey Medetov	Kazakhstan; Sergey Yemelyanov; Timofey Yemelyanov	Iran; Amir Hossein Khodayar; Mohsen Saadatkhah
C-2 1000 m	China; Huang Maoxing; Li Qiang	Kazakhstan; Sergey Yemelyanov; Timofey Yemelyanov	Uzbekistan; Vadim Menkov; Merey Medetov
C-4 1000 m	China; Li Qiang; Huang Maoxing; Li Xueliang; Zhu Jikun	Uzbekistan; Serik Mirbekov; Dilshod Yuldashov; Mirziyodjon Khojiev; Gerasim Kochnev	Kazakhstan; Vladimir Petrov; Ruslan Muratov; Dmitriy Sorokin; Yevgeniy Safronov
K-1 200 m	Zhou Peng; China	Keiji Mizumoto; Japan	Aleksey Mochalov; Uzbekistan
K-1 500 m	Ahmad Reza Talebian; Iran	Zhou Yubo; China	Igor Dorofeev; Kyrgyzstan
K-1 1000 m	Ahmad Reza Talebian; Iran	Zhang Fusheng; China	Yevgeniy Yegorov; Kazakhstan
K-1 5000 m	Ahmad Reza Talebian; Iran	Vyacheslav Gorn; Uzbekistan	Xu Haitao; China
K-2 200 m	Japan; Momotaro Matsushita; Hiroki Watanabe	Kazakhstan; Dmitriy Torlopov; Alexey Dergunov	Uzbekistan; Sergey Borzov; Aleksey Mochalov
K-2 500 m	China; Huang Zhipeng; Shen Jie	Kazakhstan; Yuriy Berezintsev; Stanislav Rzaev	South Korea; Choi Min-kyu; Kang Hyun-gu
K-2 1000 m	Kazakhstan; Alexey Dergunov; Yevgeniy Alexeyev	Uzbekistan; Sergey Borzov; Aleksey Mochalov	Iran; Hamid Reza Torki; Saeid Fazloula
K-4 1000 m	China; Zhou Yubo; Huang Zhipeng; Shen Jie; Xu Haitao	Iran; Arvand Darvish; Farzin Asadi; Milad Ghasemi; Amin Boudaghi	Kyrgyzstan; Maksim Bondar; Aleksandr Parol; Ilia Algin; Igor Dorofeev

=== Women ===
Event	Gold	Silver	Bronze
C-1 200 m	Darya Goncharova; Kazakhstan	Nadia Talanak; Iran	Betty Joseph; India
C-2 500 m	India; Bincymol Babychan; Betty Joseph	Iran; Elaheh Nikoo; Behnoush Akaberi	None awarded
K-1 200 m	Zhou Yu; China	Shinobu Kitamoto; Japan	Yuliya Borzova; Uzbekistan
K-1 500 m	Zhou Yu; China	Asumi Omura; Japan	Yuliya Borzova; Uzbekistan
K-1 1000 m	Liu Haiping; China	Arezoo Motamedi; Iran	Yun Eun-hee; South Korea
K-1 5000 m	Li Zhangli; China	Arezoo Motamedi; Iran	Yun Eun-hee; South Korea
K-2 200 m	China; Wu Yanan; Zhang Hong	Uzbekistan; Ekaterina Shubina; Yuliya Borzova	South Korea; Kim Min-ji; Lee Hye-ran
K-2 500 m	China; Wu Yanan; Ren Wenjun	Japan; Asumi Omura; Shinobu Kitamoto	Uzbekistan; Yuliya Borzova; Ekaterina Shubina
K-2 1000 m	China; Yu Lamei; Ren Wenjun	Iran; Najmeh Sajjadi; Sima Orouji	South Korea; Lee Hye-ran; Lee Min
K-4 500 m	China; Zhou Yu; Wu Yanan; Ren Wenjun; Yu Lamei	Iran; Sima Orouji; Raheleh Mirzaei; Arezoo Motamedi; Najmeh Sajjadi	India; Ragina Kiro; Silpamol Sisupalan; A. Nanao Devi; Naorem Lanjenganbi Chanu

== Medal table ==
Rank	Nation	Gold	Silver	Bronze	Total
1	China	15	2	2	19
2	Iran	4	7	2	13
3	Kazakhstan	2	7	3	12
4	Uzbekistan	1	5	7	13
5	Japan	1	4	1	6
6	South Korea	1	0	5	6
7	India	1	0	2	3
8	Kyrgyzstan	0	0	2	2
Totals (8 entries)		25	25	24	74
