= Kazakhstan at the 2010 Asian Games =

- IOC code: KAZ
- NOC: National Olympic Committee of the Republic of Kazakhstan

in Guangzhou
- Competitors: 365 in 28 sports
- Medals Ranked 5th: Gold 18 Silver 23 Bronze 38 Total 79

Asian Games appearances (overview)
- 1994; 1998; 2002; 2006; 2010; 2014; 2018; 2022; 2026

Kazakhstan participated in the 16th Asian Games in Guangzhou from 12 November to 27 November 2010.

== Medal table ==
Sport	Gold	Silver	Bronze	Total
Athletics	4	4	3	11
Weightlifting	3	2	4	9
Wrestling	2	2	7	11
Boxing	2	2	2	6
Karate	2	0	1	3
Rhythmic Gymnastics	2	0	0	2
Shooting	1	3	2	6
Water Polo	1	1	0	2
Rugby	1	0	0	1
Canoe/Kayak Sprint	0	4	3	7
Judo	0	1	3	4
Fencing	0	1	2	3
Taekwondo	0	1	2	3
Swimming	0	1	1	2
Rowing	0	1	1	2
Artistic Gymnastics	0	0	2	2
Dance Sport	0	0	1	1
Volleyball	0	0	1	1
Synchronised Swimming	0	0	1	1
Modern Pentathlon	0	0	1	1
Triathlon	0	0	1	1
Total	18	23	38	79

== Medalists ==
Medal	Name	Sport	Event	Date
Gold	Daniyar Yeleussinov	Boxing	Men's 64kg	26 Nov
Gold	Yelena Shalygina	Wrestling	Women's Freestyle 63 kg	26 Nov
Gold	Anna Alyabyeva	Rhythmic Gymnastics	Individual	26 Nov
Gold	Serik Sapiyev	Boxing	Men's 69kg	25 Nov
Gold	Kazakhstan	Water polo	Men's	25 Nov
Gold	Kazakhstan	Rhythmic Gymnastics	Team	25 Nov
Gold	Rinat Sagandykov	Karate	Men's -67 kg	25 Nov
Gold	Darkhan Assadilov	Karate	Men's -60 kg	25 Nov
Gold	Dmitriy Karpov	Athletics	Men's Decathlon	25 Nov
Gold	Olga Rypakova	Athletics	Women's Triple Jump	25 Nov
Gold	Margarita Matsko	Athletics	Women's 800m	25 Nov
Gold	Kazakhstan	Rugby	Women's	23 Nov
Gold	Nurmakhan Tinaliyev	Wrestling	Men's Greco-Roman 120 kg	23 Nov
Gold	Olga Tereshkova	Athletics	Women's 400m	22 Nov
Gold	Svetlana Podobedova	Weightlifting	Women's 75 kg	18 Nov
Gold	Ilya Ilyin	Weightlifting	Men's 94 kg	18 Nov
Gold	Maiya Maneza	Weightlifting	Women's 63 kg	16 Nov
Gold	Kazakhstan	Shooting	Women's 25m Pistol Team	16 Nov
Silver	Birzhan Zhakypov	Boxing	Men's 49kg	26 Nov
Silver	Kazakhstan	Athletics	Women's 4 x 400m Relay	26 Nov
Silver	Yevgeniy Ektov	Athletics	Men's Triple Jump	26 Nov
Silver	Alexandr Dyadchuk	Canoe/Kayak Sprint	Men's Canoe Single 200m	26 Nov
Silver	Natalya Sergeyeva	Canoe/Kayak Sprint	Women's Kayak Single 500m	26 Nov
Silver	Ivan Dychko	Boxing	Men's +91kg	25 Nov
Silver	Natalya Ivoninskaya	Athletics	100 metres hurdles	25 Nov
Silver	Kazakhstan	Canoe/Kayak Sprint	Men's Kayak Four 1000m	25 Nov
Silver	Kazakhstan	Canoe/Kayak Sprint	Men's Kayak Double 1000m	25 Nov
Silver	Olga Rypakova	Athletics	Women's Long Jump	23 Nov
Silver	Asset Mambetov	Wrestling	Men's Greco-Roman 96 kg	22 Nov
Silver	Kazakhstan	Fencing	Men's Team Épée	21 Nov
Silver	Darkhan Bayakhmetov	Wrestling	Men's Greco-Roman 66 kg	21 Nov
Silver	Feruza Yergeshova	Taekwondo	Women's Under 73kg	20 Nov
Silver	Oxana Nazarova | Svetlana Germanovich	Rowing	Women's Pair	19 Nov
Silver	Kazakhstan	Shooting	Men's 50m Rifle 3 Positions Team	18 Nov
Silver	Kazakhstan	Water polo	Women's	17 Nov
Silver	Kirill Pavlov	Weightlifting	Men's 77 kg	16 Nov
Silver	Vladislav Polyakov	Swimming	Men's 100m Breaststroke	15 Nov
Silver	Yuriy Melsitov	Shooting	Men's 50m Rifle Prone	15 Nov
Silver	Olga Dovgun	Shooting	Women's 50m Rifle Prone	15 Nov
Silver	Islam Bozbayev	Judo	Men's 81kg	14 Nov
Silver	Zulfiya Chinshanlo	Weightlifting	Women's 53kg	14 Nov
Bronze	Maxim Rakov	Judo	Men's 100kg	13 Nov
Bronze	Galiya Ulmentayeva	Judo	Women's 78kg	13 Nov
Bronze	Gulzhan Issanova	Judo	Women's +78kg	13 Nov
Bronze	Dmitriy Gaag	Triathlon	Men's individual	14 Nov
Bronze	Amanda Batkalova | Timur Namazbayev	Dancesport	Standard Five Dances Competition	14 Nov
Bronze	Kazakhstan	Shooting	Men's 50m Rifle Prone team	15 Nov
Bronze	Kazakhstan	Shooting	Men's 10m Running Target Team	16 Nov
Bronze	Dauren Shauyeteyev	Weightlifting	Men's 77 kg	16 Nov
Bronze	Stanislav Valiyev	Gymnastics	Vault	17 Nov
Bronze	Ildar Valeyev	Gymnastics	Parallel bars	17 Nov
Bronze	Tatyana Khromova	Weightlifting	Women's 75 kg	18 Nov
Bronze	Arman Chilmanov	Taekwondo	Men's +87 kg	18 Nov
Bronze	Kazakhstan	Swimming	Men's 4 x 100m Medley Relay	18 Nov
Bronze	Kazakhstan	Rowing	Women's Four	18 Nov
Bronze	Sergey Istomin	Weightlifting	Men's 105 kg	19 Nov
Bronze	Gulnafis Aitmukhambetova	Taekwondo	Women's Under 67kg	19 Nov
Bronze	Mariya Grabovetskaya	Weightlifting	Women's +75 kg	19 Nov
Bronze	Marat Karishalov	Wrestling	Men's Greco-Roman 55 kg	21 Nov
Bronze	Kazakhstan	Fencing	Women's Team Sabre	21 Nov
Bronze	Kazakhstan	Synchronized swimming	Combination	21 Nov
Bronze	Marina Maslyonko	Athletics	Women's 400m	22 Nov
Bronze	Kazakhstan	Fencing	Men's Team Sabre	22 Nov
Bronze	Alkhazur Ozdiyev	Wrestling	Men's Greco-Roman 84 kg	22 Nov
Bronze	Dauren Zhumagaziyev	Wrestling	Men's Freestyle 60 kg	23 Nov
Bronze	Vitaliy Tsykunov	Athletics	Men's High Jump	23 Nov
Bronze	Kazakhstan	Modern pentathlon	Women´s Team	23 Nov
Bronze	Saida Khassenova	Boxing	Women's 57-60kg	24 Nov
Bronze	Danabek Suzhanov	Boxing	Men's 75kg	24 Nov
Bronze	Khalid Khalidov	Karate	Men's +84 kg	24 Nov
Bronze	Leonid Spiridonov	Wrestling	Men's Freestyle 66 kg	24 Nov
Bronze	Yermek Baiduashov	Wrestling	Men's Freestyle 84 kg	24 Nov
Bronze	Kazakhstan	Canoe/Kayak Sprint	Men's Canoe Double 1000m	25 Nov
Bronze	Natalya Sergeyeva	Canoe/Kayak Sprint	Women's Kayak Single 200m	26 Nov
Bronze	Kazakhstan	Canoe/Kayak Sprint	Women's Kayak Double 500m	26 Nov
Bronze	Anna Ustinova	Athletics	Women's High Jump	26 Nov
Bronze	Aiym Abdildina	Wrestling	Women's Freestyle 55 kg	26 Nov
Bronze	Guzel Manyurova	Wrestling	Women's Freestyle 72 kg	26 Nov
Bronze	Kazakhstan	Volleyball	Women's	27 Nov

== Archery ==
=== Men ===
Athlete	Event	Ranking Round		Round of 64	Round of 32	Round of 16	Quarterfinals	Semifinals	Final
Athlete	Event	Score	Seed	Opposition Score	Opposition Score	Opposition Score	Opposition Score	Opposition Score	Opposition Score
Konstantin Kim	Individual	1276	35th Q	BYE	Kuo Cheng-wei (TPE); L 3-4 (46-56, 53-53, 54-53, 9-9)	did not advance			
Oibek Saidiyev	Individual	1285	30th Q	BYE	Milad Vaziri (IRI); W 5-1 (56-55, 54-54, 55-53)	Xing Yu (CHN); L 0-6 (23-26, 26-29, 27-28)	did not advance		
Artyom Gankin	Individual	1232	48th	did not advance					
Konstantin Kim; Oibek Saidiyev; Artyom Gankin	Team	3793	11th Q			Chinese Taipei (TPE); L 214^{42}-214^{56}	did not advance		

=== Women ===
Athlete	Event	Ranking Round		Round of 32	Round of 16	Quarterfinals	Semifinals	Final
Athlete	Event	Score	Seed	Opposition Score	Opposition Score	Opposition Score	Opposition Score	Opposition Score
Farida Tukebayeva	Individual	1323	10th Q	Mathui Prue Marma (BAN); W 4-0 (54-46, 55-49)	Zhang Yunlu (CHN); W 7-1 (28-27, 28-28, 28-27, 28-27)	Yun Ok-Hee (KOR); L 3-7 (28-26, 28-29, 28-28, 27-29, 27-29)	did not advance	
Olga Pilipova	Individual	1287	25th	did not advance				
Yelena Li	Individual	1263	31st	did not advance				
Anastassiya Bannova	Individual	1254	34th Q	Choe Song-Hui (PRK); L 2-4 (52-54, 56-54, 46-50)	did not advance			
Anastassiya Bannova; Olga Pilipova; Farida Tukebayeva	Team	3864	6th Q		Tajikistan (TJK); W 207-187	China (CHN); L 200-214	did not advance	

== Athletics ==
=== Men ===
Track events

Event	Athletes	Heat Round 1		Semifinal		Final	
Event	Athletes	Result	Rank	Result	Rank	Result	Rank
200 m	Vyacheslav Muravyev	21.47	6th			did not advance	
1500 m	Artem Kossinov	3:47.07	6th QF			3:44.77 SB	8th
400 m hurdles	Viktor Leptikov	51.63	3rd QF			52.45	5th
400 m hurdles	Yevgeniy Meleshenko	51.67 SB	4th QF			51.34 SB	4th

Field events

Event	Athletes	Qualification		Final	
Event	Athletes	Result	Rank	Result	Rank
High Jump	Vitaliy Tsykunov	2.15 m.	1st QF	2.19 m. SB	3rd place, bronze medalist(s)
High Jump	Sergey Zassimovich	2.05 m.	8th	did not advance	
Long Jump	Konstantin Safronov			7.41 m.	8th
Triple Jump	Yevgeniy Ektov			16.86 m. SB	2nd place, silver medalist(s)
Triple Jump	Roman Valiyev			16.51 m.	6th

Combined events

Decathlon
Event	Dmitriy Karpov		
Event	Results	Points	Rank
100 m	10.92	878	4th
Long jump	7.14 m.	847	4th
Shot put	16.95 m.	910	1st
High jump	2.03 m.	831	2nd
400 m	50.79	779	4th
110 m hurdles	15.03	846	4th
Discus throw	48.61 m.	841	1st
Pole vault	4.90 m.	880	1st
Javelin throw	53.62 m.	642	5th
1500 m	4:57.80	572	4th
Final Total		8026	1st place, gold medalist(s)

=== Women ===
Track events

Event	Athletes	Heat Round 1		Semifinal		Final	
Event	Athletes	Result	Rank	Result	Rank	Result	Rank
100 m	Viktoriya Zyabkina	12.07	5th	did not advance			
100 m	Olga Bludova	11.93	2nd QS	11.87 SB	5th QF	did not advance	
400 m	Olga Tereshkova	53.52 SB	1st QF			51.97 SB	1st place, gold medalist(s)
400 m	Marina Maslyonko	52.35 SB	1st QF			52.70	3rd place, bronze medalist(s)
800 m	Margarita Matsko	2:03.23	1st QF			2:00.29 PB	1st place, gold medalist(s)
800 m	Viktoriya Yalovtseva	2:04.27 SB	3rd			did not advance	
100 m hurdles	Natalya Ivoninskaya	13.22 SB	2nd QF			13.24	2nd place, silver medalist(s)
100 m hurdles	Anastassiya Soprunova	13.22 PB	3rd QF			13.28	4th
4x100 m relay	Olga Bludova; Natalya Ivoninskaya; Anastassiya Soprunova; Viktoriya Zyabkina	DNF				did not advance	
4x400 m relay	Marina Maslyonko; Viktoriya Yalovtseva; Margarita Matsko; Olga Tereshkova					3:30.03 NR	2nd place, silver medalist(s)

Field events

Event	Athletes	Final	
Event	Athletes	Result	Rank
High jump	Anna Ustinova	1.90 m.	3rd place, bronze medalist(s)
Long jump	Olga Rypakova	6.50 m. SB	2nd place, silver medalist(s)
Long jump	Tatyana Konichsheva	5.53 m.	14th
Triple jump	Olga Rypakova	14.78 m.	1st place, gold medalist(s)

== Beach volleyball ==
=== Men ===
Athlete	Event	Preliminary Round			Round of 16	Quarterfinals	Semifinals	Finals
Athlete	Event	Opposition Score	Opposition Score	Opposition Score	Opposition Score	Opposition Score	Opposition Score	Opposition Score
Alexey Kuleshov; Dmitriy Yakovlev	Men's beach volleyball	Kasi Viswanatha Raju (IND) and Kiran Kumar Reddy (IND); W 2-1 (21-12, 20-22, 17-15)	Nget Sothearith (CAM) and Mon Rom (CAM); W 2-0 (21-14, 21-12)	Rafi Asruki Nordin (MAS) and Khoo Chong Long (MAS); W 2-1 (19-21, 23-21, 15-9)	Dian Putra Santoso (INA) and Ade Candra Rachmawan (INA); W 2-0 (21-16, 21-17)	Parviz Farrokhi (IRI) and Aghmohammad Salagh (IRI); W 2-0 (21-18, 21-13)	Wu Penggen (CHN) and Xu Linyin (CHN); L 0-2 (10-21, 12-21)	Bronze medal match: Kentaro Asahi (JPN) and Katsuhiro Shiratori (JPN); L 0-2 (14-21, 10-21)
Alexey Sidorenko; Alexandr Dyachenko	Men's beach volleyball	An Tae-Young (KOR) and Kwon Yong-Seok (KOR); W 2-0 (21-10, 21-9)	Wong Chun Wai (HKG) and Wong Kwun Pong (HKG); W 2-0 (21-11, 21-8)		Asanka Pradeep Kumara (SRI) and Pubudu Ekanayaka (SRI); W 2-0 (21-11, 21-4)	Gao Peng (CHN) and Li Jian (CHN); L 1-2 (26-24, 15-21, 13-15)	did not advance	

=== Women ===
Athlete	Event	Preliminary Round			Round of 16	Quarterfinals	Semifinals	Finals
Athlete	Event	Opposition Score	Opposition Score	Opposition Score	Opposition Score	Opposition Score	Opposition Score	Opposition Score
Lyudmila Issayeva; Inna Rakhmatulina	Women's beach volleyball	Xue Chen (CHN) and Zhang Xi (CHN); L 0-2 (10-21, 12-21)	Tse Wing Hung (HKG) and Kong Cheuk Yee (HKG); W 2-0 (21-19, 21-12)	Lee Hyun-Jung (KOR) and Lee Eun-A (KOR); W 2-0 (21-17, 21-14)	Kamoltip Kulna (THA) and Yupa Phokongploy (THA); L 0-2 (12-21, 17-21)	did not advance		
Tatyana Mashkova; Irina Tsimbalova	Women's beach volleyball	Lee Sun-Hwa (KOR) and Kwak Mi-Jung (KOR); W 2-0 (21-8, 21-6)	Usa Tenpaksee (THA) and Jarunee Sannok (THA); L 1-2 (16-21, 21-18, 15-12)	Geethika Gunawardena (SRI) and Sujeewa Wijesinghe (SRI); W 2-0 (21-12, 21-13)	Beh Shun Thing (MAS) and Luk Teck Hua (MAS); L 0-2 (19-21, 15-21)	did not advance		

== Boxing ==
Athlete	Event	Round of 32	Round of 16	Quarterfinals	Semifinals	Final
Athlete	Event	Opposition Result	Opposition Result	Opposition Result	Opposition Result	Opposition Result
Birzhan Zhakypov	Men's Light Flyweight	BYE	Pürevdorjiin Serdamba (MGL); W 9-0	Shin Jong-Hun (KOR); W 17-3	Victorio Saludar (PHI); W 12-1	Zou Shiming (CHN); L 5-9 (silver)
Miras Zhakupov	Men's Flyweight	Kim Ju-Seong (KOR); L 3-5	did not advance			
Daniyar Tulegenov	Men's Bantamweight	Charly Suarez (PHI); W 7-1	Sigyel Phub (BHU); L 3-6	did not advance		
Samat Bashenov	Men's Lightweight	BYE	Mahmoud Eshaish (JOR); W 8-3	Han Soon-Chul (KOR); L 8-11	did not advance	
Daniyar Yeleussinov	Men's Light welterweight	BYE	Mohammad Maroof Islam (AFG); W RSCI R1 1:26	Houman Karami (IRI); W 12-0	Sanjarbek Rahmonov (UZB); W 6-0	V. Santhosh Kumar (IND); W 16-1 (gold)
Serik Sapiyev	Men's Welterweight	Huzam Nabaah (QAT); W RSCO R2 3:00	Mohd Farkhan Haron (MAS); W RSC R2 2:30	Chang Wei-jen (TPE); W WO	Jargalyn Otgonjargal (MGL); W 10-5	Uktamjon Rahmonov (UZB); W 9-3 (gold)
Danabek Suzhanov	Men's Middleweight	BYE	Sobhi Sukkari (PLE); W RSC R3 0:25	Asadullo Boimurodov (KGZ); W 9-3	Abbos Atoev (UZB); L 5-9 (bronze)	did not advance
Almat Serimov	Men's Light Heavyweight		Elshod Rasulov (UZB); L 2-5	did not advance		
Vassiliy Levit	Men's Heavyweight		Mohammad Ghossoun (SYR); L 6-11	did not advance		
Ivan Dychko	Men's Super Heavyweight		BYE	Sardor Abdullaev (UZB); W 8-1	Rouhollah Hosseini (IRI); W 6-4	Zhang Zhilei (CHN); L 5-7 (silver)
Zhaina Shekerbekova	Women's Flyweight		Annie Albania (PHI); L 2-9	did not advance		
Saida Khassenova	Women's Lightweight		Mavzuna Chorieva (TJK); W 10-4	Hsueh Chun-chiu (TPE); W 9-2	Tassamalee Thongjan (THA); L 3-8 (bronze)	did not advance
Marina Volnova	Women's Middleweight			Kavita Goyat (IND); L 7-8	did not advance	

== Board games ==
=== Chess ===
Athlete	Event	Round 1	Round 2	Round 3	Round 4	Round 5	Round 6	Round 7	Round 8	Round 9	Win	Draw	Lost	Points	Rank
Athlete	Event	Opposition Result	Opposition Result	Opposition Result	Opposition Result	Opposition Result	Opposition Result	Opposition Result	Opposition Result	Opposition Result	Win	Draw	Lost	Points	Rank
Murtas Kazhgaleyev	Men's Individual Rapid	Ahmed Abdul-Sattar (IRQ); W	Basheer Al-Qudaimi (YEM); W	Lê Quang Liêm (VIE); L	Salem Saleh (UAE); W	Wesley So (PHI); D	Bu Xiangzhi (CHN); L	Abdullah Hassan (UAE); W	Ni Hua (CHN); W	Surya Shekhar Ganguly (IND); W	6	1	2	6.5	4th
Darmen Sadvakasov	Men's Individual Rapid	Shinya Kojima (JPN); W	Bayarsaikhan Gundavaa (MGL); W	Surya Shekhar Ganguly (IND); L	Namkhai Battulga (MGL); W	Ehsan Ghaemmaghami (IRI); W	Lê Quang Liêm (VIE); D	Anton Filippov (UZB); L	Nguyen Ngoc Truong Son (VIE); W	Rustam Kasimdzhanov (UZB); D	5	2	2	6.0	6th
Gulmira Dauletova	Women's Individual Rapid	Salama Al-Khelaifi (QAT); W	Tania Sachdev (IND); L	Noura Mohamed Saleh (UAE); W	Dronavalli Harika (IND); L	Kholoud Al-Zarouni (UAE); W	Nodira Nodirjanova (UZB); W	Tövshintögsiin Batchimeg (MGL); L	Altanulziigiin Enkhtuul (MGL); L	Atousa Pourkashiyan (IRI); D	4	1	4	4.5	18th
Guliskhan Nakhbayeva	Women's Individual Rapid	Kim Hyo-Young (KOR); W	Atousa Pourkashiyan (IRI); W	Tania Sachdev (IND); L	Zhu Chen (QAT); L	Narumi Uchida (JPN); W	Hoang Thi Bao Tram (VIE); L	Sharmin Sultana Shirin (IRQ); W	Shadi Paridar (IRI); L	Nur Nabila Azman Hisham (MAS); W	5	0	4	5.0	15th

Athlete	Event	Round 1	Round 2	Round 3	Round 4	Round 5	Round 6	Round 7	Points	Rank	Semifinal	Final
Athlete	Event	Opposition Result	Opposition Result	Opposition Result	Opposition Result	Opposition Result	Opposition Result	Opposition Result	Points	Rank	Opposition Result	Opposition Result
Murtas Kazhgaleyev; Darmen Sadvakasov; Rinat Jumabayev; Rustam Khusnutdinov; Yevgeniy Vladimirov	Men's Team Classical	Yemen (YEM); 3.0-1.0	Qatar (QAT); 2.5-1.5	India (IND); 1.5-2.5	Philippines (PHI); 1.5-2.5	Uzbekistan (UZB); 2.0-2.0	Vietnam (VIE); 2.0-2.0	China (CHN); 1.5-2.5	6.0	11th	did not advance	

== Canoeing ==
=== Canoe-Kayak Flatwater ===
Men

Athlete	Event	Heats		Semifinals		Final	
Athlete	Event	Time	Rank	Time	Rank	Time	Rank
Alexandr Dyadchuk	C-1 200 m	42.807	2nd QF	auto advancement		41.056	2nd place, silver medalist(s)
Ruslan Muratov	C-1 1000 m	4:02.529	3rd QF	auto advancement		4:03.216	4th
Mikhail Yemelyanov; Timofey Yemelyanov	C-2 1000 m					3:41.399	3rd place, bronze medalist(s)
Dmitriy Torlopov	K-1 200 m	38.187	2nd QF	auto advancement		37.611	4th
Yegor Sergeyev	K-1 1000 m	3:50.894	3rd QF	auto advancement		3:48.197	6th
Alexey Dergunov; Yevgeniy Yegorov	K-2 200 m	35.187	2nd QF	auto advancement		33.853	4th
Alexandr Yemelyanov; Alexey Dergunov	K-2 1000 m	3:18.967	2nd QF	auto advancement		3:16.195	2nd place, silver medalist(s)
Alexandr Yemelyanov; Yevgeniy Alexeyev; Dmitriy Torpolov; Yevgeniy Yegorov	K-4 1000 m	2:58.610	1st QF	auto advancement		2:58.795	2nd place, silver medalist(s)

Women

Athlete	Event	Heats		Semifinals		Final	
Athlete	Event	Time	Rank	Time	Rank	Time	Rank
Natalya Sergeyeva	K-1 200 m	43.286	2nd QF	auto advancement		42.220	3rd place, bronze medalist(s)
Natalya Sergeyeva	K-1 500 m	1:51.965	2nd QF	auto advancement		1:50.393	2nd place, silver medalist(s)
Yelena Podoinikova; Irina Podoinikova	K-2 500 m	1:48.879	2nd QF	auto advancement		1:49.577	3rd place, bronze medalist(s)
Yelena Podoinikova; Irina Podoinikova; Olga Ponomaryova; Olga Shmelyova	K-4 500 m					1:39.703	4th

=== Canoe-Kayak Slalom ===
Men

Athlete	Event	Preliminary				Semifinal		Final	
Athlete	Event	Run 1	Run 2	Total	Rank	Time	Rank	Time	Rank
Rafail Vergoyazov	C-1	116.59	123.25	239.84	5th	124.53	6th	118.98	5th

Women

Athlete	Event	Preliminary				Semifinal		Final	
Athlete	Event	Run 1	Run 2	Total	Rank	Time	Rank	Time	Rank
Yekaterina Lukicheva	K-1	220.55	104.02	324.57	5th	182.83	5th	120.76	4th

== Cycling ==
=== Road ===
Men

Athlete	Event	Time	Rank
Maxim Iglinsky	Road race	4:14:54	6th
Valentin Iglinsky	Road race	DNF	
Andrey Mizurov	Time trial	1:09:24.89	6th

Women

Athlete	Event	Time	Rank
Natalya Stefanskaya	Road race	2:47:46	4th
Yelena Antonova	Road race	2:47:46	21st
Yelena Antonova	Time trial	54:05.66	6th

=== Track ===
Pursuits

Athlete	Event	Qualifying		1st round		Finals	
Athlete	Event	Time	Rank	Opposition Time	Rank	Opposition Time	Rank
Berik Kupeshov	Men's individual pursuit	4:44.538	14th	did not advance			
Andrey Kashechkin	Men's individual pursuit	4:47.520	16th	did not advance			
Yelena Antonova	Women's individual pursuit	4:17.074	16th	did not advance			
Alexey Lyalko; Andrey Kashechkin; Nikolay Ivanov; Oleg Kashechkin; Sergey Kuzin	Men's team pursuit	4:23.372	8th Q	Hong Kong; L Overlapped	2nd	did not advance	

Points races

Athlete	Event	Qualifying		Final	
Athlete	Event	Points	Rank	Points	Rank
Evgeniy Sladkov	Men's points race	2	9th Q	0	16th
Alexey Lyalko	Men's points race	11	8th Q	56	4th

== Dancesport ==
Standard dance

Athlete	Event	Quarterfinal		Semifinal		Final	
Athlete	Event	Points	Rank	Points	Rank	Points	Rank
Almat Kambarov; Aktoty Zhappasbayeva	Waltz	7.00	5th S	5.00	5th F	35.71	5th
Almat Kambarov; Aktoty Zhappasbayeva	Slow Foxtrot	6.00	6th S	4.00	4th F	35.64	4th
Yevgeniy Plokhikh; Yelena Klyuchnikova	Tango	8.00	3rd S	8.00	3rd F	36.00	4th
Yevgeniy Plokhikh; Yelena Klyuchnikova	Quickstep	9.00	1st S	8.00	3rd F	36.36	4th
Timur Namazbayev; Amanda Batkalova	Five Dances			41.00	5th F	187.50	3rd place, bronze medalist(s)

Latin dance

Athlete	Event	Quarterfinal		Semifinal		Final	
Athlete	Event	Points	Rank	Points	Rank	Points	Rank
Abylaikhan Akkubekov; Veronika Popova	Samba	5.00	7th S	7.00	5th F	36.79	4th
Abylaikhan Akkubekov; Veronika Popova	Paso doble	3.00	7th S	3.00	6th F	35.29	6th
Artur Sabitov; Kristina Grigoryan	Cha-cha-cha	4.00	7th S	5.00	5th F	35.93	5th
Artur Sabitov; Kristina Grigoryan	Jive	5.00	6th S	4.00	6th F	36.00	4th
Akhmet Kalmatayev; Khristina Ivolgina	Five Dances	41.00	3rd S	38.00	3rd F	193.07	4th

== Equestrian ==
=== Eventing ===
Athlete	Horse	Event	Dressage		Cross-country			Jumping					
Athlete	Horse	Event	Dressage		Cross-country			1st Jumping			Final Jumping		
Athlete	Horse	Event	Penalties	Rank	Penalties	Total	Rank	Penalties	Total	Rank	Penalties	Total	Rank
Alena Bobrovskaya	Carry Bredshow	Individual	47.90	8th	0.00	47.90	8th	4.00	51.90	8th	12.00	63.90	9th
Pavel Sergeyev	Balzam	Individual	57.30	18th	0.00	57.30	16th	0.00	57.30	14th	13.00	70.30	11th
Vladimir Chekalin	Hellani	Individual	61.50	25th	0.00	61.50	21st	did not advance					
Valeriy Chekalin	Arhond	Individual	63.50	28th	RT			did not advance					
Alena Bobrovskaya; Pavel Sergeyev; Vladimir Chekalin; Valeriy Chekalin	as above	Team	166.70	6th	0.00	166.70	6th	8.00	174.70	6th			

== Fencing ==
=== Men ===
Event	Athlete	Round of Poules		Round of 32	Round of 16	Quarterfinals	Semifinals	Final
Event	Athlete	Result	Seed	Opposition Score	Opposition Score	Opposition Score	Opposition Score	Opposition Score
Alexandr Axenov	Individual épée	3 W - 2 L	10th Q	Shogo Nishida (JPN); L 9-15	did not advance			
Elmir Alimzhanov	Individual épée	5 W - 0 L	2nd Q	BYE	Ali Yaghoubian (IRI); W 15-7	Shogo Nishida (JPN); L 11-15	Did not advance	
Elmir Alimzhanov; Aleksandr Axenov; Dmitriy Gryaznov; Sergey Shabalin	Team épée				India; W 45-35	Kyrgyzstan; W 45-42	China; W 45-40	South Korea; L 31-45 (silver)
Zhanserik Turlybekov	Individual sabre	3 W - 2 L	9th Q	BYE	Yevgeniy Frolov (KAZ); W 15-10	Gu Bon-Gil (KOR); L 4-15	did not advance	
Yevgeniy Frolov	Individual sabre	3 W - 1 L	8th Q	BYE	Zhanserik Turlybekov (KAZ); L 10-15	did not advance		
Yevgeniy Frolov; Yerali Tilenshiyev; Zhanserik Turlybekov	Team sabre					Iran; W 45-28	South Korea; L 33-45 (bronze)	did not advance

=== Women ===
Event	Athlete	Round of Poules		Round of 16	Quarterfinals	Semifinals	Final
Event	Athlete	Result	Seed	Opposition Score	Opposition Score	Opposition Score	Opposition Score
Oxana Svatkovskaya	Individual épée	3 W - 3 L	11th Q	Nozomi Nakano (JPN); L 12-15	did not advance		
Jamiliya Yunusbayeva	Individual épée	2 W - 3 L	12th Q	Luo Xiaojuan (CHN); L 8-15	did not advance		
Oxana Svatkovskaya; Jamiliya Yunusbayeva; Karina Rakhmetova	Team épée			BYE	Hong Kong; L 22-25	did not advance	
Yuliya Zhivitsa	Individual sabre	3 W - 2 L	9th q	Au Yeung Wai Sum (HKG); L 14-15	did not advance		
Tamara Pochekutova	Individual sabre	3 W - 2 L	7th Q	Chizuru Oginezawa (JPN); W 15-14	Tan Xue (CHN); L 6-15	did not advance	
Tamara Pochekutova; Yuliya Zhivitsa; A Bekturganova; Anastassiya Gimatdinova	Team sabre				Singapore; W 45-35	South Korea; L 29-25 (bronze)	did not advance

== Gymnastics ==
=== Artistic gymnastics ===
Men
Individual Qualification & Team all-around Final

Athlete	Apparatus						Individual All-around		Team	
Athlete	Floor	Pommel horse	Rings	Vault	Parallel bars	Horizontal bar	Total	Rank	Total	Rank
Stepan Gorbachev	14.250	13.050	14.000	15.750	14.500	14.450 Q	86.000 Q	10th		
Timur Kurbanbayev			15.250 Q	14.800		11.900	41.950	68th		
Maxim Petrishko	13.900	13.600			12.300		39.800	74th		
Ildar Valeyev		13.750	14.750		15.400 Q	14.400	58.300	50th		
Stanislav Valiyev	14.000	13.200	14.100	16.400 Q	12.700		70.400	37th		
Yernar Yerimbetov	14.100	13.850	13.450	16.400 Q	13.950	14.300 Q	86.050	9th		
Team Total	56.250	54.400	58.100	63.350	56.550	55.050			343.700	4th

Individual

Athlete	Event	Final							
Athlete	Event	Floor	Pommel Horse	Rings	Vault	Parallel Bars	Horizontal Bar	Total	Rank
Stepan Gorbachev	Individual all-around	13.950	13.650	14.050	15.550	14.600	14.100	85.900	7th
Stepan Gorbachev	Horizontal Bar						13.325	13.325	8th
Timur Kurbanbayev	Rings			14.900				14.900	6th
Stanislav Valiyev	Vault				15.800			15.800	3rd place, bronze medalist(s)
Yernar Yerimbetov	Vault				15.525			15.525	4th
Yernar Yerimbetov	Horizontal Bar						14.775	14.775	5th
Ildar Valeyev	Parallel Bars					15.300		15.300	3rd place, bronze medalist(s)

=== Rhythmic gymnastics ===
Individual Qualification & Team all-around Final

Athlete	Apparatus				Individual All-around		Team	
Athlete	Rope	Hoop	Ball	Ribbon	Total	Rank		
Anna Alyabyeva	28.450	28.650	28.000	28.150	85.250 Q	1st		
Mizana Ismailova	25.100	25.600	25.800		76.500	10th		
Madina Mukanova			24.350		24.350	30th		
Marina Petrakova	26.600	26.750	26.600	26.450	79.950 Q	3rd		
Team Total	80.150	81.000	80.400	78.950			271.050	1st place, gold medalist(s)

Individual all-around

Athlete	Final					
Athlete	Rope	Hoop	Clubs	Ribbon	Total	Rank
Anna Alyabyeva	28.450	28.650	28.200	26.150	111.450	1st place, gold medalist(s)
Marina Petrakova	26.700	26.750	26.850	26.700	107.000	4th

=== Trampoline ===
Men

Athlete	Event	Qualification		Final	
Athlete	Event	Score	Rank	Score	Rank
Yernur Syzdyk	Individual	39.20	7th Q	37.10	5th

== Handball ==
=== Women ===
Team

Assem Batyrbekova
Gulzira Iskakova
Tatyana Konstantinova
Yelena Kozlova
Natalya Kubrina
Natalya Kulakova
Kristina Nedopekina
Yevgeniya Nikolayeva
Tatyana Perfenova
Marina Pikalova
Yelena Portova
Dina Sashurkova
Yelena Suyazova
Natalya Yakovleva
Olga Yegunova
Yevgeniya Zhulkina

Preliminary round

Group A

Pos	Team	Pld	W	D	L	GF	GA	GD	Pts	Qualification
1	South Korea	4	4	0	0	145	65	+80	8	Semifinals
2	Kazakhstan	4	3	0	1	115	71	+44	6	Semifinals
3	Chinese Taipei	4	2	0	2	116	98	+18	4	Placement 5th–6th
4	Thailand	4	1	0	3	78	108	−30	2	Placement 7th–8th
5	Qatar	4	0	0	4	49	161	−112	0	

Source: Results

November 19; 20:45	Kazakhstan	25 – 14	Thailand	Guanggong Gymnasium, Guangzhou; Referees: Mousavian, Taghavi (IRI)
November 19; 20:45	Zhulkina 5	(16–4)	Phonsen, Suphasanan 4	Guanggong Gymnasium, Guangzhou; Referees: Mousavian, Taghavi (IRI)
November 19; 20:45	2× (yellow card) 3× (suspension)	Report	4× (yellow card) 5× (suspension)	Guanggong Gymnasium, Guangzhou; Referees: Mousavian, Taghavi (IRI)

November 20; 20:45	Kazakhstan	43 – 9	Qatar	Guanggong Gymnasium, Guangzhou; Referees: Li, Wang (CHN)
November 20; 20:45	Iskakova 10	(19–4)	Khalfan 4	Guanggong Gymnasium, Guangzhou; Referees: Li, Wang (CHN)
November 20; 20:45	2× (yellow card) 3× (suspension)	Report	3× (yellow card) 2× (suspension)	Guanggong Gymnasium, Guangzhou; Referees: Li, Wang (CHN)

November 22; 19:00	Kazakhstan	30 – 23	Chinese Taipei	Guanggong Gymnasium, Guangzhou; Referees: Al-Mutawa, Al-Suwailam (KUW)
November 22; 19:00	Nedopekina 8	(13–9)	Chu C.E. 8	Guanggong Gymnasium, Guangzhou; Referees: Al-Mutawa, Al-Suwailam (KUW)
November 22; 19:00	3× (yellow card) 2× (suspension)	Report	3× (yellow card) 4× (suspension)	Guanggong Gymnasium, Guangzhou; Referees: Al-Mutawa, Al-Suwailam (KUW)

November 23; 19:00	South Korea	25 – 17	Kazakhstan	Guanggong Gymnasium, Guangzhou; Referees: Karbaschi, Kolahdouzan (IRI)
November 23; 19:00	Ryu E.H., Moon P.H. 8	(13–6)	Nedopekina 4	Guanggong Gymnasium, Guangzhou; Referees: Karbaschi, Kolahdouzan (IRI)
November 23; 19:00	3× (yellow card) 5× (suspension)	Report	3× (yellow card) 4× (suspension)	Guanggong Gymnasium, Guangzhou; Referees: Karbaschi, Kolahdouzan (IRI)

Semifinals

November 25; 14:15	China	24 – 18	Kazakhstan	Guanggong Gymnasium, Guangzhou; Referees: Al-Marzouqi, Al-Nuaimi (UAE)
November 25; 14:15	Li W.W. 5	(11–10)	Pikalova 5	Guanggong Gymnasium, Guangzhou; Referees: Al-Marzouqi, Al-Nuaimi (UAE)
November 25; 14:15	1× (yellow card) 5× (suspension)	Report	2× (yellow card) 2× (suspension)	Guanggong Gymnasium, Guangzhou; Referees: Al-Marzouqi, Al-Nuaimi (UAE)

Bronze medal match

November 26; 12:00	South Korea	38 – 26	Kazakhstan	Guanggong Gymnasium, Guangzhou; Referees: Liu, Liu (CHN)
November 26; 12:00	Woo S.H., Kim O.A., Ryu E.H. 8	(20–11)	Sashurkova 7	Guanggong Gymnasium, Guangzhou; Referees: Liu, Liu (CHN)
November 26; 12:00	3× (yellow card) 4× (suspension) 1× (red card)	Report	3× (yellow card) 2× (suspension) 1× (red card)	Guanggong Gymnasium, Guangzhou; Referees: Liu, Liu (CHN)

== Hockey ==
=== Women ===
Team

Galiya Baissarina
Alissa Cherkassova
Anastassiya Chserbakova
Irina Dobrioglo
Vera Domashneva
Natalya Gataulina
Gulnara Imangeliyeva
Aigerim Makhanova
Yuliya Mikheichik
Aliya Mukhambetova
Alessya Pyotukh
Natalya Sazontova
Viktoriya Shaimardanova
Yelena Svirskaya
Mariya Tussubzhanova
Olga Zhizhina

Preliminary round

Team	Pld	W	D	L	GF	GA	GD	Pts
China	6	5	1	0	31	4	+27	16
South Korea	6	5	1	0	24	5	+19	16
Japan	6	4	0	2	21	7	+14	12
India	6	3	0	3	24	6	+18	9
Malaysia	6	2	0	4	12	18	−6	6
Thailand	6	1	0	5	5	44	−39	3
Kazakhstan	6	0	0	6	3	36	−33	0

November 13
15:30

Japan	5 – 0 Awarded	Kazakhstan
Murakami 10', 29'; Mitsuhashi 17'; Nakashima 21'	Report	Domashneva 65'

Aoti Hockey Field 1, Guangzhou
Umpires:
Kang Hyun-Young (KOR)
Miskarmalia Mohd Ariffin (SIN)

November 14
15:30

South Korea	10 – 3	Kazakhstan
Kim Bo-Mi 4'; Lee Seon-Ok 24', 30', 35', 36', 40', 50'; Park Mi-Hyun 56', 69'; Kim Jong-Eun 66'	Report	Chsherbakova 21', 39'; Mikheichik 64'

Aoti Hockey Field 1, Guangzhou
Umpires:
Nor Piza Hassan (MAS)
Kitty Yau (HKG)

November 16
15:00

China	5 – 0 Awarded	Kazakhstan
Ma Yibo 2'; Zhao Yudiao 11'; Song Qingling 19'	Report

Aoti Hockey Field 1, Guangzhou
Umpires:
Nor Piza Hassan (MAS)
Miskarmalia Mohd Ariffin (SIN)

November 17
18:00

Kazakhstan	0 – 5 Awarded	Thailand
Chsherbakova 5', 12', 43'	Report

Aoti Hockey Field 1, Guangzhou
Umpires:
Kang Hyun-Young (KOR)
Kitty Yau (HKG)

November 19
14:30

Malaysia	5 – 0 Awarded	Kazakhstan
Sumantri 17', 66'; Abdul Rahman 41'; Silin 56'	Report

Aoti Hockey Field 2, Guangzhou
Umpires:
Kim Jung-Hee (KOR)
Miao Lin (CHN)

November 20
18:00

India	6 – 0	Kazakhstan
R. Devi 24', 44', 70'; Handa 40'; S. Kaur 54'; Karim 66'	Report

Aoti Hockey Field 1, Guangzhou
Umpires:
Chen Hong (CHN)
Miskarmalia Mohd Ariffin (SIN)

- Three players from Kazakhstan: Anastassiya Chsherbakova, Alessya Pyotukh and Yuliya Mikheichik were found guilty of representing Belarus in the 2010 World Cup Qualifiers earlier this year in Kazan, Russia . All matches that Kazakhstan lost below five goals margin was revised to 0–5 and those matches beyond that score are stand.

== Judo ==
=== Men ===
Athlete	Event	Preliminary	Round of 16	Quarterfinals	Final of table	Final
Athlete	Event	Opposition Result	Opposition Result	Opposition Result	Opposition Result	Opposition Result
Yerkebulan Kossayev	-60 kg	BYE	Kasym Populov (TKM); W 101-000	Dashdavaagiin Amartuvshin (MGL); L 000-002	Final of repechage match: Eisa Majrashi (KSA); W 120-002	Bronze medal match: Choi Min-Ho (KOR); L 000-101
Dastan Ykybayev	-66 kg	Amornthep Namwiset (THA); W 100-000	Ho Ngan Giang (VIE); W 110-000	Mirzohid Farmonov (UZB); L 000-100	Final of repechage match: BYE	Bronze medal match: Junpei Morishita (JPN); L 000-100
Rinat Ibragimov	-73 kg	BYE	Guvanch Nurmuhammedov (TKM); L 011-100	did not advance		
Islam Bozbayev	-81 kg	BYE	Georges Merheb (LIB); W 100-000	Masahiro Takamatsu (JPN); W 100-000	Shokir Muminov (UZB); L Hantei	Bronze medal match: Si Rijigawa (CHN); W 100-010; (silver) *
Timur Bolat	-90 kg	Abdullah Al-Otaibi (KUW); W 100-000	Sahil Pathania (IND); W 100-000	Chingiz Mamedov (KGZ); W 120-010	Takashi Ono (judoka) (JPN); L 000-100	Bronze medal match: Lee Kyu-Won (KOR); L 000-100
Maxim Rakov	-100 kg	BYE	Shah Hussain Shah (PAK); W 100-000	Ramziddin Sayidov (UZB); W 010-001	Hwang Hee-Tae (KOR); L Hantei	Bronze medal match: Naidangiin Tüvshinbayar (MGL); W 101-001 (bronze)
Yerzhan Shynkeyev	+100 kg		Hudayberdi Sahatov (TKM); W 001-000	Tomohiko Hoshina (PHI); W 101-000	Abdullo Tangriev (UZB); L 000-101	Bronze medal match: Mohammad Reza Roudaki (IRI); L 000-100
Ulan Ryskul	Open		Phengsy Phonepaseud (LAO); W 100-000	Hudayberdi Sahatov (TKM); W 111-000	Kazuhiko Takahashi (JPN); L 000-100	Bronze medal match: Utkir Kurbanov (UZB); L 000-100

* Shokir Muminov of Uzbekistan originally won the silver medal, but was disqualified after he tested positive for Methylhexanamine. Masahiro Takamatsu and Islam Bozbayev were raised to joint second and took silver medals.

=== Women ===
Athlete	Event	Preliminary	Round of 16	Quarterfinals	Final of table	Final
Athlete	Event	Opposition Result	Opposition Result	Opposition Result	Opposition Result	Opposition Result
Alexandra Podryadova	-48 kg		Humaira Ashiq (PAK); W 100-000	Wu Shugen (CHN); L Hantei	Final of repechage match: Khumujam Tombi Devi (IND); W 001-000	Bronze medal match: Baljinnyamyn Bat-Erdene (MGL); L 000-100
Sholpan Kaliyeva	-52 kg		Phonenaly Sayarath (LAO); W 100-000	Mönkhbaataryn Bundmaa (MGL); L 000-003	Final of repechage match: Rima Berdygulova (UZB); L 002-000	did not advance
Alina Ten	-57 kg	BYE	Anita Chanu (IND); W 100-000	Kaori Matsumoto (JPN); L 000-100	Final of repechage match: Zhu Guirong (CHN); L 101-000	did not advance
Zhanar Zhanzunova	-63 kg		Yoshie Ueno (JPN); L 000-100	did not advance		
Marian Urdabayeva	-70 kg		Nguyen Thi Nhu Y (VIE); W 100-000	Nasiba Surkiyeva (TKM); W 001-000	Sol Kyong (PRK); L 001-002	Bronze medal match: Tsend-Ayuushiin Naranjargal (MGL); L 000-100
Galiya Ulmentayeva	-78 kg			Pürevjargalyn Lkhamdegd (MGL); W 100-001	Akari Ogata (JPN); L 000-111	Bronze medal match: Dinara Kakharova (KGZ); W 101-000 (bronze)
Gulzhan Issanova	+78 kg			Dorjgotovyn Tserenkhand (MGL); W 001-000	Qin Qian (CHN); L 000-100	Bronze medal match: Huang Tzu-chin (TPE); W 100-000 (bronze)
Zarina Abdrassulova	Open		BYE	Kim Na-Young (KOR); L 000-100	Final of repechage match: Dinara Kakharova (KGZ); L 100-001	did not advance

== Karate ==
=== Men ===
Athlete	Event	1/16 Finals	1/8 Finals	Quarterfinals	Semifinals	Finals
Athlete	Event	Opposition Result	Opposition Result	Opposition Result	Opposition Result	Opposition Result
Darkhan Assadilov	Kumite -60kg	BYE	Tran Minh Duc (VIE); W 5-1	Amir Mehdizadeh (IRI); W 5-3	Sayed Mohammad Amiri (AFG); W WO	Bashar Al-Najjar (JOR); W 3-0 (gold)
Rinat Sagandykov	Kumite -67kg	Mukhammadzaid Iminov (UZB); W 1-0	Kang Song-Ji (PRK); W 6-2	Sufian Al-Malayeen (JOR); W Hantei	Fahad Al-Khathami (KSA); W 2-0	Abdullah Al-Otaibi (KUW); W 2-0 (gold)
Yermek Ainazarov	Kumite -75kg	BYE	Vikash Sharma (IND); W 5-2	Hamad Al-Nweam (KUW); L 0-3	Repechage 2 match: Saman Faiq (IRQ); L 1-2	did not advance
Ryutaro Araga	Kumite +84kg		BYE	Amer Abu-Afifeh (JOR); W 1-0	Zabihollah Poursheib (IRI); L 0-2	Bronze medal match: Ahmad Munir (KUW); W 6-1 (bronze)

=== Women ===
Athlete	Event	1/8 Finals	Quarterfinals	Semifinals	Finals
Athlete	Event	Opposition Result	Opposition Result	Opposition Result	Opposition Result
Venera Zhetibay	Kumite -50kg	Maria José dos Santos (TLS); W 9-0	Li Hong (CHN); L 0-1	Repechage 2 match: Yanisa Torrattanawathana (THA); L Hantei	did not advance
Yekaterina Khupovets	Kumite -55kg	Fatemeh Chalaki (IRI); L 0-1	did not advance		
Anna Zelenova	Kumite -68kg	Liu Ya-li (TPE); L 0-1	did not advance		
Gaukhar Chaikuzova	Kumite +68kg		Hamideh Abbasali (IRI); W 2-1	Jamaliah Jamaludin (MAS); L 0-1	Bronze medal match: Paula Cristina Pereira (MAC); L 4-7

== Modern Pentathlon ==
=== Women ===
Athlete	Event	Fencing			Swimming			Riding			Combined			Total Points	Final Rank
Athlete	Event	Results	Rank	MP Points	Time	Rank	MP Points	Penalties	Rank	MP Points	Time	Rank	MP Points	Total Points	Final Rank
Anna Shondina	Individual	13 V - 17 D	12th	776	2:32.13	11th	976	86.51	4th	1164	14:36.90	10th	1496	4412	9th
Xeniya Alexandrova	Individual	14 V - 16 D	9th	804	2:39.00	15th	892	83.36	9th	956	14:08.53	8th	1608	4260	11th
Lada Jiyenbalanova	Individual	19 V - 11 D	3rd	932	2:21.89	8th	1100	DNS		0	15:43.07	13th	1228	3260	13th
Galina Dolgushina	Individual	14 V - 16 D	9th	804	2:32.44	12th	972	95.03	12th	808	DNS		0	2584	15th
Anna Shondina; Xeniya Alexandrova; Lada Jiyenbalanova; Galina Dolgushina	Team		3rd	3316		3rd	3940		3rd	2928		3rd	4332	14516	3rd place, bronze medalist(s)

== Rowing ==
Men

Athlete	Event	Heats		Repechage		Final	
Athlete	Event	Time	Rank	Time	Rank	Time	Rank
Grigoriy Feklistov; Dmitriy Filimonov; Yevgeniy Latypov; Vitaliy Vassilyev	Coxless Four	6:28.08	5th F	auto advancement		6:26.35	4th
Vladislav Yakovlev	Lightweight Single Sculls	7:33.59	5th R	7:20.82	3rd	did not advance	
Artyom Issupov; Vladislav Yakovlev	Lightweight Double Sculls	6:55.76	6th R	6:48.76	3rd	did not advance	

Women

Athlete	Event	Heats		Repechage		Final	
Athlete	Event	Time	Rank	Time	Rank	Time	Rank
Mariya Filimonova	Single Sculls	8:02.02	4th F	auto advancement		8:12.00	4th
Oxana Nazarova; Svetlana Germanovich	Coxless Pair	7:37.81	2nd F	auto advancement		7:35.13	2nd place, silver medalist(s)
Yekaterina Artemyeva; Mariya Filimonova; Oxana Nazarova; Svetlana Germanovich	Coxless Four	7:03.80	4th F	auto advancement		6:59.24	3rd place, bronze medalist(s)
Alexandra Opachanova	Lightweight Single Sculls	8:03.68	3rd R	7:56.47	2nd F	7:58.56	4th

== Rugby ==
=== Women ===
Team

Olga Kumanikina
Irina Radzivil
Amina Baratova
Olessya Teryayeva
Olga Sazonova
Nigora Nurmatova
Marianna Balashova
Anna Yakovleva
Svetlana Klyuchnikova
Lyudmila Sherer
Irina Amossova
Irina Adler

Preliminary round

Pool B

Team	Pld	W	D	L	PF	PA	PD	Pts
Kazakhstan	3	3	0	0	100	7	+93	9
Japan	3	2	0	1	62	33	+29	7
Singapore	3	1	0	2	34	53	−19	5
India	3	0	0	3	5	108	−103	3

November 21
16:12

Kazakhstan	50 – 0	India
Try: Sherer (2) 2' m, 4' c Teryayeva (2) 6' c, 12' c Sazonova (3) 8' m, 10' c, 13' c Balashova 14' m Con: Radzivil (5/7)

University City Stadium, Guangzhou
Referee: Chou Wen-liang (Chinese Taipei)

November 22
9:46

Kazakhstan	29 – 0	Singapore
Try: Sherer (2) 1' c, 3' m Kumanikina 5' m Yakovleva 7' m Sazonova 14' c Con: Radzivil (2/5)

University City Stadium, Guangzhou
Referee: Gabriel Lee (Hong Kong)

November 22
13:46

Kazakhstan	21 – 7	Japan
Try: Sherer (2) 7' c, 11' c Teryayeva 10' c Con: Yakovleva (3/3)		Try: A. Suzuki 3' c Con: A. Suzuki (1/1)

University City Stadium, Guangzhou
Referee: Anthony Lothian (Hong Kong)

Quarterfinals

November 23
9:46

Kazakhstan	52 – 0	South Korea
Try: Adler 1' c Radzivil 2' m Amossova 6' m Teryayeva 7' c Balashova 8' c Sazonova (2) 11' c, 14' c Nurmatova 13' c Con: Radzivil (5/5); Baratova (1/1)

University City Stadium, Guangzhou
Referee: Akihisa Aso (Japan)

Semifinals

November 23
13:18

Kazakhstan	22 – 14	Thailand
Try: Sherer (2) 2' m, 12' m Sazonova 4' m Amossova 14' c Con: Radzivil (1/4)		Try: Wongwangchan 7' c Sawatnam 10' c Con: Bunrak (2/2)

University City Stadium, Guangzhou
Referee: Anthony Lothian (Hong Kong)

Gold medal match

November 23
17:48

China	14 – 17	Kazakhstan
Try: Wang Q.L. 6' c Gao Y. 15' c Con: Fan W.J. (1/1); Gao Y. (1/1)		Try: Amossova 4' m Sherer 13' c Yakovleva 15' m Con: Radzivil (1/3)

University City Stadium, Guangzhou
Referee: Gabriel Lee (Hong Kong)

== Shooting ==
Men

Event	Athlete	Qualification		Final	
Event	Athlete	Score	Rank	Score	Rank
Men's 10 m air pistol	Vyacheslav Podlesny	577-18x	14th	did not advance	
Men's 10 m air pistol	Vladimir Issachenko	571-19x	23rd	did not advance	
Men's 10 m air pistol	Rashid Yunusmetov	563-16x	34th	did not advance	
Men's 10 m air pistol team	Vyacheslav Podlesny; Vladimir Issachenko; Rashid Yunusmetov			1711-53x	6th
Men's 10 m air rifle	Igor Pirekeyev	588-37x	18th	did not advance	
Men's 10 m air rifle	Yuriy Yurkov	586-40x	21st	did not advance	
Men's 10 m air rifle	Vitaliy Dovgun	577-35x	41st	did not advance	
Men's 10 m air rifle team	Igor Pirekeyev; Yuriy Yurkov; Vitaliy Dovgun			1751-112x	7th
Men's 25 m standard pistol	Vladimir Issachenko			566-13x	10th
Men's 25 m standard pistol	Vyacheslav Podlesny			554-11x	19th
Men's 25 m standard pistol	Rashid Yunusmetov			546- 9x	29th
Men's 25 m standard pistol team	Vladimir Issachenko; Vyacheslav Podlesny; Rashid Yunusmetov			1666-33x	5th
Men's 50 m pistol	Vladimir Issachenko	557- 7x	6th Q	648.1	8th
Men's 50 m pistol	Rashid Yunusmetov	550- 9x	15th	did not advance	
Men's 50 m pistol	Vyacheslav Podlesny	539- 6x	29th	did not advance	
Men's 50 m pistol team	Vladimir Issachenko; Vyacheslav Podlesny; Rashid Yunusmetov			1646-22x	6th
Men's 50 m rifle prone	Yuriy Melsitov	594-37x	4th Q	697.9	2nd place, silver medalist(s)
Men's 50 m rifle prone	Alexandr Yermakov	589-36x	15th	did not advance	
Men's 50 m rifle prone	Igor Pirekeyev	588-36x	21st	did not advance	
Men's 50 m rifle prone team	Yuriy Melsitov; Alexandr Yermakov; Igor Pirekeyev			1771-109x	3rd place, bronze medalist(s)
Men's 50 m rifle three positions	Yuriy Yurkov	1158-42x QS-Off 51.2	8th Q	1256.0	6th
Men's 50 m rifle three positions	Vitaliy Dovgun	1160-41x	7th Q	1255.3	7th
Men's 50 m rifle three positions	Igor Pirekeyev	1160-49x	6th Q	1255.0	8th
Men's 50 m rifle prone team	Yuriy Yurkov; Vitaliy Dovgun; Igor Pirekeyev			3478-132x	2nd place, silver medalist(s)
Men's 10 m. running target	Andrey Gurov			569-11x	5th
Men's 10 m. running target	Rassim Mologly			566-15x	7th
Men's 10 m. running target	Bakhtiyar Ibrayev			556- 9x	11th
Men's 10 m. running target team	Andrey Gurov; Rassim Mologly; Bakhtiyar Ibrayev			1691-35x	3rd place, bronze medalist(s)
Men's 10 m. running target mixed	Andrey Gurov			374- 9x	8th
Men's 10 m. running target mixed	Rassim Mologly			374- 6x	9th
Men's 10 m. running target mixed	Bakhtiyar Ibrayev			365- 9x	17th
Men's 10 m. running target mixed team	Andrey Gurov; Rassim Mologly; Bakhtiyar Ibrayev			1113-24x	5th
Men's Trap	Andrey Mogilevskiy	114	10th	did not advance	
Men's Trap	Alexandr Gorun	111	19th	did not advance	
Men's Trap	Viktor Khassyanov	110	23rd	did not advance	
Men's Trap team	Andrey Mogilevskiy; Alexandr Gorun; Viktor Khassyanov			335	6th
Men's Skeet	Vladislav Mukhamediyev	117	5th Q	137^{+6}	5th
Men's Skeet	Sergey Kolos	113	17th	did not advance	
Men's Skeet	Sergey Yakshin	110	27th	did not advance	
Men's Skeet team	Vladislav Mukhamediyev; Sergey Kolos; Sergey Yakshin			340	6th

Women

Event	Athlete	Qualification		Final	
Event	Athlete	Score	Rank	Score	Rank
Women's 10 m air pistol	Zauresh Baibussinova	382-17x	3rd Q	478.2	5th
Women's 10 m air pistol	Galina Belyayeva	381-11x QS-Off 50.7	8th Q	474.8	8th
Women's 10 m air pistol	Yuliya Drishlyuk	374-13x	26th	did not advance	
Women's 10 m air pistol team	Zauresh Baibussinova; Galina Belyayeva; Yuliya Drishlyuk			1137-41x	6th
Women's 10 m air rifle	Olga Dovgun	390-27x	29th	did not advance	
Women's 10 m air rifle	Olessya Snegirevich	389-23x	37th	did not advance	
Women's 10 m air rifle	Alexandra Malinovskaya	387-22x	42nd	did not advance	
Women's 10 m air rifle team	Olga Dovgun; Olessya Snegirevich; Alexandra Malinovskaya			1166-72x	12th
Women's 25 m pistol	Yuliya Drishlyuk	581-13x	3rd Q	776.4	7th
Women's 25 m pistol	Galina Belyayeva	576- 9x	13th	did not advance	
Women's 25 m pistol	Zauresh Baibussinova	574-13x	17th	did not advance	
Women's 25 m pistol team	Yuliya Drishlyuk; Galina Belyayeva; Zauresh Baibussinova			1731-35x	1st place, gold medalist(s)
Women's 50 m rifle prone	Olga Dovgun			592-40x	2nd place, silver medalist(s)
Women's 50 m rifle prone	Olessya Snegirevich			585-28x	18th
Women's 50 m rifle prone	Alexandra Malinovskaya			582-21x	27th
Women's 50 m rifle prone team	Olga Dovgun; Olessya Snegirevich; Alexandra Malinovskaya			1759-89x	4th
Women's 50 m rifle three positions	Olga Dovgun	572-22x	14th	did not advance	
Women's 50 m rifle three positions	Olessya Snegirevich	570-14x	21st	did not advance	
Women's 50 m rifle three positions	Alexandra Malinovskaya	569-22x	22nd	did not advance	
Women's 50 m rifle three positions team	Olga Dovgun; Olessya Snegirevich; Alexandra Malinovskaya			1711-58x	6th
Women's 10 m running target	Natalya Gurova			367- 8x	5th
Women's 10 m running target	Botagoz Issenova			346- 3x	13th
Women's 10 m running target	Veranika Glushich			326- 4x	18th
Women's 10 m running target team	Natalya Gurova; Botagoz Issenova; Veranika Glushich			1039-15x	4th
Women's Trap	Anastassiya Davydova	65	7th	did not advance	
Women's Trap	Mariya Dmitriyenko	49	24th	did not advance	
Women's Skeet	Angelina Michshuk	66	4th Q	83^{+3}	5th
Women's Skeet	Anastassiya Molchanova	58	14th	did not advance	
Women's Skeet	Zhaniya Aidarkhanova	57	15th	did not advance	
Women's Skeet team	Angelina Michshuk; Anastassiya Molchanova; Zhaniya Aidarkhanova			181	4th

== Swimming ==
Men

Event	Athletes	Heat		Final	
Event	Athletes	Time	Rank	Time	Rank
50 m freestyle	Stanislav Kuzmin	23.23	9th	did not advance	
50 m freestyle	Artur Dilman	23.29	10th	did not advance	
100 m freestyle	Stanislav Kuzmin	51.05	10th	did not advance	
100 m freestyle	Artur Dilman	51.20	11th	did not advance	
200 m freestyle	Oleg Rabota	1:52.60	9th	did not advance	
200 m freestyle	Alexandr Ivanov	1:54.98	17th	did not advance	
400 m freestyle	Oleg Rabota	4:02.28	9th	did not advance	
400 m freestyle	Alexandr Ivanov	4:13.03	20th	did not advance	
50 m backstroke	Stanislav Ossinskiy	26.52	7th Q	26.21	6th
100 m backstroke	Stanislav Ossinskiy	56.94	7th Q	56.30	7th
200 m backstroke	Oleg Rabota	2:05.08	9th	did not advance	
200 m backstroke	Stanislav Ossinskiy	2:06.49	12th	did not advance	
50 m breaststroke	Vladislav Polyakov	28.23	4th Q	28.15	6th
50 m breaststroke	Yevgeniy Ryzhkov	28.38	12th	did not advance	
100 m breaststroke	Vladislav Polyakov	1:01.37	1st Q	1:01.03	2nd place, silver medalist(s)
100 m breaststroke	Yevgeniy Ryzhkov	1:02.74	5th Q	1:02.24	7th
200 m breaststroke	Vladislav Polyakov	2:15.49	3rd Q	2:12.38	5th
200 m breaststroke	Yevgeniy Ryzhkov	2:17.61	8th Q	2:14.94	6th
50 m butterfly	Rustam Khudiyev	24.84; Swim-off: 24.79	8th Q	24.72	8th
50 m butterfly	Stanislav Kuzmin	25.29	12th	did not advance	
100 m butterfly	Fedor Shkilyov	54.50	8th Q	55.05	8th
100 m butterfly	Stanislav Kuzmin	54.88	11th	did not advance	
200 m butterfly	Fedor Shkilyov	2:06.83	14th	did not advance	
200 m individual medley	Dmitriy Gordiyenko	2:06.24	9th	did not advance	
400 m individual medley	Dmitriy Gordiyenko	4:30.71	8th Q	4:30.21	8th
4×100 m freestyle	Artur Dilman; Oleg Rabota; Stanislav Kuzmin; Alexandr Ivanov	3:25.01	4th Q	3:23.54	4th
4×200 m freestyle	Artur Dilman; Dmitriy Gordiyenko; Oleg Rabota; Alexandr Ivanov; Stanislav Kuzmin*	7:38.77	7th Q	7:37.76	7th
4×100 m medley	Stanislav Ossinskiy; Vladislav Polyakov; Fedor Shkilyov; Stanislav Kuzmin; Yevgeniy Ryzhkov*; Rustam Khudiyev*; Artur Dilman*	3:46.32	3rd Q	3:40.55	3rd place, bronze medalist(s)

* Participated in the heats only.

Women

Event	Athletes	Heat		Final	
Event	Athletes	Time	Rank	Time	Rank
50 m backstroke	Yekaterina Rudenko	30.26	11th	did not advance	
100 m backstroke	Yekaterina Rudenko	1:05.63	12th	did not advance	
200 m backstroke	Yekaterina Rudenko	2:24.83	10th	did not advance	
50 m butterfly	Elmira Aigaliyeva	27.61	7th Q	27.72	7th
100 m butterfly	Elmira Aigaliyeva	1:01.65	10th	did not advance	
200 m butterfly	Elmira Aigaliyeva	2:17.74	10th	did not advance	

== Synchronized swimming ==
Athlete	Event	Technical Routine		Free Routine		Total	
Athlete	Event	Points	Rank	Points	Rank	Points	Rank
Anna Kulkina; Amina Yermakhanova; Aigerim Zhexembinova	Women's Duet	85.000	5th	85.500	5th	170.500	5th
Ainur Kerey, Aigerim Issayeva, Aigerim Zhexembinova, Alexandra Nemich; Yekaterina Nemich, Amina Yermakhanova, Tatyana Kukharskaya; Aigerim Anarbayeva, Aisulu Nauryzbayeva, Anna Kulkina	Women's Combination					85.375	3rd place, bronze medalist(s)

== Taekwondo ==
=== Men ===
Athlete	Event	Round of 32	Round of 16	Quarterfinals	Semifinals	Final
Athlete	Event	Opposition Result	Opposition Result	Opposition Result	Opposition Result	Opposition Result
Nariman Shakirov	Finweight (-54kg)	Mateus Soares (TLS); W PTS 19-5	Ajaiman Al-Ojaiman (KUW); L PTS 4-6	did not advance		
Zhalgas Bekkassymov	Flyweight (-58kg)	BYE	Pen-Ek Karaket (THA); L PTS 3-4	did not advance		
Darkhan Kassymkulov	Bantamweight (-63kg)	Surendra Bhandari (KUW); W PTS 8-7	Jawad Lakzaee (AFG); L PTS 5-10	did not advance		
Aibar Dyussebayev	Lightweight (-74kg)	BYE	Dmitriy Kim (UZB); L PTS 3-4	did not advance		
Sultan Kassymov	Welterweight (-80kg)	BYE	Alisher Gulov (TJK); L PTS 2-6	did not advance		
Arman Chilmanov	Heavyweight (+87kg)		BYE	Hossein Tajik (IRI); W SUP 0-0	Zheng Yi (CHN); L PTS 13-15 (bronze)	did not advance

=== Women ===
Athlete	Event	Round of 32	Round of 16	Quarterfinals	Semifinals	Final
Athlete	Event	Opposition Result	Opposition Result	Opposition Result	Opposition Result	Opposition Result
Aizhan Alizhanova	Finweight (-46kg)		Nurul Asfahlina Johari (MAS); L PTS 1-2	did not advance		
Saule Sardarova	Bantamweight (-53kg)	Irina Kaydashova (UZB); L PTS 3-5	did not advance			
Yekaterina Dmitriyeva	Featherweight (-57kg)	BYE	Aida de Jesús (TLS); W WDR Round 3 2:00	Sousan Hajipour (IRI); L PTS 7-8	did not advance	
Elvira Kadyrbayeva	Lightweight (-62kg)		BYE	Noh Eun-Sil (KOR); L PTS 2-24	did not advance	
Gulnafis Aitmukhambetova	Welterweight (-67kg)			Chuang Chia-chia (TPE); W PTS 3-2	Parisa Farshidi (IRI); L PTS 3-4 (bronze)	did not advance
Feruza Yergeshova	Middleweight (-73kg)			Soheila Sayyahi (IRI); W PTS 6-3	Kirstie Alora (PHI); W PTS 7-3	Luo Wei (CHN); L PTS 4-5 (silver)

== Triathlon ==
Athlete	Event	Swim (1.5 km)	Trans 1	Bike (40 km)	Trans 2	Run (10 km)	Total	Rank
Dmitriy Gaag	Men's Individual	19:12; 9th	1:06; 6th	59:56; 2nd	0:39; 4th	32:12; 4th	1:53:08.21	3rd place, bronze medalist(s)
Dmitriy Smurov	Men's Individual	19:11; 8th	1:04; 3rd	1:00:00; 4th	0:46; 14th	32:43; 5th	1:53:46.42	4th
Yekaterina Shatnaya	Women's Individual	24:08; 10th	1:19; 8th	1:10:18; 8th	0:52; 8th	38:55; 6th	2:15:33.29	8th
Karolina Solovyova	Women's Individual	23:10; 9th	1:19; 9th	1:11:16; 9th	0:55; 9th	44:06; 9th	2:20:47.88	9th

== Volleyball ==
=== Men ===
Team

Asset Bazarkulov
Vitaliy Erdshtein
Dmitriy Gorbatkov
Marat Imangaliyev
Nodirkhan Kadirkhanov
Sergey Kuznetsov
Vitaliy Mironenko
Alexandr Stolnikov
Yuriy Stulov
Vitaliy Virodin
Sergey Yembulayev
Anton Yudin

==== Preliminary round ====
Group B

Pos	Team	Pld	W	L	Pts	SPW	SPL	SPR	SW	SL	SR	Qualification
1	South Korea	3	3	0	6	225	148	1.520	9	0	MAX	Second round / Group E–F
2	India	3	2	1	5	232	222	1.045	6	4	1.500	Second round / Group E–F
3	Kazakhstan	3	1	2	4	236	252	0.937	4	7	0.571	Second round / Group G–H
4	Vietnam	3	0	3	3	175	246	0.711	1	9	0.111	Second round / Group G–H

Source: Results

Date	Time		Score		Set 1	Set 2	Set 3	Set 4	Set 5	Total
14 Nov	18:00	India	3–1	Kazakhstan	24–26	25–23	25–18	25–21		99–88
15 Nov	16:00	Vietnam	1–3	Kazakhstan	19–25	25–21	11–25	23–25		78–96
17 Nov	16:00	Kazakhstan	0–3	South Korea	16–25	14–25	22–25			52–75

==== Second round ====
Group H

Pos	Team	Pld	W	L	Pts	SPW	SPL	SPR	SW	SL	SR	Qualification
1	Kazakhstan	3	3	0	6	266	198	1.343	9	2	4.500	Placement 9–12
2	Athletes from Kuwait	3	2	1	5	275	270	1.019	7	6	1.167	Placement 9–12
3	Myanmar	3	1	2	4	199	233	0.854	4	6	0.667	Placement 13–16
4	Vietnam	3	0	3	3	236	275	0.858	3	9	0.333	Placement 13–16

Source: Results

Date	Time		Score		Set 1	Set 2	Set 3	Set 4	Set 5	Total
19 Nov	18:00	Kazakhstan	3–0	Myanmar	25–14	25–11	25–22			75–47
20 Nov	20:00	Kazakhstan	3–1	Kuwait	20–25	25–20	25–11	25–17		95–73

==== Placement ====
Placement 9–12

Date	Time		Score		Set 1	Set 2	Set 3	Set 4	Set 5	Total
21 Nov	20:00	Kazakhstan	3–2	Chinese Taipei	26–24	25–27	25–22	23–25	23–21	122–119

Placement 9th–10th

Date	Time		Score		Set 1	Set 2	Set 3	Set 4	Set 5	Total
23 Nov	20:00	Pakistan	0–3	Kazakhstan	21–25	22–25	29–31			72–81

=== Women ===
Team

Natalya Zhukova
Sana Jarlagassova
Olga Nassedkina
Olessya Arslanova
Korinna Ishimtseva
Irina Lukomskaya
Yelena Ezau
Marina Storozhenko
Yuliya Kutsko
Lyudmila Anarbayeva
Inna Matveyeva
Olga Dobryshevskaya

==== Preliminary round ====
Group B

Pos	Team	Pld	W	L	Pts	SPW	SPL	SPR	SW	SL	SR	Qualification
1	Kazakhstan	5	5	0	10	443	317	1.397	15	4	3.750	Quarterfinals
2	North Korea	5	4	1	9	431	316	1.364	14	5	2.800	Quarterfinals
3	Japan	5	3	2	8	395	344	1.148	10	8	1.250	Quarterfinals
4	Chinese Taipei	5	2	3	7	429	365	1.175	11	9	1.222	Quarterfinals
5	India	5	1	4	6	260	319	0.815	3	12	0.250	Placement 9–11
6	Maldives	5	0	5	5	78	375	0.208	0	15	0.000	Placement 9–11

Source: Results

Date	Time		Score		Set 1	Set 2	Set 3	Set 4	Set 5	Total
18 Nov	12:00	Kazakhstan	3–0	Maldives	25–7	25–6	25–3			75–16
19 Nov	16:00	Kazakhstan	3–1	Chinese Taipei	25–19	17–25	25–19	25–19		92–82
20 Nov	14:00	North Korea	2–3	Kazakhstan	22–25	25–22	25–17	16–25	10–15	98–104
21 Nov	12:00	Kazakhstan	3–0	India	25–18	25–9	25–10			75–37
22 Nov	16:00	Japan	1–3	Kazakhstan	15–25	25–22	23–25	21–25		84–97

==== Finals ====
Quarterfinals

Date	Time		Score		Set 1	Set 2	Set 3	Set 4	Set 5	Total
24 Nov	18:00	Kazakhstan	3–0	Mongolia	25–18	25–8	25–12			75–38

Semifinals

Date	Time		Score		Set 1	Set 2	Set 3	Set 4	Set 5	Total
25 Nov	18:00	Kazakhstan	0–3	South Korea	15–25	17–25	19–25			51–75

Bronze medal match

Date	Time		Score		Set 1	Set 2	Set 3	Set 4	Set 5	Total
27 Nov	10:00	Kazakhstan	3–0	North Korea	25–21	25–16	25–22			75–59

== Water polo ==
=== Men ===
Team

Alexandr Shvedov
Sergey Gubarev
Alexandr Gaidukov
Murat Shakenov
Alexey Panfili
Roman Pilipenko
Alexandr Axenov
Rustam Ukumanov
Yevgeniy Zhilyayev
Mikhail Ruday
Ravil Manafov
Azamat Zhulumbetov
Nikolay Maximov

Preliminary

Group B

Pos	Team	Pld	W	D	L	GF	GA	GD	Pts	Qualification
1	Kazakhstan	3	3	0	0	58	9	+49	6	Quarterfinals
2	Athletes from Kuwait	3	1	1	1	18	29	−11	3 (Note: Head-to-head result: IOC 7–7 SIN. Goal difference against the highest placed team (KAZ): IOC −13, SIN −16.)	Quarterfinals
3	Singapore	3	1	1	1	23	37	−14	3	Quarterfinals
4	Saudi Arabia	3	0	0	3	20	44	−24	0	Quarterfinals

Source: Results
Notes:

November 18; 9:00	Report	Saudi Arabia	3–23	Kazakhstan	Tianhe Natatorium, Guangzhou; Referees: Lee (KOR), Makihashi (JPN)
November 18; 9:00	Report	Score by quarters: 0–5, 0–6, 2–5, 1–7			Tianhe Natatorium, Guangzhou; Referees: Lee (KOR), Makihashi (JPN)
November 18; 9:00	Report	Al-Malki, Al-Dughather, Al-Olayan 1	Goals	Gubarev 5	Tianhe Natatorium, Guangzhou; Referees: Lee (KOR), Makihashi (JPN)

November 20; 10:25	Report	Kuwait	1–14	Kazakhstan	Tianhe Natatorium, Guangzhou; Referees: Shi (CHN), Chung (HKG)
November 20; 10:25	Report	Score by quarters: 0–7, 0–2, 0–3, 1–2			Tianhe Natatorium, Guangzhou; Referees: Shi (CHN), Chung (HKG)
November 20; 10:25	Report	Khan 1	Goals	Axenov 4	Tianhe Natatorium, Guangzhou; Referees: Shi (CHN), Chung (HKG)

November 22; 15:55	Report	Singapore	5–21	Kazakhstan	Tianhe Natatorium, Guangzhou; Referees: Chung (HKG), Lee (KOR)
November 22; 15:55	Report	Score by quarters: 0–6, 3–4, 0–5, 2–6			Tianhe Natatorium, Guangzhou; Referees: Chung (HKG), Lee (KOR)
November 22; 15:55	Report	Five players 1	Goals	Axenov 6	Tianhe Natatorium, Guangzhou; Referees: Chung (HKG), Lee (KOR)

Quarterfinals

November 23; 20:55	Report	Hong Kong	1–25	Kazakhstan	Tianhe Natatorium, Guangzhou; Referees: Al-Saad (KUW), Al-Sheaifi (KSA)
November 23; 20:55	Report	Score by quarters: 0–8, 0–5, 1–8, 0–4			Tianhe Natatorium, Guangzhou; Referees: Al-Saad (KUW), Al-Sheaifi (KSA)
November 23; 20:55	Report	To 1	Goals	Ruday 6	Tianhe Natatorium, Guangzhou; Referees: Al-Saad (KUW), Al-Sheaifi (KSA)

Semifinals

November 24; 20:55	Report	Japan	8–10	Kazakhstan	Tianhe Natatorium, Guangzhou; Referees: Bock (GER), Stavridis (GRE)
November 24; 20:55	Report	Score by quarters: 2–3, 3–4, 1–0, 2–3			Tianhe Natatorium, Guangzhou; Referees: Bock (GER), Stavridis (GRE)
November 24; 20:55	Report	Hazui 3	Goals	Gubarev 3	Tianhe Natatorium, Guangzhou; Referees: Bock (GER), Stavridis (GRE)

Gold medal match

November 25; 21:10	Report	China	6–7	Kazakhstan	Tianhe Natatorium, Guangzhou; Referees: Stavridis (GRE), Koganov (AZE)
November 25; 21:10	Report	Score by quarters: 4–2, 1–2, 0–1, 1–2			Tianhe Natatorium, Guangzhou; Referees: Stavridis (GRE), Koganov (AZE)
November 25; 21:10	Report	Pan N. 4	Goals	Zhilyayev 2	Tianhe Natatorium, Guangzhou; Referees: Stavridis (GRE), Koganov (AZE)

=== Women ===
Team

Galina Rytova
Natalya Shepelina
Kamila Zakirova
Anna Turova
Liliya Falaleyeva
Anna Zubkova
Zamira Myrzabekova
Yekaterina Gariyeva
Aizhan Akilbayeva
Marina Gritsenko
Yelena Chebotova
Assem Mussarova
Alexandra Turova

Pos	Team	Pld	W	D	L	GF	GA	GD	Pts
1	China	3	3	0	0	76	8	+68	6
2	Kazakhstan	3	2	0	1	57	20	+37	4
3	Uzbekistan	3	1	0	2	26	41	−15	2
4	India	3	0	0	3	6	96	−90	0

Source: Results

November 15; 14:30	Report	Kazakhstan	38–2	India	Tianhe Natatorium, Guangzhou; Referees: Tan (SIN), Chung (HKG)
November 15; 14:30	Report	Score by quarters: 13–1, 14–0, 8–0, 3–1			Tianhe Natatorium, Guangzhou; Referees: Tan (SIN), Chung (HKG)
November 15; 14:30	Report	Myrzabekova 5	Goals	Varghese, Bhoite 1	Tianhe Natatorium, Guangzhou; Referees: Tan (SIN), Chung (HKG)

November 16; 14:30	Report	Uzbekistan	5–14	Kazakhstan	Tianhe Natatorium, Guangzhou; Referees: Margeta (SLO), Koganov (AZE)
November 16; 14:30	Report	Score by quarters: 1–4, 1–2, 0–3, 3–5			Tianhe Natatorium, Guangzhou; Referees: Margeta (SLO), Koganov (AZE)
November 16; 14:30	Report	Sarancha 2	Goals	Shepelina, An. Turova, Chebotova 3	Tianhe Natatorium, Guangzhou; Referees: Margeta (SLO), Koganov (AZE)

November 17; 15:55	Report	China	13–5	Kazakhstan	Tianhe Natatorium, Guangzhou; Referees: Bock (GER), Margeta (SLO)
November 17; 15:55	Report	Score by quarters: 4–1, 3–2, 1–1, 5–1			Tianhe Natatorium, Guangzhou; Referees: Bock (GER), Margeta (SLO)
November 17; 15:55	Report	Teng F. 3	Goals	Shepelina, Chebotova 2	Tianhe Natatorium, Guangzhou; Referees: Bock (GER), Margeta (SLO)

== Weightlifting ==
Athlete	Event	Snatch			Clean & Jerk			Total	Rank
Athlete	Event	Attempt 1	Attempt 2	Attempt 3	Attempt 1	Attempt 2	Attempt 3	Total	Rank
Medet Jundubayev	Men's 69 kg	125	~~130~~	130	153	~~156~~	156	286	7th
Kirill Pavlov	Men's 77 kg	140	145	147	170	175	178	325	2nd place, silver medalist(s)
Dauren Shauyeteyev	Men's 77 kg	140	~~145~~	~~147~~	170	~~186~~	~~186~~	310	3rd place, bronze medalist(s)
Vladimir Kuznetsov	Men's 85 kg	160	165	167	~~200~~	~~200~~	201	368	5th
Ilya Ilin	Men's 94 kg	170	175	~~178~~	215	219	~~227~~	394	1st place, gold medalist(s)
Almas Uteshov	Men's 94 kg	155	165	170	201	~~213~~	~~213~~	371	6th
Sergey Istomin	Men's 105 kg	~~180~~	180	~~183~~	216	~~223~~	~~223~~	396	3rd place, bronze medalist(s)
Igor Vashanov	Men's 105 kg	160	170	~~175~~	200	205	~~210~~	375	5th
Zulfiya Chinshanlo	Women's 53 kg	90	95	97	122	~~130~~	~~130~~	219	2nd place, silver medalist(s)
Svetlana Cheremshanova	Women's 58 kg	~~85~~	85	~~90~~	110	115	~~116~~	200	11th
Maiya Maneza	Women's 63 kg	103	~~106~~	106	133	~~135~~	135	241	1st place, gold medalist(s)
Svetlana Podobedova	Women's 75 kg	125	130 AR	---	150	157 AR	---	287 AR	1st place, gold medalist(s)
Tatyana Khromova	Women's 75 kg	107	112	115	135	~~141~~	~~141~~	250	3rd place, bronze medalist(s)
Mariya Grabovetskaya	Women's +75 kg	125	130	135	145	155	~~160~~	290	3rd place, bronze medalist(s)
Alexandra Aborneva	Women's +75 kg	105	110	112	140	145	~~150~~	257	4th

== Wrestling ==
=== Men ===
Freestyle

Athlete	Event	Round of 32	Round of 16	Quarterfinals	Semifinals	Final
Athlete	Event	Opposition Result	Opposition Result	Opposition Result	Opposition Result	Opposition Result
Daulet Niyazbekov	55 kg		Firas Al-Rifaei (SYR); W ST 4-0	Yasuhiro Inaba (JPN); L PO 0-3	did not advance	
Dauren Zhumagaziyev	60 kg	BYE	Ali Riyadh (IRQ); W PO 3-0	Lee Seung-Chul (KOR); W PP 3-1	Hiroyuki Oda (JPN); L PP 1-3	Bronze medal match: Ri Jong-Myong (PRK); W PP 3-1 (bronze)
Leonid Spiridonov	66 kg		Mehdi Taghavi (IRI); L PP 1-3	Did not advance	Repechage Round 1 match: Shan Chengde (CHN); W PO 3-0	Bronze medal match: Ikhtiyor Navruzov (UZB); W P0 3-0 (bronze)
Seifaddin Osmanov	74 kg		Rashid Kurbanov (UZB); W PP 3-1	Lee Yun-Seok (KOR); L PP 1-3	did not advance	
Yermek Baiduashov	84 kg		Toryalai Sadeqi (AFG); W PO 3-0	Muhammad Inam (PAK); W PO 3-0	Jamal Mirzaei (IRI); L PO 0-3	Bronze medal match: Maher Al-Khayat (SYR); W ST 4-0 (bronze)
Taimuraz Tigiyev	96 kg		Mausam Khatri (IND); W PP 3-1	Reza Yazdani (IRI); L EV 0-5	did not advance	
Nurzhan Katayev	120 kg		Shodi Bakhromov (TJK); W VT 5-0	Mohammed Sabah (IRQ); W PO 3-0	Artur Taymazov (UZB); L PO 0-3	Bronze medal match: Fardin Masoumi (IRI); W VB 5-0 (bronze)

Greco-Roman

Athlete	Event	Round of 16	Quarterfinals	Semifinals	Final
Athlete	Event	Opposition Result	Opposition Result	Opposition Result	Opposition Result
Marat Karishalov	55 kg	Kohei Hasegawa (JPN); L PO 0-3	Did not advance	Repechage Round 1 match: Kritsada Kongsrichai (THA); W ST 4-0	Bronze medal match: Hamid Sourian (IRI); W P0 3-0 (bronze)
Nurbakyt Tengizbayev	60 kg	BYE	Ravinder Singh (IND); L PP 1-3	did not advance	
Darkhan Bayakhmetov	66 kg	Besiki Saldadze (UZB); W PO 3-0	Hussein Abbas (IRQ); W PO 3-0	Tsutomu Fujimura (JPN); W PO 3-0	Saeid Abdevali (IRI); L PP 1-3 (silver)
Roman Melyoshin	74 kg	Kiyas Esenov (TKM); W PO 3-0	Daniar Kobonov (KGZ); L PP 1-3	Repechage Round 1 match: Sanjay Kumar (IND); W PO 3-0	Bronze medal match: Park Jin-Sung (KOR); L PP 1-3
Alkhazur Ozdiyev	84 kg	BYE	Noor Ahmad Ahmadi (AFG); W PO 3-0	Lee Se-Yeol (KOR); L PP 1-3	Bronze medal match: Ma Sanyi (CHN); W PP 3-1 (bronze)
Asset Mambetov	96 kg	BYE	An Chang-Gun (KOR); W PO 3-0	Yahia Abu-Tabeekh (JOR); W PO 3-0	Babak Ghorbani (IRI) 'L PP 1-3 (silver)
Nurmakhan Tinaliyev	120 kg	Chum Chivinn (CAM); W VT 5-0	Dharmender Dalal (IND); W PO 3-0	Amir Aliakbari (IRI); W PP 3-1	Liu Deli (CHN); W PP 3-1 (gold)

=== Women ===
Freestyle

Athlete	Event	Round of 16	Quarterfinals	Semifinals	Final
Athlete	Event	Opposition Result	Opposition Result	Opposition Result	Opposition Result
Zhuldyz Eshimova	48 kg	Nirmala Devi (IND); W PP 3-1	Kim Hyung-Joo (PRK); L PP 1-3	did not advance	
Aiyim Abdildina	55 kg	BYE	Aisulu Tynybekova (KGZ); W PO 3-0	Zhang Lan (CHN); L PP 1-3	Bronze medal match: Darunee Orain (THA); W VT 5-0 (bronze)
Yelena Shalygina	63 kg	BYE	Wilaiwan Thongkam (THA); W VT 5-0	Park Sang-Eun (KOR); W PP 3-1	Ochirbatyn Nasanburmaa (MGL); W VT 5-0 (gold)
Guzel Manyurova	72 kg		Gursharan Preet Kaur (IND); W VT 5-0	Gelegjamtsyn Naranchimeg (MGL); W PP 3-1	Bronze medal match: Tran Thi Hoa (VIE); W VT 5-0 (bronze)

== Wushu ==
=== Men ===
Sanshou

Athlete	Event	Round of 16	Quarterfinals	Semifinals	Final
Athlete	Event	Opposition Result	Opposition Result	Opposition Result	Opposition Result
Ramis Kurtidi	65 kg	Nguyen Van Tuan (VIE); L PTS 0-2	did not advance		
Birzhan Abdolla	70 kg	Nurmyrat Babayev (TKM); W PTS 2-0	Vuong Dinh Khanh (VIE); L PTS 0-2	did not advance	

=== Women ===
Changquan

Athlete	Event	Changquan		Total	
Athlete	Event	Result	Rank	Result	Rank
Anel Sanat Kyzy	Changquan	7.29	13th		
