= Ren Wenjun =

Chinese canoeist

Personal information
- Nationality: China
- Born: 15 January 1992 (age 34) Binzhou, Shandong, China
- Height: 1.75 m (5 ft 9 in)
- Weight: 67 kg (148 lb)

Sport
- Sport: Canoeing
- Event: Sprint canoe
Medal record
Women's canoe sprint
Representing China
Asian Games
| Gold medal – first place | 2010 Guangzhou | K-4 500 m |
| Gold medal – first place | 2014 Incheon | K-4 500 m |
| Silver medal – second place | 2014 Incheon | K-2 500 m |
Asian Championships
| Gold medal – first place | 2011 Tehran | K-2 500 m |
| Gold medal – first place | 2011 Tehran | K-2 1000 m |
| Gold medal – first place | 2011 Tehran | K-4 500 m |
| Gold medal – first place | 2015 Palembang | K-2 500 m |
| Gold medal – first place | 2015 Palembang | K-4 500 m |
| Gold medal – first place | 2017 Shanghai | K-4 200 m |
| Gold medal – first place | 2017 Shanghai | K-4 500 m |
| Silver medal – second place | 2013 Samarkand | K-4 500 m |
| Silver medal – second place | 2017 Shanghai | K-2 200 m |

Ren Wenjun (Chinese: 任文君; pinyin: Rén Wénjūn; born January 15, 1992, in Binzhou, Shandong) is a Chinese sprint canoeist. She won a gold medal, as a member of the Chinese women's kayak four team, at the 2010 Asian Games in Guangzhou, China, with a time of 1:34.440. This was despite 2010 being the year Ren made her international debut.

Ren represented China at the 2012 Summer Olympics in London, where she competed in the women's K-4 500 metres, along with her teammates Yu Lamei, Liu Haiping, and Li Zhangli. Ren and her team, however, fell short in their bid for the final, as they finished last in the semi-final round by eighteen hundredths of a second (0.18) behind the Serbian team (led by Antonia Horvat-Panda), recording the slowest time of 1:34.004.

Ren won a second gold medal at the 2014 Asian Games, also in the women's K-4 500m, with Huang Jieyi, Ma Qing and Liu Haiping. She also won silver in the K-2 500 m with Ma.

At the 2016 Olympics, she competed in the women's K-2 500 metres (with Ma Qing), finishing in 14th place, and in the women's K-4 500 m (with Liu Haiping, Ma Qing and Li Yue), finishing in 11th.
