= Anatoly Treskin =

Soviet artist and restorer

Anatoly Vladimirovich Treskin (Russian: Анатолий Владимирович Трескин) (1905–1986) was a Soviet art restorer and artist.

== Early life ==
Treskin was born in St. Petersburg in 1905. He received a diploma as an artist-technician from VKHUTEMAS in 1928.

== Career ==
In his early career, he engaged in the restoration of the decor of the Shuvalov Palace, the Yusupov Palace and the Stroganov Palace, as well as the muralist painted cultural centers, health centers and workers' clubs.

Treskin joined the Red Army in 1942, working on the Hanko Peninsula and then in the Siege of Leningrad. He served as chief artist of the Political Administration of the Baltic Fleet, painting portraits of heroic sailors and pilots. After the war, Treskin participated in the restoration of the Mariinsky Theatre, the Maly Opera House, the Hermitage Museum and The Russian Museum. He restored the halls of the Oranienbaum, as well as working in Novgorod, Pskov, Suzdal and Tsarskoye Selo. From the 1950s to the 1970s, he led the work on the restoration of paintings in Pavlovsk Palace.

His works are currently held in both the museums of St. Petersburg and private collections. In 2005, the Russian Museum and Pavlovsk Palace co-organized an exhibition commemorating his 100 years prior.

He died in 1986 in Leningrad.

== Awards ==
- Gold Medal of the USSR Academy of Arts
- Order of the Red Star (Decree No. / Order 133, 11.6.1944, the database record number 1424680352)
- Order of the Patriotic War II degree (№ premium paper 176 from 06.11.1985, the database record number - 1521048347) .
- People's Artist of the RSFSR
- RSFSR State Prize in Architecture (1972)
