= Wu Yanan (canoeist) =

Chinese canoeist

Personal information
- Nationality: China
- Born: 8 December 1985 (age 40) Chuzhou, Anhui, China
- Height: 1.69 m (5 ft 6 1/2 in)
- Weight: 60 kg (132 lb)

Sport
- Sport: Canoeing
- Event: Sprint canoe
Medal record
Women's canoe sprint
Representing China
Asian Games
Gold medal – first place	2010 Guangzhou	K-4 500 m
Asian Championships
Gold medal – first place	2011 Tehran	K-2 200 m
Gold medal – first place	2011 Tehran	K-2 500 m
Gold medal – first place	2011 Tehran	K-4 500 m
Silver medal – second place	2013 Samarkand	K-1 200 m
Silver medal – second place	2015 Palembang	K-2 200 m

Wu Yanan (simplified Chinese: 吴 亚男; traditional Chinese: 吳 亞男; pinyin: Wú Yànán; born December 8, 1985, in Chuzhou, Anhui) is a Chinese sprint canoeist. She won a gold medal, as a member of the Chinese women's kayak four team, at the 2010 Asian Games in Guangzhou, China, with a time of 1:34.440.

Wu represented China at the 2012 Summer Olympics in London, where she competed in the women's K-2 500 metres. Wu and her partner Zhou Yu narrowly missed out on an Olympic medal in the A-final by almost fourteen hundredths of a second (0.14), finishing behind the Polish bronze medal-winning pair of Karolina Naja and Beata Mikołajczyk, with a time of 1:44.136.
