= Yelena Antonova (cyclist) =

Kazakhstani cyclist

Personal information
- Born: 22 April 1971 (age 55) Kazakhstan

Cycling career
- Sport: Cycling
- Discipline: Road cycling

Yelena Antonova is a road cyclist from Kazakhstan. She represented her nation at the 2011 UCI Road World Championships.
