= Alexey Dergunov =

Kazakhstani sprint canoer (born 1984)

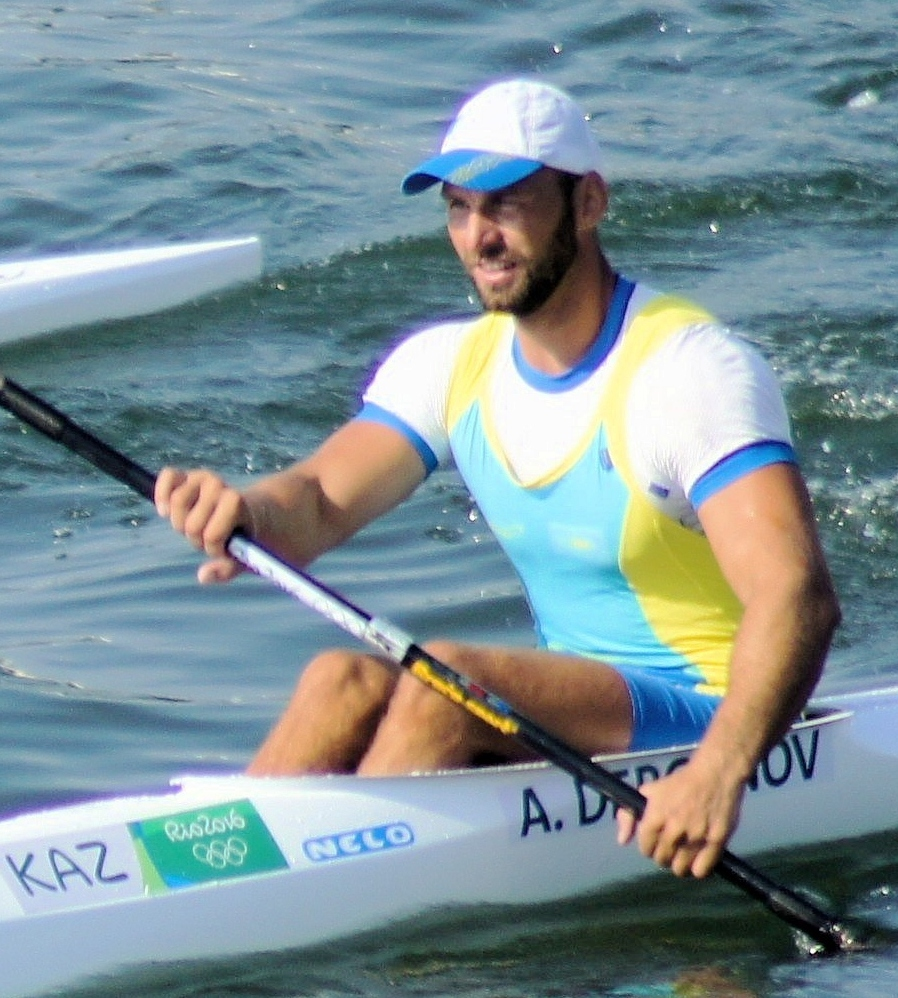
- Dergunov at the 2016 Olympics

Personal information
- Born: 16 September 1984 (age 41) Oral, Kazakh SSR, Soviet Union
- Height: 187 cm (6 ft 2 in)
- Weight: 95 kg (209 lb)

Sport
- Sport: Canoe sprint
- Club: Akzhayik
- Coached by: Andrey Shantarovich (national); Alexander Akunishnikov (personal)
Medal record
Representing Kazakhstan
Asian Games
Gold medal – first place	2014 Incheon	K-2 1000m
Gold medal – first place	2018 Jakarta-Palembang	K-4 500m
Silver medal – second place	2010 Guangzhou	K-2 1000m
Silver medal – second place	2014 Incheon	K-2 200m
Asian Championships
Gold medal – first place	2009 Tehran	K-1 500 m
Gold medal – first place	2009 Tehran	K-2 500 m
Gold medal – first place	2009 Tehran	K-2 1000 m
Gold medal – first place	2011 Tehran	K-2 1000 m
Gold medal – first place	2013 Samarkand	K-2 200 m
Gold medal – first place	2013 Samarkand	K-2 500 m
Gold medal – first place	2013 Samarkand	K-2 1000 m
Gold medal – first place	2015 Palembang	K-2 1000 m
Gold medal – first place	2017 Shanghai	K-2 200 m
Gold medal – first place	2017 Shanghai	K-4 500 m
Silver medal – second place	2007 Hwacheon	K-4 500 m
Silver medal – second place	2009 Tehran	K-2 200 m
Silver medal – second place	2009 Tehran	K-2 5000 m
Silver medal – second place	2011 Tehran	K-2 200 m
Bronze medal – third place	2007 Hwacheon	K-4 1000 m

Alexey Viktorovich Dergunov (Russian: Алексей Викторович Дергунов; born 16 September 1984) is a Kazakhstani canoe sprinter who won a gold and a silver medal in doubles (K-2 200 m and 1000 m) at the 2014 Asian Games. Earlier at the 2008 Summer Olympics he was eliminated in the semifinals of the K-2 500 m event (with Dmitry Kaltenberger). At the 2012 Summer Olympics, competing with Yevgeny Alekseyev, he was knocked out in the first round of the K-2 200 m but reached the semifinals of the K-2 1000 m. At the 2016 Rio Games he failed to reach the finals of the K-1 200 m and K-2 1000 m events.

Dergunov took up kayaking in 1996. He has a degree in physical education from West Kazakhstan State University. He is married to Natalia and has a son Nikon.
