= Alexandr Dyadchuk =

Kazakhstani canoeist (born 1983)

Medal record

Men's canoe sprint

Representing Kazakhstan

Asian Games
Silver medal – second place	2010 Guangzhou	C-1 200 m

Asian Championships
Gold medal – first place	2005 Putrajaya	C-1 200 m
Gold medal – first place	2005 Putrajaya	C-2 200 m
Gold medal – first place	2005 Putrajaya	C-2 500 m
Gold medal – first place	2005 Putrajaya	C-4 200 m
Gold medal – first place	2007 Hwacheon	C-2 200 m
Silver medal – second place	2007 Hwacheon	C-2 500 m
Silver medal – second place	2011 Tehran	C-1 200 m
Bronze medal – third place	2005 Putrajaya	C-4 500 m

Aleksandr Dyadchuk (born 5 February 1983 in Alma-Ata) is a Kazakhstani sprint canoeist who competed in the late 2000s and 2010s. At the 2008 Summer Olympics in Beijing, he was eliminated in the semifinals of the C-2 500 m event. At the 2012 Summer Olympics he was eliminated in the semi-finals of both the C-1 200 m and the C-1 1000 m events.
