= Asumi Ōmura =

Japanese sprint canoeist (born 1989)

Personal information
- Nationality: Japan
- Born: 11 November 1989 (age 36)
- Height: 1.67 m (5 ft 5 1/2 in)
- Weight: 62 kg (137 lb)

Sport
- Sport: Canoeing
- Event: Sprint canoe
- Club: Waseda University
- Coached by: Octavian Ispas
Medal record
Women's canoe sprint
Representing Japan
Asian Games
Silver medal – second place	2010 Guangzhou	K-2 500 m
Bronze medal – third place	2010 Guangzhou	K-4 500 m
Asian Championships
Silver medal – second place	2011 Tehran	K-1 500 m
Silver medal – second place	2011 Tehran	K-2 500 m
Silver medal – second place	2013 Samarkand	K-2 1000 m
Bronze medal – third place	2015 Palembang	K-2 500 m

Asumi Ōmura (大村明日美, Ōmura Asumi; born November 11, 1989) is a Japanese sprint canoeist, born in Shizuoka Prefecture. She won silver and bronze medal in the women's kayak doubles and four at the 2010 Asian Games in Guangzhou, China, respectively. Ōmura is also a member of the canoe and kayak team at Waseda University in Shinjuku, and is coached and trained by Octavian Ispas of Romania.

Ōmura represented Japan at the 2012 Summer Olympics in London, where she competed in the women's K-2 500 metres. Ōmura and her partner Shinobu Kitamoto failed to advance into the semi-finals, as they placed sixth in the second heat by approximately two seconds behind the Slovak pair Ivana Kmeťová and Martina Kohlová, with a time of 1:47.323.
