= Wang Feng (canoeist) =

Chinese canoeist

Medal record

Women's canoe sprint

Representing China

World Championships
Silver medal – second place	2007 Duisburg	K-4 1000 m
Bronze medal – third place	2006 Szeged	K-4 1000 m

Asian Championships
Gold medal – first place	2005 Putrajaya	K-4 200 m
Gold medal – first place	2005 Putrajaya	K-4 500 m
Gold medal – first place	2005 Putrajaya	K-4 1000 m
Gold medal – first place	2007 Hwacheon	K-4 200 m
Gold medal – first place	2007 Hwacheon	K-4 500 m
Gold medal – first place	2007 Hwacheon	K-4 1000 m

Wang Feng (Chinese: 王凤; born November 14, 1985, in Ya'an, Sichuan) is a Chinese sprint canoeist who has competed since the mid-2000s. She won two medals in the K-4 1000 m event at the ICF Canoe Sprint World Championships with a silver in 2007 and a bronze in 2006.

Wang also competed in the K-2 500 m event at the 2008 Summer Olympics in Beijing, but was eliminated in the heats.
