= Zhou Yu (canoeist) =

Chinese canoeist

Personal information
- Nationality: Chinese
- Born: 23 January 1989 (age 37) Liaoyang, Liaoning, China
- Height: 1.74 m (5 ft 8 1/2 in)
- Weight: 70 kg (154 lb)

Sport
- Sport: Canoeing
- Event: Sprint canoe
- Club: Hunan Sports Club
- Coached by: Wu Yubiao
Medal record
Women's canoe sprint
Representing China
World Championships
Bronze medal – third place	2015 Milan	K-1 500 m
Asian Games
Gold medal – first place	2010 Guangzhou	K-1 500 m
Silver medal – second place	2010 Guangzhou	K-1 200 m
Asian Championships
Gold medal – first place	2011 Tehran	K-1 200 m
Gold medal – first place	2011 Tehran	K-1 500 m
Gold medal – first place	2011 Tehran	K-4 500 m
Gold medal – first place	2013 Samarkand	K-1 500 m
Gold medal – first place	2013 Samarkand	K-1 1000 m
Gold medal – first place	2015 Palembang	K-1 500 m

Zhou Yu (Chinese: 周玉; pinyin: Zhōu Yù; born 23 January 1989) is a Chinese sprint canoeist. She won gold and silver medal in the women's kayak singles (both 200 and 500 m) at the 2010 Asian Games in Guangzhou, China. Zhou is also a member of Hunan Sports Club, there she is coached and trained by Wu Yubiao.

Zhou represented China at the 2012 Summer Olympics in London, where she competed in both the women's kayak singles and doubles. For her first event, the women's K-2 500 metres, Zhou and her partner Wu Yanan narrowly missed out of the Olympic medal in the A-final by nearly fourteen hundredths of a second (0.14) behind the Polish pair Karolina Naja and Beata Mikołajczyk, posting their time of 1:44.136. Three days later, Zhou barely advanced to the semi-final rounds of the first ever women's K-1 200 metres, after finishing sixth and attaining a qualified time of 42.885 seconds in the heats. Unfortunately, Zhou fell short in her bid for the final by seven hundredths of a second (0.07) behind Slovenia's Špela Ponomarenko, with a time of 42.279 seconds.
