= Irina Podoinikova =

Kazakhstani canoeist (born 1988)

Personal information
- Born: 28 June 1988 (age 38) Shymkent, Kazakh SSR, Soviet Union

Sport
- Sport: Canoe sprint
Medal record
Women's canoe sprint
Representing Kazakhstan
Asian Championships
| Gold medal – first place | 2013 Samarkand | K-4 500 m |
| Gold medal – first place | 2015 Palembang | K-2 200 m |
| Gold medal – first place | 2022 Rayong | K-4 500 m |
| Gold medal – first place | 2022 Rayong | K-4 1000 m |
| Gold medal – first place | 2025 Nanchang | K-2 500 m |
| Gold medal – first place | 2025 Nanchang | K-4 500 m |
| Silver medal – second place | 2009 Tehran | K-2 200 m |
| Silver medal – second place | 2009 Tehran | K-4 500 m |
| Silver medal – second place | 2009 Tehran | K-4 1000 m |
| Silver medal – second place | 2013 Samarkand | K-1 5000 m |
| Silver medal – second place | 2015 Palembang | K-2 500 m |
| Silver medal – second place | 2015 Palembang | K-4 500 m |
| Silver medal – second place | 2017 Shanghai | K-2 500 m |
| Silver medal – second place | 2017 Shanghai | K-4 200 m |
| Silver medal – second place | 2017 Shanghai | K-4 500 m |
| Silver medal – second place | 2017 Shanghai | K-4 1000 m |
| Silver medal – second place | 2022 Rayong | K-4 200 m |
| Bronze medal – third place | 2009 Tehran | K-2 5000 m |
| Bronze medal – third place | 2013 Samarkand | K-2 1000 m |
| Bronze medal – third place | 2017 Shanghai | K-1 200 m |
| Bronze medal – third place | 2017 Shanghai | K-2 200 m |
| Bronze medal – third place | 2022 Rayong | K-2 200 m |
| Bronze medal – third place | 2024 Tokyo | K-2 500 m |

Irina Podoinikova (Ирина Дмитриевна Подойникова, born 28 June 1988) is a Kazakhstani canoeist. She competed in the women's K-2 500 metres event at the 2016 Summer Olympics.
