= Shinobu Kitamoto =

Japanese canoeist

Medal record

Women's canoe sprint

Representing Japan

World Championships
Bronze medal – third place	2010 Poznań	K-1 200 m

Asian Championships
Gold medal – first place	2005 Putrajaya	K-2 200 m
Silver medal – second place	2005 Putrajaya	K-2 500 m
Silver medal – second place	2007 Hwacheon	K-1 200 m
Silver medal – second place	2007 Hwacheon	K-1 500 m
Silver medal – second place	2011 Tehran	K-1 200 m
Silver medal – second place	2011 Tehran	K-2 500 m
Bronze medal – third place	2005 Putrajaya	K-2 1000 m

Shinobu Kitamoto (北本 忍, Kitamoto Shinobu; born February 1, 1977) is a Japanese sprint canoer who has competed since the mid-2000s. She won a bronze medal in the K-1 200 m event at the 2010 ICF Canoe Sprint World Championships in Poznań, the first person from Japan to medal at the world championships.

Competing in three Summer Olympics (Athens 2004, Beijing 2008 and London 2012), Kitamoto earned her best finish of fifth in the K-2 500 m event at Beijing in 2008.

World Cup Racice 2010 k1 500m gold medal
