= Yu Lamei =

Chinese canoeist

Medal record

Women's canoe sprint

Representing China

World Championships
Silver medal – second place	2007 Dusiburg	K-4 1000 m
Bronze medal – third place	2006 Szeged	K-4 1000 m

Asian Championships
Gold medal – first place	2007 Hwacheon	K-4 200 m
Gold medal – first place	2007 Hwacheon	K-4 500 m
Gold medal – first place	2007 Hwacheon	K-4 1000 m
Gold medal – first place	2011 Tehran	K-2 1000 m
Gold medal – first place	2011 Tehran	K-4 500 m
Gold medal – first place	2013 Samarkand	K-2 200 m
Gold medal – first place	2013 Samarkand	K-2 500 m
Gold medal – first place	2013 Samarkand	K-2 1000 m

Yu Lamei (born January 15, 1983, in Jiaoliudao subdistrict, Wafangdian, Liaoning) is a Chinese sprint canoer who has competed since the late 2000s. She won two medals in the K-4 1000 m event at the ICF Canoe Sprint World Championships with a silver in 2007 and a bronze in 2006.

Yu also finished ninth in the K-4 500 m event at the 2008 Summer Olympics in Beijing.
