= Canoe sprint at the 2015 European Games – Men's C-1 200 metres =

Men's C-1 200 metres at the 2015 European Games
- Venue: Kur Sport and Rowing Centre, Mingachevir
- Date: 15–16 June
- Competitors: 20 from 20 nations
- Winning time: 40.064

Medalists
gold medal	Henrikas Žustautas	Lithuania
silver medal	Valentin Demyanenko	Azerbaijan
bronze medal	Martin Fuksa	Czech Republic

The men's C-1 200 metres canoe sprint competition at the 2015 European Games in Baku took place between 15 and 16 June at the Kur Sport and Rowing Centre in Mingachevir.

== Schedule ==
The schedule was as follows:

Date	Time	Round
Monday 15 June 2015	14:40	Heats
Monday 15 June 2015	16:30	Semifinals
Tuesday 16 June 2015	15:15	Finals

All times are Azerbaijan Summer Time (UTC+5)

== Results ==
=== Heats ===
Heat winners advanced directly to the A final. The next six fastest boats in each heat advanced to the semifinals.

==== Heat 1 ====
Rank	Kayaker	Country	Time	Notes
1	Hélder Silva	Portugal	39.248	QA, GB
2	Andrey Kraitor	Russia	39.337	QS
3	Yuriy Cheban	Ukraine	40.120	QS
4	Tomasz Kaczor	Poland	41.568	QS
5	Stefan Kiraj	Germany	41.689	QS
6	Andrzej Jezierski	Ireland	42.339	QS
7	Miķelis Ežmalis	Latvia	42.362	QS

==== Heat 2 ====
Rank	Kayaker	Country	Time	Notes
1	Valentin Demyanenko	Azerbaijan	38.978	QA, GB
2	Henrikas Žustautas	Lithuania	39.230	QS
3	Artsem Kozyr	Belarus	39.609	QS
4	Thomas Simart	France	40.211	QS
5	Chris Calvert	Great Britain	41.371	QS
6	Ľubomír Hagara	Slovakia	42.034	QS
7	Sergiu Craciun	Italy	42.066	QS

==== Heat 3 ====
Rank	Kayaker	Country	Time	Notes
1	Jonatán Hajdu	Hungary	39.315	QA
2	Alfonso Benavides	Spain	39.399	QS
3	Martin Fuksa	Czech Republic	39.778	QS
4	Zaza Nadiradze	Georgia	39.935	QS
5	Oleg Tarnovschi	Moldova	40.949	QS
6	Kerim Tenha	Turkey	46.840	QS

=== Semifinals ===
The fastest three boats in each semi advanced to the A final. The next four fastest boats in each semi, plus the fastest remaining boat advanced to the B final.

==== Semifinal 1 ====
Rank	Kayaker	Country	Time	Notes
1	Andrey Kraitor	Russia	38.540	QA, GB
2	Artsem Kozyr	Belarus	38.648	QA
3	Martin Fuksa	Czech Republic	38.658	QA
4	Zaza Nadiradze	Georgia	39.111	QB
5	Andrzej Jezierski	Ireland	40.277	QB
6	Chris Calvert	Great Britain	40.816	QB
7	Tomasz Kaczor	Poland	41.266	QB
8	Sergiu Craciun	Italy	44.784	
9	Kerim Tenha	Turkey	46.760	

==== Semifinal 2 ====
Rank	Kayaker	Country	Time	Notes
1	Henrikas Žustautas	Lithuania	38.737	QA
2	Thomas Simart	France	38.780	QA
3	Yuriy Cheban	Ukraine	38.790	QA
4	Alfonso Benavides	Spain	38.984	QB
5	Oleg Tarnovschi	Moldova	39.630	QB
6	Stefan Kiraj	Germany	40.012	QB
7	Miķelis Ežmalis	Latvia	40.547	QB
8	Ľubomír Hagara	Slovakia	40.695	qB

=== Finals ===
==== Final B ====
Competitors in this final raced for positions 10 to 18.

Rank	Kayaker	Country	Time
1	Alfonso Benavides	Spain	40.833
2	Zaza Nadiradze	Georgia	41.131
3	Stefan Kiraj	Germany	41.516
4	Andrzej Jezierski	Ireland	42.244
5	Oleg Tarnovschi	Moldova	42.473
6	Ľubomír Hagara	Slovakia	42.507
7	Tomasz Kaczor	Poland	42.962
8	Chris Calvert	Great Britain	43.341
9	Miķelis Ežmalis	Latvia	43.736

==== Final A ====
Competitors in this final raced for positions 1 to 9, with medals going to the top three.

Rank	Kayaker	Country	Time
1st place, gold medalist(s)	Henrikas Žustautas	Lithuania	40.064
2nd place, silver medalist(s)	Valentin Demyanenko	Azerbaijan	40.142
3rd place, bronze medalist(s)	Martin Fuksa	Czech Republic	40.188
4	Andrey Kraitor	Russia	40.199
5	Hélder Silva	Portugal	40.682
6	Artsem Kozyr	Belarus	40.719
7	Thomas Simart	France	40.745
8	Yuriy Cheban	Ukraine	41.036
9	Jonatán Hajdu	Hungary	41.192
