= Canoe sprint at the 2019 European Games – Men's C-1 200 metres =

Men's C-1 200 metres at the 2019 European Games
- Venue: Zaslavl Regatta Course
- Date: 26–27 June
- Competitors: 15 from 15 nations
- Winning time: 42.835

Medalists
gold medal	Artsem Kozyr	Belarus
silver medal	Nicolae Craciun	Italy
bronze medal	Alfonso Benavides	Spain

The men's C-1 200 metres canoe sprint competition at the 2019 European Games in Minsk took place between 26 and 27 June at the Zaslavl Regatta Course.

== Schedule ==
The schedule was as follows:

Date	Time	Round
Wednesday 26 June 2019	14:30	Heats
Wednesday 26 June 2019	16:20	Semifinal
Thursday 27 June 2019	14:30	Final

All times are Further-eastern European Time (UTC+3)

== Results ==
=== Heats ===
The fastest three boats in each heat advanced directly to the final. The next four fastest boats in each heat, plus the fastest remaining boat advanced to the semifinal.

==== Heat 1 ====
Rank	Canoeist	Country	Time	Notes
1	Zaza Nadiradze	Georgia	39.421	QF
2	Henrikas Žustautas	Lithuania	39.526	QF
3	Alfonso Benavides	Spain	39.969	QF
4	Michał Łubniewski	Poland	40.171	QS
5	Jonatán Hajdu	Hungary	40.456	QS
6	Thomas Simart	France	41.534	QS
7	Oleg Tarnovschi	Moldova	44.859	QS
8	Jan Vandrey	Germany	45.894	qS

==== Heat 2 ====
Rank	Canoeist	Country	Time	Notes
1	Hélder Silva	Portugal	40.128	QF
2	Ivan Shtyl	Russia	40.360	QF
3	Oleh Borovyk	Ukraine	40.580	QF
4	Artsem Kozyr	Belarus	40.636	QS
5	Martin Fuksa	Czech Republic	43.850	QS
6	Joosep Karlson	Estonia	43.955	QS
7	Nicolae Craciun	Italy	49.418	QS

=== Semifinal ===
The fastest three boats advanced to the final.

Rank	Canoeist	Country	Time	Notes
1	Artsem Kozyr	Belarus	39.657	QF
2	Michał Łubniewski	Poland	39.733	QF
3	Nicolae Craciun	Italy	39.894	QF
4	Jonatán Hajdu	Hungary	40.137	
5	Martin Fuksa	Czech Republic	40.324	
6	Jan Vandrey	Germany	40.607	
7	Oleg Tarnovschi	Moldova	42.247	
8	Thomas Simart	France	42.442	
9	Joosep Karlson	Estonia	43.177	

=== Final ===
Competitors in this final raced for positions 1 to 9, with medals going to the top three.

Rank	Canoeist	Country	Time
1st place, gold medalist(s)	Artsem Kozyr	Belarus	42.835
2nd place, silver medalist(s)	Nicolae Craciun	Italy	43.353
3rd place, bronze medalist(s)	Alfonso Benavides	Spain	44.255
4	Zaza Nadiradze	Georgia	44.955
5	Ivan Shtyl	Russia	45.623
6	Michał Łubniewski	Poland	45.900
7	Oleh Borovyk	Ukraine	46.080
8	Hélder Silva	Portugal	46.530
9	Henrikas Žustautas	Lithuania	46.703
