= Canoeing at the 2016 Summer Olympics – Men's C-1 200 metres =

Men's canoe sprint C-1 200 metres at the Games of the XXXI Olympiad
- Venue: Lagoa Stadium
- Date: 17–18 August
- Competitors: 25 from 25 nations
- Winning time: 39.279

Medalists
1st place, gold medalist(s)		Yuriy Cheban	Ukraine
2nd place, silver medalist(s)		Valentin Demyanenko	Azerbaijan
3rd place, bronze medalist(s)		Isaquias Queiroz	Brazil

The men's canoe sprint C-1 200 metres competition at the 2016 Olympic Games in Rio de Janeiro took place between 17 and 18 August at Lagoa Stadium.

The medals were presented by José Perurena López, IOC member, Spain and Tim Cornish, Board Member of the ICF.

It was the last appearance of the men's C-1 200 metres. The men's C-1 200 metres and men's K-2 200 metres were replaced with women's C-1 200 metres and women's C-2 500 metres as part of the Olympics' move towards gender equality.

== Format ==
The competition comprised heats, semifinals, and a final round. The leading five in each heat plus the fastest sixth place advanced to the semifinals. The top two from each of the three semifinals plus the two best third-place times advanced to the "A" final, and competed for medals. The next eight fastest advanced to the "B" final.

== Schedule ==
All times are Brasilia Time (UTC-03:00)

Date	Time	Round
Wednesday, 17 August 2016	09:16; 10:42	Heats; Semifinals
Thursday, 18 August 2016	09:16	Finals

== Results ==
=== Heats ===
The leading five in each heat plus the fastest sixth place advanced to the semifinals.

==== Heat 1 ====
Rank	Canoer	Country	Time	Notes
1	Alfonso Benavides	Spain	40.610	SF
2	Oleg Tarnovschi	Moldova	40.852	SF
3	Yuriy Cheban	Ukraine	41.220	SF
4	Zaza Nadiradze	Georgia	41.423	SF
5	Li Qiang	China	41.456	SF
6	Tomasz Kaczor	Poland	42.450	
7	Khaled Houcine	Tunisia	42.499	

==== Heat 2 ====
Rank	Canoer	Country	Time	Notes
1	Thomas Simart	France	40.415	SF
2	Isaquias Queiroz	Brazil	40.522	SF
3	Hélder Silva	Portugal	40.578	SF
4	Mark Oldershaw	Canada	40.972	SF
5	Dagnis Iļjins	Latvia	44.125	SF
6	Joaquim Lobo	Mozambique	44.949	

==== Heat 3 ====
Rank	Canoer	Country	Time	Notes
1	Andrey Kraitor	Russia	39.985	SF
2	Jonatán Hajdu	Hungary	40.147	SF
3	Martin Fuksa	Czech Republic	40.311	SF
4	Timur Khaidarov	Kazakhstan	40.492	SF
5	Stefan Kiraj	Germany	41.198	SF
6	Marcos Pulido	Mexico	41.910	SF

==== Heat 4 ====
Rank	Canoer	Country	Time	Notes
1	Valentin Demyanenko	Azerbaijan	39.749	SF
2	Henrikas Žustautas	Lithuania	40.048	SF
3	Carlo Tacchini	Italy	41.368	SF
4	Adel Mojallali	Iran	41.650	SF
5	Angel Kodinov	Bulgaria	42.694	SF
6	Ferenc Szekszárdi	Australia	44.292	

=== Semifinals ===
The top two from each of the semifinals plus the two best third-place times advanced to the "A" final. The next eight fastest advanced to the "B" final.

==== Semifinal 1 ====
Rank	Canoer	Country	Time	Notes
1	Isaquias Queiroz	Brazil	39.659	FA
2	Alfonso Benavides	Spain	40.038	FA
3	Li Qiang	China	40.066	FA
4	Martin Fuksa	Czech Republic	40.311	FB
5	Timur Khaidarov	Kazakhstan	41.079	FB
6	Henrikas Žustautas	Lithuania	41.187	FB
7	Angel Kodinov	Bulgaria	42.925	

==== Semifinal 2 ====
Rank	Canoer	Country	Time	Notes
1	Andrey Kraitor	Russia	40.394	FA
2	Thomas Simart	France	40.670	FA
3	Oleg Tarnovschi	Moldova	40.715	FB
4	Carlo Tacchini	Italy	41.468	FB
5	Marcos Pulido	Mexico	42.283	FB
6	Adel Mojallali	Iran	42.386	
7	Dagnis Iļjins	Latvia	45.082	

==== Semifinal 3 ====
Rank	Canoer	Country	Time	Notes
1	Zaza Nadiradze	Georgia	40.146	FA
2	Valentin Demyanenko	Azerbaijan	40.298	FA
3	Yuriy Cheban	Ukraine	40.590	FA
4	Jonatán Hajdu	Hungary	40.718	FB
5	Hélder Silva	Portugal	41.162	FB
6	Stefan Kiraj	Germany	43.171	
7	Mark Oldershaw	Canada	43.357	

=== Finals ===
==== Final B ====
Rank	Canoer	Country	Time	Notes
1	Martin Fuksa	Czech Republic	39.760	
2	Jonatán Hajdu	Hungary	39.811	
3	Henrikas Žustautas	Lithuania	40.230	
4	Oleg Tarnovschi	Moldova	40.280	
5	Hélder Silva	Portugal	40.388	
6	Timur Khaidarov	Kazakhstan	40.549	
7	Carlo Tacchini	Italy	40.733	
8	Marcos Pulido	Mexico	42.098	

==== Final A ====
Rank	Canoer	Country	Time	Notes
1st place, gold medalist(s)	Yuriy Cheban	Ukraine	39.279	OR
2nd place, silver medalist(s)	Valentin Demyanenko	Azerbaijan	39.493	
3rd place, bronze medalist(s)	Isaquias Queiroz	Brazil	39.628	
4	Alfonso Benavides	Spain	39.649	
5	Zaza Nadiradze	Georgia	39.817	
6	Andrey Kraitor	Russia	40.105	
7	Li Qiang	China	40.143	
8	Thomas Simart	France	40.180	
