= 2019 ICF Canoe Sprint World Championships – Men's C-1 200 metres =

Men's C-1 200 metres at the 2019 ICF Canoe Sprint World Championships
- Venue: Olympic Centre of Szeged
- Location: Szeged, Hungary
- Dates: 21–25 August
- Competitors: 32 from 32 nations
- Winning time: 39.36

Medalists
gold medal	Henrikas Žustautas	Lithuania
silver medal	Artsem Kozyr	Belarus
bronze medal	Zaza Nadiradze	Georgia

The men's C-1 200 metres competition at the 2019 ICF Canoe Sprint World Championships in Szeged took place at the Olympic Centre of Szeged.

== Schedule ==
The schedule was as follows:

Date	Time	Round
Wednesday 21 22 August 2019	16:50	Heats
Saturday 24 August 2019	16:30	Semifinals
Sunday 25 August 2019	10:10	Final B
Sunday 25 August 2019	12:37	Final A

All times are Central European Summer Time (UTC+2)

== Results ==
=== Heats ===
The six fastest boats in each heat, plus the three fastest seventh-place boats advanced to the semifinals.

==== Heat 1 ====
Rank	Canoeist	Country	Time	Notes
1	Artsem Kozyr	Belarus	39.16	QS
2	Tomasz Barniak	Poland	39.45	QS
3	Dan Drahokoupil	Czech Republic	39.52	QS
4	Manfred Pallinger	Austria	41.33	QS
5	Sunil Singh Salam	India	42.50	QS
6	Nadir Boukhari-Sardi	Algeria	46.85	QS
7	Leon Mussell	Cook Islands	1:02.77	

==== Heat 2 ====
Rank	Canoeist	Country	Time	Notes
1	Zaza Nadiradze	Georgia	38.63	QS
2	Adel Mojallali	Iran	39.07	QS
3	Lai Kuan-chieh	Chinese Taipei	39.58	QS
4	Nicolae Craciun	Italy	39.64	QS
5	Phanuphong Jiranarongchai	Thailand	40.93	QS
6	Joaquim Lobo	Mozambique	41.22	QS
7	Guillermo Quirino	Mexico	41.99	qS
8	Jasmin Klebić	Bosnia and Herzegovina	43.12	

==== Heat 3 ====
Rank	Canoeist	Country	Time	Notes
1	Timur Khaidarov	Kazakhstan	39.00	QS
2	Hélder Silva	Portugal	39.02	QS
3	Michael Müller	Germany	40.71	QS
4	Taras Mazovskyi	Ukraine	41.28	QS
5	Vladlen Denisov	Uzbekistan	41.96	QS
6	Chun Leng Tan	Singapore	43.00	QS
7	Manuel Antonio	Angola	46.03	qS
8	Dario Maksimovic	Luxembourg	46.67	
–	Gaona Grifa Beldin	Peru	DNS	

==== Heat 4 ====
Rank	Canoeist	Country	Time	Notes
1	Henrikas Žustautas	Lithuania	39.09	QS
2	Sete Benavides	Spain	39.22	QS
3	Dmitrii Sharov	Russia	39.78	QS
4	Jonatán Hajdu	Hungary	40.06	QS
5	Deniss Tihhomirov	Estonia	41.83	QS
6	Ghailene Khattali	Tunisia	42.38	QS
7	Roque Fernandes Dos Ramos	São Tomé and Príncipe	46.59	qS
–	Edwar Paredes	Venezuela	DSQ	

=== Semifinals ===
Qualification in each semi was as follows:

The fastest three boats advanced to the A final.
The next three fastest boats advanced to the B final.

==== Semifinal 1 ====
Rank	Canoeist	Country	Time	Notes
1	Henrikas Žustautas	Lithuania	38.49	QA
2	Zaza Nadiradze	Georgia	38.91	QA
3	Tomasz Barniak	Poland	40.35	QA
4	Taras Mazovskyi	Ukraine	40.82	QB
5	Michael Müller	Germany	40.83	QB
6	Guillermo Quirino	Mexico	41.80	QB
7	Joaquim Lobo	Mozambique	41.92	
8	Deniss Tihhomirov	Estonia	43.87	
9	Nadir Boukhari-Sardi	Algeria	47.69	

==== Semifinal 2 ====
Rank	Canoeist	Country	Time	Notes
1	Jonatán Hajdu	Hungary	39.97	QA
2	Sete Benavides	Spain	40.21	QA
3	Nicolae Craciun	Italy	40.24	QA
4	Timur Khaidarov	Kazakhstan	40.50	QB
5	Lai Kuan-chieh	Chinese Taipei	40.94	QB
6	Dan Drahokoupil	Czech Republic	41.82	QB
7	Chun Leng Tan	Singapore	43.31	
8	Sunil Singh Salam	India	43.69	
9	Manuel Antonio	Angola	47.97	

==== Semifinal 3 ====
Rank	Canoeist	Country	Time	Notes
1	Artsem Kozyr	Belarus	39.19	QA
2	Hélder Silva	Portugal	39.76	QA
3	Adel Mojallali	Iran	40.36	QA
4	Dmitrii Sharov	Russia	40.58	QB
5	Phanuphong Jiranarongchai	Thailand	41.85	QB
6	Vladlen Denisov	Uzbekistan	41.97	QB
7	Ghailene Khattali	Tunisia	43.32	
8	Manfred Pallinger	Austria	43.65	
–	Roque Fernandes Dos Ramos	São Tomé and Príncipe	DSQ	

=== Finals ===
==== Final B ====
Competitors in this final raced for positions 10 to 18.

Rank	Canoeist	Country	Time
1	Timur Khaidarov	Kazakhstan	42.08
2	Dmitrii Sharov	Russia	42.91
3	Lai Kuan-chieh	Chinese Taipei	42.99
4	Dan Drahokoupil	Czech Republic	43.43
5	Michael Müller	Germany	43.61
6	Taras Mazovskyi	Ukraine	44.06
7	Phanuphong Jiranarongchai	Thailand	44.81
8	Guillermo Quirino	Mexico	44.85
9	Vladlen Denisov	Uzbekistan	45.35

==== Final A ====
Competitors raced for positions 1 to 9, with medals going to the top three.

Rank	Canoeist	Country	Time
1st place, gold medalist(s)	Henrikas Žustautas	Lithuania	39.36
2nd place, silver medalist(s)	Artsem Kozyr	Belarus	40.08
3rd place, bronze medalist(s)	Zaza Nadiradze	Georgia	40.24
4	Sete Benavides	Spain	40.79
5	Jonatán Hajdu	Hungary	41.18
6	Adel Mojallali	Iran	41.30
7	Nicolae Craciun	Italy	41.34
8	Hélder Silva	Portugal	41.36
9	Tomasz Barniak	Poland	41.79
