= 2018 ICF Canoe Sprint World Championships – Men's C-1 200 metres =

Men's C-1 200 metres at the 2018 ICF Canoe Sprint World Championships
- Venue: Centro de Alto Rendimento de Montemor-o-Velho
- Location: Montemor-o-Velho, Portugal
- Dates: 25–26 August
- Competitors: 36 from 18 nations
- Winning time: 39.810

Medalists
gold medal	Artsem Kozyr	Belarus
silver medal	Ivan Shtyl	Russia
bronze medal	Henrikas Žustautas	Lithuania

The men's C-1 200 metres competition at the 2018 ICF Canoe Sprint World Championships in Montemor-o-Velho took place at the Centro de Alto Rendimento de Montemor-o-Velho.

== Schedule ==
The schedule was as follows:

Date	Time	Round
Saturday 25 August 2018	15:25	Heats
Sunday 26 August 2018	10:20	Semifinal
Sunday 26 August 2018	12:32	Final

All times are Western European Summer Time (UTC+1)

== Results ==
=== Heats ===
The fastest three boats in each heat advanced directly to the final. The next four fastest boats in each heat, plus the fastest remaining boat advanced to the semifinal.

==== Heat 1 ====
Rank	Canoeist	Country	Time	Notes
1	Artsem Kozyr	Belarus	42.336	QF
2	Henrikas Žustautas	Lithuania	42.373	QF
3	Hélder Silva	Portugal	42.449	QF
4	Dávid Korisánszky	Hungary	42.946	QS
5	Oleh Borovyk	Ukraine	43.009	QS
6	Dan Drahokoupil	Czech Republic	44.103	QS
7	Staņislavs Ļesčinskis	Latvia	45.290	QS
8	Joaquim Lobo	Mozambique	46.086	
9	Deniss Tihhomirov	Estonia	46.753	

==== Heat 2 ====
Rank	Canoeist	Country	Time	Notes
1	Ivan Shtyl	Russia	40.174	QF
2	Zaza Nadiradze	Georgia	40.780	QF
3	Stefan Kiraj	Germany	40.880	QF
4	Alberto Pedrero	Spain	41.184	QS
5	Wiktor Głazunow	Poland	42.097	QS
6	Adrien Bart	France	42.467	QS
7	Ryo Naganuma	Japan	44.030	QS
8	Marko Jelkić	Croatia	44.044	qS
9	Ghailene Khattali	Tunisia	44.940	

=== Semifinal ===
The fastest three boats advanced to the final.

Rank	Canoeist	Country	Time	Notes
1	Alberto Pedrero	Spain	39.798	QF
2	Dávid Korisánszky	Hungary	40.371	QF
3	Oleh Borovyk	Ukraine	40.504	QF
4	Wiktor Głazunow	Poland	40.558	
5	Adrien Bart	France	40.658	
6	Dan Drahokoupil	Czech Republic	41.204	
7	Staņislavs Ļesčinskis	Latvia	42.458	
8	Ryo Naganuma	Japan	42.891	
9	Marko Jelkić	Croatia	43.141	

=== Final ===
Competitors raced for positions 1 to 9, with medals going to the top three.

Rank	Canoeist	Country	Time
1st place, gold medalist(s)	Artsem Kozyr	Belarus	39.810
2nd place, silver medalist(s)	Ivan Shtyl	Russia	39.970
3rd place, bronze medalist(s)	Henrikas Žustautas	Lithuania	40.043
4	Zaza Nadiradze	Georgia	40.226
5	Stefan Kiraj	Germany	40.410
6	Hélder Silva	Portugal	40.503
7	Alberto Pedrero	Spain	40.826
8	Oleh Borovyk	Ukraine	41.306
9	Dávid Korisánszky	Hungary	41.510
