= 2017 ICF Canoe Sprint World Championships – Men's C-1 200 metres =

Men's C-1 200 metres at the 2017 ICF Canoe Sprint World Championships
- Venue: Sportcentrum Račice
- Location: Račice, Czech Republic
- Dates: 24–26 August
- Competitors: 20 from 20 nations
- Winning time: 38.161

Medalists
gold medal	Artsem Kozyr	Belarus
silver medal	Zaza Nadiradze	Georgia
bronze medal	Adel Mojallali	Iran

The men's C-1 200 metres competition at the 2017 ICF Canoe Sprint World Championships in Račice took place at the Sportcentrum Račice.

== Schedule ==
The schedule was as follows:

Date	Time	Round
Thursday 24 August 2017	10:42	Heats
Thursday 24 August 2017	17:05	Semifinals
Saturday 26 August 2017	09:54	Final B
Saturday 26 August 2017	11:28	Final A

All times are Central European Summer Time (UTC+2)

== Results ==
=== Heats ===
Heat winners advanced directly to the A final. The next six fastest boats in each heat advanced to the semifinals.

==== Heat 1 ====
Rank	Canoeist	Country	Time	Notes
1	Adel Mojallali	Iran	39.533	QA
2	Artsem Kozyr	Belarus	39.666	QS
3	Alfonso Benavides	Spain	40.005	QS
4	Michał Lubniewski	Poland	41.050	QS
5	Takayuki Kokaji	Japan	43.133	QS
6	Marc Tarling	Canada	43.794	QS
7	Marko Jelkić	Croatia	45.539	QS

==== Heat 2 ====
Rank	Canoeist	Country	Time	Notes
1	Alexey Korovashkov	Russia	39.807	QA
2	Timur Khaidarov	Kazakhstan	40.379	QS
3	Oleh Borovyk	Ukraine	41.090	QS
4	Choi Ji-sung	South Korea	44.024	QS
5	Jasmin Klebić	Bosnia and Herzegovina	45.535	QS
6	Ajit Kumar Sha	India	46.240	QS

==== Heat 3 ====
Rank	Canoeist	Country	Time	Notes
1	Zaza Nadiradze	Georgia	39.986	QA
2	Henrikas Žustautas	Lithuania	40.341	QS
3	Dan Drahokoupil	Czech Republic	42.247	QS
4	Jonatán Hajdu	Hungary	42.330	QS
5	Vadim Menkov	Uzbekistan	43.230	QS
6	Ian Ross	United States	45.003	QS
7	Ali Dherar Kadhim Al Dain	Iraq	45.103	QS

=== Semifinals ===
Qualification was as follows:

The fastest three boats in each semi advanced to the A final.
The next four fastest boats in each semi, plus the fastest remaining boat advanced to the B final.

==== Semifinal 1 ====
Rank	Canoeist	Country	Time	Notes
1	Jonatán Hajdu	Hungary	39.422	QA
2	Henrikas Žustautas	Lithuania	39.588	QA
3	Alfonso Benavides	Spain	39.849	QA
4	Oleh Borovyk	Ukraine	40.666	QB
5	Takayuki Kokaji	Japan	41.860	QB
6	Choi Ji-sung	South Korea	42.655	QB
7	Marc Tarling	Canada	43.744	QB
8	Ali Dherar Kadhim Al Dain	Iraq	44.199	qB
9	Ajit Kumar Sha	India	45.188	

==== Semifinal 2 ====
Rank	Canoeist	Country	Time	Notes
1	Artsem Kozyr	Belarus	39.127	QA
2	Timur Khaidarov	Kazakhstan	40.127	QA
3	Michał Lubniewski	Poland	40.327	QA
4	Dan Drahokoupil	Czech Republic	41.588	QB
5	Vadim Menkov	Uzbekistan	42.443	QB
6	Marko Jelkić	Croatia	44.288	QB
7	Jasmin Klebić	Bosnia and Herzegovina	45.188	QB
–	Ian Ross	United States	DNS	

=== Finals ===
==== Final B ====
Competitors in this final raced for positions 10 to 18.

Rank	Canoeist	Country	Time
1	Oleh Borovyk	Ukraine	40.388
2	Dan Drahokoupil	Czech Republic	41.400
3	Vadim Menkov	Uzbekistan	41.638
4	Takayuki Kokaji	Japan	42.050
5	Choi Ji-sung	South Korea	42.394
6	Marko Jelkić	Croatia	42.850
7	Marc Tarling	Canada	43.527
8	Jasmin Klebić	Bosnia and Herzegovina	44.100
9	Ali Dherar Kadhim Al Dain	Iraq	44.927

==== Final A ====
Competitors in this final raced for positions 1 to 9, with medals going to the top three.

Rank	Canoeist	Country	Time
1st place, gold medalist(s)	Artsem Kozyr	Belarus	38.161
2nd place, silver medalist(s)	Zaza Nadiradze	Georgia	38.439
3rd place, bronze medalist(s)	Adel Mojallali	Iran	38.605
4	Alexey Korovashkov	Russia	38.644
5	Timur Khaidarov	Kazakhstan	38.761
6	Jonatán Hajdu	Hungary	38.911
7	Henrikas Žustautas	Lithuania	39.083
8	Alfonso Benavides	Spain	39.150
9	Michał Lubniewski	Poland	39.428
