= 2024 ICF Canoe Sprint World Championships – Men's C-1 200 metres =

Men's C-1 200 metres at the 2024 ICF Canoe Sprint World Championships
- Venue: Rowing and Canoeing Race Course in Samarkand
- Location: Samarkand, Uzbekistan
- Dates: 24–25 August
- Competitors: 25 from 25 nations
- Winning time: 38.660

Medalists
gold medal	Oleksii Koliadych	Poland
silver medal	Pablo Graña	Spain
bronze medal	Zaza Nadiradze	Georgia

The men's C-1 200 metres competition at the 2024 ICF Canoe Sprint World Championships in Samarkand took place in Rowing and Canoeing Race Course in Samarkand.

== Schedule ==
The schedule is as follows:

Date	Time	Round
Saturday 24 August 2024	09:40	Heats
Saturday 24 August 2024	16:25	Semifinals
Sunday 25 August 2024	14:55	Final B
Sunday 25 August 2024	14:22	Final A

== Results ==
=== Heats ===
The fastest boat in each heat advanced directly to the final. The next six fastest boats in each heat advanced to the semifinal.

==== Heat 1 ====
Rank	Canoeist	Country	Time	Notes
1	Pablo Graña	Spain	39.408	QF
2	Oleksii Koliadych	Poland	40.453	QS
3	Cătălin Chirilă	Romania	41.346	QS
4	Eduard Strýček	Slovakia	42.425	QS
5	Jiří Minařík	Czech Republic	43.221	QS
6	Gyaneshwor Singh Philem	India	44.540	QS
7	Pasha Askerov	Azerbaijan	47.509	QS
8	Dario Maksimovic	Luxembourg	47.909	
9	Shuhei Hosumi	Japan	50.236	

==== Heat 2 ====
Rank	Canoeist	Country	Time	Notes
1	Artur Guliev	Uzbekistan	39.969	QF
2	Zaza Nadiradze	Georgia	40.159	QS
3	Stanislau Savelyeu	Individual Neutral Athletes	1:57.691	QS
4	Qu Xiangjie	China	42.192	QS
5	Hwang Seon-hong	South Korea	43.520	QS
6	Jonatán Hajdu	Hungary	44.443	QS
7	Štefo Lutz	Croatia	44.596	QS
8	Andrii Rybachok	Ukraine	47.604	
	Adel Mojallali	Iran	DNS	

==== Heat 3 ====
Rank	Canoeist	Country	Time	Notes
1	Sergey Svinarev	Individual Neutral Athletes	40.584	QF
2	Viktor Stepanov	Kazakhstan	40.966	QS
3	Ali Dherar Kadhim Aldain	Iraq	41.881	QS
4	Alejandro Rodríguez	Colombia	42.172	QS
5	Shahriyor Daminov	Tajikistan	42.815	QS
6	Ojay Fuentes	Philippines	43.690	QS
7	Vahe Davtyan	Armenia	46.325	QS
8	Huang Wei-jung	Chinese Taipei	48.274	
	Nico Pickert	Germany	DNS	

=== Semifinal ===
The fastest three boats in each semi advanced to the A final.
The next four fastest boats in each semi, plus the fastest remaining boat advanced to the final B.

==== Semifinal 1 ====
Rank	Canoeist	Country	Time	Notes
1	Oleksii Koliadych	Poland	39.794	QA
2	Stanislau Savelyeu	Individual Neutral Athletes	39.920	QA
3	Ali Dherar Kadhim Aldain	Iraq	40.518	QA
4	Eduard Strýček	Slovakia	41.119	QB
5	Alejandro Rodríguez	Colombia	41.566	QB
6	Štefo Lutz	Croatia	42.535	QB
7	Ojay Fuentes	Philippines	42.841	QB
8	Gyaneshwor Singh Philem	India	53.506	
9	Hwang Seon-hong	South Korea	DNF	

==== Semifinal 2 ====
Rank	Canoeist	Country	Time	Notes
1	Zaza Nadiradze	Georgia	40.066	QA
2	Cătălin Chirilă	Romania	40.296	QA
3	Jonatán Hajdu	Hungary	40.335	QA
4	Viktor Stepanov	Kazakhstan	40.714	QB
5	Jiří Minařík	Czech Republic	41.316	QB
6	Shahriyor Daminov	Tajikistan	42.542	QB
7	Qu Xiangjie	China	43.354	QB
8	Pasha Askerov	Azerbaijan	45.650	QB
9	Vahe Davtyan	Armenia	45.678	

=== Finals ===
==== Final B ====
Competitors in this final raced for positions 10 to 18.

Rank	Canoeist	Country	Time
1	Jiří Minařík	Czech Republic	40.819
2	Alejandro Rodríguez	Colombia	41.753
3	Viktor Stepanov	Kazakhstan	42.063
4	Eduard Strýček	Slovakia	42.185
5	Shahriyor Daminov	Tajikistan	42.867
6	Qu Xiangjie	China	42.890
7	Ojay Fuentes	Philippines	42.951
8	Pasha Askerov	Azerbaijan	48.406
	Štefo Lutz	Croatia	DNS

==== Final A ====
Competitors raced for positions 1 to 9, with medals going to the top three.

Rank	Canoeist	Country	Time
1st place, gold medalist(s)	Oleksii Koliadych	Poland	38.660
2nd place, silver medalist(s)	Pablo Graña	Spain	39.083
3rd place, bronze medalist(s)	Zaza Nadiradze	Georgia	39.180
4	Artur Guliev	Uzbekistan	39.345
5	Jonatán Hajdu	Hungary	39.461
6	Stanislau Savelyeu	Individual Neutral Athletes	39.603
7	Sergey Svinarev	Individual Neutral Athletes	39.925
8	Cătălin Chirilă	Romania	40.634
9	Ali Dherar Kadhim Aldain	Iraq	41.842
