= 2023 ICF Canoe Sprint World Championships – Men's C-1 200 metres =

Men's C-1 200 metres at the 2023 ICF Canoe Sprint World Championships
- Venue: Sportpark Duisburg
- Location: Duisburg, Germany
- Dates: 23–25 August
- Competitors: 26 from 26 nations
- Winning time: 38.729

Medalists
| gold medal | Artur Guliev | Uzbekistan |
| silver medal | Joan Antoni Moreno | Spain |
| bronze medal | Oleksii Koliadych | Poland |

The men's C-1 200 metres competition at the 2023 ICF Canoe Sprint World Championships in Duisburg took place in Sportpark Duisburg.

== Schedule ==
The schedule is as follows:

| Date | Time | Round |
|---|---|---|
| Wednesday 23 August 2023 | 09:00 | Heats |
| Friday 25 August 2023 | 11:00 | Semifinals |
| Friday 25 August 2023 | 17:00 | Final A |
| Friday 25 August 2023 | 18:44 | Final B |

== Results ==
=== Heats ===
The fastest six boats in each heat, plus the fastest three remaining boats, advanced to the semi-final.

==== Heat 1 ====
| Rank | Canoeist | Country | Time | Notes |
|---|---|---|---|---|
| 1 | Joan Antoni Moreno | Spain | 39.003 | QS |
| 2 | Stanislavs Lescinskis | Latvia | 41.994 | QS |
| 3 | Zaza Nadiradze | Georgia | 42.700 | QS |
| 4 | Ojay Fuentes | Philippines | 43.136 | QS |
| 5 | Ian Ross | United States | 43.487 | QS |
| 6 | Jasmin Klebić | Bosnia and Herzegovina | 44.112 | QS |
| 7 | Sidali Belaidi | Algeria | 47.050 | QS |
| | Norik Margaryan | Armenia | DNF | |

==== Heat 2 ====
| Rank | Canoeist | Country | Time | Notes |
|---|---|---|---|---|
| 1 | Mattia Alfonsi | Italy | 40.559 | QS |
| 2 | David Koczkas | Hungary | 41.281 | QS |
| 3 | Alejandro Rodríguez | Colombia | 41.447 | QS |
| 4 | Ali Aldain | Iraq | 41.587 | QS |
| 5 | Cristian Sola | Ecuador | 42.369 | QS |
| 6 | Umar Rustamov | Tajikistan | 43.045 | QS |
| 7 | Dario Maksimovic | Luxembourg | 45.872 | QS |

==== Heat 3 ====
| Rank | Canoeist | Country | Time | Notes |
|---|---|---|---|---|
| 1 | Oleksii Koliadych | Poland | 39.812 | QS |
| 2 | Oleh Borovyk | Ukraine | 40.779 | QS |
| 3 | Tyler Laidlaw | Canada | 41.147 | QS |
| 4 | Joaquim Lobo | Mozambique | 42.938 | QS |
| 5 | Sunil Singh Salam | India | 43.368 | QS |
| 6 | Domingos Pacavira | Angola | 45.935 | QS |
| | Luis Yasser Guerra | Venezuela | DNS | |

==== Heat 4 ====
| Rank | Canoeist | Country | Time | Notes |
|---|---|---|---|---|
| 1 | Artur Guliev | Uzbekistan | 39.088 | QS |
| 2 | Viktor Stepanov | Kazakhstan | 40.075 | QS |
| 3 | Peter Kretschmer | Germany | 40.211 | QS |
| 4 | Antonin Hrabal | Czech Republic | 40.442 | QS |
| 5 | Adel Mojallali | Iran | 41.147 | QS |
| 6 | Mihail Culceac | Moldova | 41.972 | QS |
| | Josephat Ngali | Kenya | DNS | |

=== Semifinal ===
The fastest three boats in each semi advanced to the A final.
The next three fastest boats in each semi advanced to the final B.

==== Semifinal 1 ====
| Rank | Canoeist | Country | Time | Notes |
|---|---|---|---|---|
| 1 | Joan Antoni Moreno | Spain | 39.949 | QA |
| 2 | Peter Kretschmer | Germany | 40.339 | QA |
| 3 | David Koczkas | Hungary | 40.582 | QA |
| 4 | Oleh Borovyk | Ukraine | 40.674 | QB |
| 5 | Antonin Hrabal | Czech Republic | 40.866 | QB |
| 6 | Sunil Singh Salam | India | 42.264 | QB |
| 7 | Umar Rustamov | Tajikistan | 43.366 | |
| 8 | Ian Ross | United States | 43.446 | |
| 9 | Dario Maksimovic | Luxembourg | 46.376 | |

==== Semifinal 2 ====
| Rank | Canoeist | Country | Time | Notes |
|---|---|---|---|---|
| 1 | Zaza Nadiradze | Georgia | 40.035 | QA |
| 2 | Viktor Stepanov | Kazakhstan | 40.122 | QA |
| 3 | Mattia Alfonsi | Italy | 40.539 | QA |
| 4 | Tyler Laidlaw | Canada | 41.337 | QB |
| 5 | Cristian Sola | Ecuador | 42.050 | QB |
| 6 | Mihail Culceac | Moldova | 42.259 | QB |
| 7 | Ojay Fuentes | Philippines | 43.390 | |
| 8 | Joaquim Lobo | Mozambique | 43.424 | |
| 9 | Sidali Belaidi | Algeria | 47.466 | |

==== Semifinal 3 ====
| Rank | Canoeist | Country | Time | Notes |
|---|---|---|---|---|
| 1 | Artur Guliev | Uzbekistan | 39.028 | QA |
| 2 | Oleksii Koliadych | Poland | 40.173 | QA |
| 3 | Ali Aldain | Iraq | 40.935 | QA |
| 4 | Adel Mojallali | Iran | 40.946 | QB |
| 5 | Alejandro Rodríguez | Colombia | 41.261 | QB |
| 6 | Stanislavs Lescinkis | Latvia | 41.834 | QB |
| 7 | Jasmin Klebić | Bosnia and Herzegovina | 43.373 | |
| 8 | Domingos Pacavira | Angola | 46.263 | |

=== Final B ===
Competitors in this final raced for positions 10 to 18.

| Rank | Canoeist | Country | Time |
|---|---|---|---|
| 1 | Oleh Borovyk | Ukraine | 41.482 |
| 2 | Antonin Hrabal | Czech Republic | 41.529 |
| 3 | Tyler Laidlaw | Canada | 41.955 |
| 4 | Mihail Culceac | Moldova | 42.118 |
| 5 | Alejandro Rodríguez | Colombia | 42.238 |
| 6 | Adel Mojallali | Iran | 42.564 |
| 7 | Cristian Sola | Ecuador | 42.582 |
| 8 | Stanislavs Lescinkis | Latvia | 43.462 |
| 9 | Sunil Singh Salam | India | 44.9666 |

=== Final A ===
Competitors raced for positions 1 to 9, with medals going to the top three.

| Rank | Canoeist | Country | Time |
|---|---|---|---|
| 1st place, gold medalist(s) | Artur Guliev | Uzbekistan | 38.729 |
| 2nd place, silver medalist(s) | Joan Antoni Moreno | Spain | 38.769 |
| 3rd place, bronze medalist(s) | Oleksii Koliadych | Poland | 39.046 |
| 4 | Zaza Nadiradze | Georgia | 39.552 |
| 5 | Viktor Stepanov | Kazakhstan | 39.836 |
| 6 | Ali Aldain | Iraq | 40.325 |
| 7 | Mattia Alfonsi | Italy | 40.355 |
| 8 | Peter Kretschmer | Germany | 40.365 |
| 9 | David Koczkas | Hungary | 40.836 |
