= Canoe sprint at the 2023 European Games – Men's C-1 200 metres =

Men's C-1 200 metres at the 2023 European Games
- Venue: Kryspinów Waterway
- Date: 22–23 June
- Competitors: 18 from 18 nations
- Winning time: 39.700

Medalists
gold medal	Henrikas Žustautas	Lithuania
silver medal	Zaza Nadiradze	Georgia
bronze medal	Pablo Graña	Spain

The men's C-1 200 metres canoe sprint competition at the 2023 European Games took place between 22 and 23 June at the Kryspinów Waterway.

== Schedule ==
The schedule was as follows:

Date	Time	Round
Thursday 22 June 2023	08:07	Heats
Thursday 22 June 2023	15:07	Semifinal
Friday 23 June 2023	14:04	Final

All times are UTC+2

== Results ==
=== Heats ===
The fastest three boats in each heat advanced directly to the final. The next four fastest boats in each heat, plus the fastest remaining boat advanced to the semifinal.

==== Heat 1 ====
Rank	Canoeist	Country	Time	Notes
1	Zaza Nadiradze	Georgia	39.266	QF
2	Henrikas Žustautas	Lithuania	39.712	QF
3	Jonatán Hajdu	Hungary	39.866	QF
4	Mattia Alfonsi	Italy	39.890	QS
5	Taras Mishchuk	Ukraine	40.016	QS
6	Nico Pickert	Germany	40.252	QS
7	Ilie Sprîncean	Romania	40.260	QS
8	Manfred Pallinger	Austria	41.584	qS
9	Resül Aydın	Turkey	43.392	

==== Heat 2 ====
Rank	Canoeist	Country	Time	Notes
1	Pablo Graña	Spain	39.519	QF
2	Oleksii Koliadych	Poland	39.707	QF
3	Serghei Tarnovschi	Moldova	40.107	QF
4	Peter Fuksa	Czech Republic	40.275	QS
5	Hélder Silva	Portugal	40.301	QS
6	Ansis Grišāns	Latvia	41.515	QS
7	Stefanos Dimopoulos	Greece	41.735	QS
8	Jasmin Klebić	Bosnia and Herzegovina	44.880	
9	Dario Maksimovic	Luxembourg	46.178	

=== Semifinal ===
The fastest three boats advanced to the final.

Rank	Canoeist	Country	Time	Notes
1	Mattia Alfonsi	Italy	40.928	QF
2	Ilie Sprîncean	Romania	40.956	QF
3	Hélder Silva	Portugal	40.990	QF
4	Taras Mishchuk	Ukraine	41.140	
5	Peter Fuksa	Czech Republic	41.146	
6	Nico Pickert	Germany	41.364	
7	Stefanos Dimopoulos	Greece	42.340	
8	Ansis Grišāns	Latvia	43.084	
9	Manfred Pallinger	Austria	44.010	

=== Final ===
Competitors in this final raced for positions 1 to 9, with medals going to the top three.

Rank	Canoeist	Country	Time
1st place, gold medalist(s)	Henrikas Žustautas	Lithuania	39.700
2nd place, silver medalist(s)	Zaza Nadiradze	Georgia	39.796
3rd place, bronze medalist(s)	Pablo Graña	Spain	39.852
4	Serghei Tarnovschi	Moldova	40.254
4	Oleksii Koliadych	Poland	40.254
6	Jonatán Hajdu	Hungary	40.594
7	Mattia Alfonsi	Italy	40.650
8	Ilie Sprîncean	Romania	41.052
9	Hélder Silva	Portugal	41.192
