= Canoeing at the 2022 Asian Games – Men's C-2 500 metres =

Men's C-2 500 metres at the 2022 Asian Games
- Venue: Fuyang Water Sports Centre
- Date: 30 September – 2 October 2023
- Competitors: 22 from 11 nations

Medalists
gold medal	Sergey Yemelyanov; Timur Khaidarov	Kazakhstan
silver medal	Masato Hashimoto; Ryo Naganuma	Japan
bronze medal	Adel Mojallali; Kia Eskandani	Iran

The men's sprint C-2 (canoe double) 500 metres competition at the 2022 Asian Games was held on 30 September and 2 October 2023.

== Schedule ==
All times are China Standard Time (UTC+08:00)

Date	Time	Event
Saturday, 30 September 2023	10:46	Heats
Saturday, 30 September 2023	15:46	Semifinal
Monday, 2 October 2023	11:45	Final

== Results ==
=== Heats ===
- Qualification: 1–3 → Final (QF), Rest → Semifinal (QS)

==== Heat 1 ====
Rank	Team	Time	Notes
1	Kazakhstan (KAZ); Sergey Yemelyanov; Timur Khaidarov	1:48.595	QF
2	Iran (IRI); Adel Mojallali; Kia Eskandani	1:53.096	QF
3	South Korea (KOR); Hwang Seon-hong; Kim Yi-yeol	1:53.470	QF
4	India (IND); Ribason Singh Ningthoujam; Gyaneshwor Singh Philem	1:54.829	QS
5	Philippines (PHI); John Paul Selencio; Ojay Fuentes	1:59.900	QS
6	Tajikistan (TJK); Mukhammadi Rajabov; Bobojon Bobojonov	2:03.159	QS

==== Heat 2 ====
Rank	Team	Time	Notes
1	Uzbekistan (UZB); Artur Guliev; Kamronbek Akhtamov	1:48.098	QF
2	Japan (JPN); Masato Hashimoto; Ryo Naganuma	1:48.569	QF
3	Thailand (THA); Mongkhonchai Sisong; Pitpiboon Mahawattanangkul	1:51.265	QF
4	Vietnam (VIE); Phạm Hồng Quân; Hiên Năm	1:52.899	QS
5	Indonesia (INA); Anwar Tarra; Rudiansyah	1:55.508	QS

=== Semifinal ===
- Qualification: 1–3 → Final (QF)

Rank	Team	Time	Notes
1	Vietnam (VIE); Phạm Hồng Quân; Hiên Năm	1:55.529	QF
2	Indonesia (INA); Anwar Tarra; Rudiansyah	1:55.535	QF
3	India (IND); Ribason Singh Ningthoujam; Gyaneshwor Singh Philem	1:57.225	QF
4	Philippines (PHI); John Paul Selencio; Ojay Fuentes	1:57.855	
5	Tajikistan (TJK); Mukhammadi Rajabov; Bobojon Bobojonov	2:00.870	

=== Final ===
Rank	Team	Time
1st place, gold medalist(s)	Kazakhstan (KAZ); Sergey Yemelyanov; Timur Khaidarov	1:49.010
2nd place, silver medalist(s)	Japan (JPN); Masato Hashimoto; Ryo Naganuma	1:49.237
3rd place, bronze medalist(s)	Iran (IRI); Adel Mojallali; Kia Eskandani	1:50.486
4	Uzbekistan (UZB); Artur Guliev; Kamronbek Akhtamov	1:50.514
5	South Korea (KOR); Hwang Seon-hong; Kim Yi-yeol	1:53.412
6	Thailand (THA); Mongkhonchai Sisong; Pitpiboon Mahawattanangkul	1:53.651
7	Vietnam (VIE); Phạm Hồng Quân; Hiên Năm	1:54.351
8	India (IND); Ribason Singh Ningthoujam; Gyaneshwor Singh Philem	1:54.723
9	Indonesia (INA); Anwar Tarra; Rudiansyah	1:55.408
