= 2022 ICF Canoe Sprint World Championships – Men's C-1 200 metres =

Men's C-1 200 metres at the 2022 ICF Canoe Sprint World Championships
- Venue: Lake Banook
- Location: Dartmouth, Canada
- Dates: 3–6 August
- Competitors: 15 from 15 nations
- Winning time: 39.25

Medalists
gold medal	Oleksii Koliadych	Poland
silver medal	Nico Pickert	Germany
bronze medal	Viktor Stepanov	Kazakhstan

The men's C-1 200 metres competition at the 2022 ICF Canoe Sprint World Championships in Dartmouth took place on Lake Banook.

== Schedule ==
The schedule is as follows:

Date	Time	Round
Wednesday 3 August 2022	10:25	Heats
Friday 5 August 2022	10:00	Semifinal
Saturday 6 August 2022	11:03	Final

== Results ==
=== Heats ===
The fastest three boats in each heat advanced directly to the final.
The next four fastest boats in each heat, plus the fastest remaining boat advanced to the semifinal.

==== Heat 1 ====
Rank	Canoeist	Country	Time	Notes
1	Oleksii Koliadych	Poland	41.02	QF
2	Alfonso Benavides	Spain	41.23	QF
3	Zaza Nadiradze	Georgia	41.25	QF
4	Petr Fuksa	Czech Republic	41.69	QS
5	Dávid Korisánszky	Hungary	41.85	QS
6	Edouard Beaumier	Canada	42.22	QS
7	Takanori Tome	Japan	42.91	QS
8	Michael Moses	Nigeria	46.42	qS

==== Heat 2 ====
Rank	Canoeist	Country	Time	Notes
1	Nico Pickert	Germany	40.88	QF
2	Oleh Borovyk	Ukraine	41.28	QF
3	Mattia Alfonsi	Italy	41.30	QF
4	Viktor Stepanov	Kazakhstan	41.42	QS
5	Alejandro Rodríguez	Colombia	41.99	QS
6	Oleg Nuţă	Romania	42.30	QS
7	Jonathan Grady	United States	45.80	QS

=== Semifinal ===
The fastest three boats advanced to the final.

Rank	Canoeist	Country	Time	Notes
1	Dávid Korisánszky	Hungary	42.51	QF
2	Viktor Stepanov	Kazakhstan	42.62	QF
3	Petr Fuksa	Czech Republic	42.65	QF
4	Oleg Nuţă	Romania	42.72	
5	Alejandro Rodríguez	Colombia	43.22	
6	Edouard Beaumier	Canada	43.57	
7	Takanori Tome	Japan	43.72	
8	Jonathan Grady	United States	46.37	
9	Michael Moses	Nigeria	49.41	

=== Final ===
Competitors raced for positions 1 to 9, with medals going to the top three.

Rank	Canoeist	Country	Time
1st place, gold medalist(s)	Oleksii Koliadych	Poland	39.25
2nd place, silver medalist(s)	Nico Pickert	Germany	39.35
3rd place, bronze medalist(s)	Viktor Stepanov	Kazakhstan	39.44
4	Alfonso Benavides	Spain	39.60
5	Zaza Nadiradze	Georgia	39.67
6	Petr Fuksa	Czech Republic	39.73
7	Mattia Alfonsi	Italy	39.86
8	Dávid Korisánszky	Hungary	40.18
9	Oleh Borovyk	Ukraine	40.20
