= 2025 ICF Canoe Sprint World Championships – Men's C-1 200 metres =

Men's C-1 200 metres at the 2025 ICF Canoe Sprint World Championships
- Venue: Idroscalo Regatta Course
- Location: Milan, Italy
- Dates: 20–22 August
- Competitors: 30 from 30 nations
- Winning time: 38.63

Medalists
| gold medal | Artur Guliev | Uzbekistan |
| silver medal | Pablo Graña | Spain |
| bronze medal | Sergey Svinarev | Individual Neutral Athletes |

The men's C-1 200 metres competition at the 2025 ICF Canoe Sprint World Championships in Milan took place in Idroscalo Regatta Course.

== Schedule ==
The schedule is as follows:

| Date | Time | Round |
|---|---|---|
| Wednesday 20 August 2025 | 11:11 | Heats |
| Thursday 21 August 2025 | 14:45 | Semifinals |
| Friday 22 August 2025 | 14:00 | Final B |
| Friday 22 August 2025 | 15:40 | Final A |

== Results ==
=== Heats ===
The fastest six fastest boats (QS) in each heat plus the fastest three remaining boats (qs), advanced to the semi-finals.

==== Heat 1 ====
| Rank | Canoeist | Country | Time | Notes |
|---|---|---|---|---|
| 1 | Mattia Alfonsi | Italy | 40.66 | QS |
| 2 | Preslav Georgiev | Bulgaria | 42.04 | QS |
| 3 | Kenneth Kasperbauer | United States | 42.13 | QS |
| 4 | Andrii Rybachok | Ukraine | 42.25 | QS |
| 5 | Ojay Fuentes | Philippines | 43.68 | QS |
| 6 | Jasmin Klebić | Bosnia and Herzegovina | 43.90 | QS |
| 7 | Dario Maksimovic | Luxembourg | 46.29 | qS |
| 8 | Arvind Verma | India | 47.30 | |

==== Heat 2 ====
| Rank | Canoeist | Country | Time | Notes |
|---|---|---|---|---|
| 1 | Pablo Graña | Spain | 39.57 | QS |
| 2 | Jonatán Hajdu | Hungary | 39.96 | QS |
| 3 | Antonin Hrabal | Czech Republic | 40.63 | QS |
| 4 | Pitpiboon Mahawattanangkul | Thailand | 42.03 | QS |
| 5 | Evans Monim | Indonesia | 42.71 | QS |
| 6 | Shungo Yoshida | Japan | 42.82 | QS |
| 7 | Shahriyor Daminov | Tajikistan | 42.92 | qS |
| 8 | Gevorg Pilosyan | Armenia | 43.98 | |

==== Heat 3 ====
| Rank | Canoeist | Country | Time | Notes |
|---|---|---|---|---|
| 1 | Artur Guliev | Uzbekistan | 39.52 | QS |
| 2 | Sergey Svinarev | Individual Neutral Athletes | 39.62 | QS |
| 3 | Oleksii Koliadych | Poland | 39.98 | QS |
| 4 | Gia Gabedava | Georgia | 41.08 | QS |
| 5 | Alejandro Rodríguez | Colombia | 41.58 | QS |
| 6 | Ali Dherar Kadhim Aldain | Iraq | 42.25 | QS |
| 7 | Oleg Tarnovschi | Moldova | 42.58 | qS |

==== Heat 4 ====
| Rank | Canoeist | Country | Time | Notes |
|---|---|---|---|---|
| 1 | Stanislau Savelyeu | Individual Neutral Athletes | 39.80 | QS |
| 2 | Sergey Yemelyanov | Kazakhstan | 40.36 | QS |
| 3 | David Töpel | Germany | 40.78 | QS |
| 4 | Yu Yuebinl | China | 41.04 | QS |
| 5 | Zachary Kralik | Canada | 41.88 | QS |
| 6 | Domingos Pacavira | Angola | 43.32 | QS |
| 7 | Hwang Seon-hong | South Korea | 48.44 | |

=== Semifinals ===
The fastest three boats in each semi advanced to the A final. The next three fastest boats in each semi advanced to the final B.

==== Semifinal 1 ====
| Rank | Canoeist | Country | Time | Notes |
|---|---|---|---|---|
| 1 | Sergey Svinarev | Individual Neutral Athletes | 40.03 | QA |
| 2 | Jonatán Hajdu | Hungary | 40.42 | QA |
| 3 | Yu Yuebin | China | 40.95 | QA |
| 4 | Mattia Alfonsi | Italy | 41.24 | QB |
| 5 | Oleg Tarnovschi | Moldova | 42.29 | QB |
| 6 | Alejandro Rodríguez | Colombia | 42.56 | QB |
| 7 | David Töpel | Germany | 42.97 | |
| 8 | Shungo Yoshida | Japan | 43.11 | |
| 9 | Ojay Fuentes | Philippines | 44.37 | |

==== Semifinal 2 ====
| Rank | Canoeist | Country | Time | Notes |
|---|---|---|---|---|
| 1 | Pablo Graña | Spain | 38.75 | QA |
| 2 | Oleksii Koliadych | Poland | 39.22 | QA |
| 3 | Sergey Yemelyanov | Kazakhstan | 39.31 | QA |
| 4 | Andrii Rybachok | Ukraine | 39.57 | QB |
| 5 | Gia Gabedava | Georgia | 39.76 | QB |
| 6 | Kenneth Kasperbauer | United States | 40.58 | QB |
| 7 | Evans Monim | Indonesia | 41.23 | |
| 8 | Shahriyor Daminov | Tajikistan | 42.04 | |
| 9 | Domingos Pacavira | Angola | 43.04 | |

==== Semifinal 3 ====
| Rank | Canoeist | Country | Time | Notes |
|---|---|---|---|---|
| 1 | Artur Guliev | Uzbekistan | 39.36 | QA |
| 2 | Stanislau Savelyeu | Individual Neutral Athletes | 39.85 | QA |
| 3 | Antonin Hrabal | Czech Republic | 40.98 | QA |
| 4 | Pitpiboon Mahawattanangkul | Thailand | 41.32 | QB |
| 5 | Ali Dherar Kadhim Aldain | Iraq | 41.54 | QB |
| 6 | Preslav Georgiev | Bulgaria | 41.78 | QB |
| 7 | Zachary Kralik | Canada | 42.03 | |
| 8 | Jasmin Klebić | Bosnia and Herzegovina | 43.74 | |
| 9 | Dario Maksimovic | Luxembourg | 45.13 | |

=== Finals ===
==== Final B ====
Competitors in this final raced for positions 10 to 18.

| Rank | Canoeist | Country | Time | Notes |
|---|---|---|---|---|
| 1 | Andrii Rybachok | Ukraine | 40.50 | |
| 2 | Gia Gabedava | Georgia | 40.65 | |
| 3 | Kenneth Kasperbauer | United States | 41.40 | |
| 4 | Oleg Tarnovschi | Moldova | 41.82 | |
| 5 | Ali Dherar Kadhim Aldain | Iraq | 41.87 | |
| 6 | Alejandro Rodríguez | Colombia | 41.89 | |
| 7 | Pitpiboon Mahawattanangkul | Thailand | 42.11 | |
| 8 | Preslav Georgiev | Bulgaria | 42.17 | |
| 9 | Mattia Alfonsi | Italy | 44.33 | |

==== Final A ====
Competitors raced for positions 1 to 9, with medals going to the top three.

| Rank | Canoeist | Country | Time | Notes |
|---|---|---|---|---|
| 1st place, gold medalist(s) | Artur Guliev | Uzbekistan | 38.63 | |
| 2nd place, silver medalist(s) | Pablo Graña | Spain | 38.66 | |
| 3rd place, bronze medalist(s) | Sergey Svinarev | Individual Neutral Athletes | 38.82 | |
| 4 | Oleksii Koliadych | Poland | 38.99 | |
| 5 | Jonatán Hajdu | Hungary | 39.25 | |
| 6 | Sergey Yemelyanov | Kazakhstan | 39.35 | |
| 7 | Stanislau Savelyeu | Individual Neutral Athletes | 39.89 | |
| 8 | Antonin Hrabal | Czech Republic | 39.91 | |
| 9 | Yu Yuebin | China | 40.28 | |
