= Pulido =

Pulido may refer to

- Pulido (surname)
- Pulido River, a river of Chile
- Hospital Pulido Valente in Lisbon, Portugal
- Jorge Enrique Pulido TV, a defunct Colombian TV program
