= 2026 ICF Canoe Sprint World Championships – Men's C-1 200 metres =

Men's C-1 200 metres at the 2026 ICF Canoe Sprint World Championships
- Location: Poznań, Poland
- Dates: 26–28 August
- Competitors: 32 from 32 nations
- Winning time: 40.95

Medalists
| gold medal | Oleksii Koliadych | Poland |
| silver medal | Artur Guliev | Uzbekistan |
| bronze medal | Andrei Zholabau | Individual Neutral Athletes |

The men's C-1 200 metres competition at the 2026 ICF Canoe Sprint World Championships in Poznań, Poland took place between 26 and 28 August 2026. The event was won by two time former champion (2022 and 2024), Poland's Oleksii Koliadych, holding off the 2023 and 2025 champion, Artur Guliev of Uzbekistan.

== Records ==
The world best time in the C-1 200 metres for men at the beginning of the competition was as follows:

Men's C-1 200 metres
| World Best | 37.44 | Vadim Korobov (LTU) | Plovdiv (Bulgaria) |

== Schedule ==
The schedule is as follows:

| Date | Time | Round |
|---|---|---|
| Wednesday 26 August 2026 | 11:11 | Heats |
| Thursday 27 August 2026 | 14:45 | Semifinals |
| Friday 28 August 2026 | 14:00 | Final B |
| Friday 28 August 2026 | 15:40 | Final A |

== Results ==
=== Heats ===
Four heats were held on morning of 26 August 2026.

Qualification rule : First six in each heat (SF) plus three next fastest (qBT) qualify for semi-finals; remainder are eliminated.

Heat 1

| Rank | Lane | Name(s) | Nation | Time | Behind | Notes |
|---|---|---|---|---|---|---|
| 1 | 5 | Pablo Graña | Spain | 41.92 | | SF |
| 2 | 3 | Aleksandre Tsivtsivadze | Georgia | 42.30 | 0.38 | SF |
| 3 | 7 | Sergey Yemelyanov | Kazakhstan | 42.66 | 0.74 | SF |
| 4 | 1 | Andrei Zholabau | Neutral Athletes B | 42.81 | 0.89 | SF |
| 5 | 6 | Nicolae Craciun | Italy | 42.92 | 1.00 | SF |
| 6 | 4 | Antonín Hrabal | Czech Republic | 43.59 | 1.67 | SF |
| 7 | 2 | Ali Dherar Kadhim Aldain | Iraq | 45.04 | 3.12 | qBT |
| 8 | 8 | Ifeanyi Okuchukwu | Nigeria | 50.91 | 8.99 | |

Heat 2

| Rank | Lane | Name(s) | Nation | Time | Behind | Notes |
|---|---|---|---|---|---|---|
| 1 | 5 | Gabriel Assunção | Brazil | 42.97 | | SF |
| 2 | 3 | Dávid Hodován | Hungary | 43.60 | 0.63 | SF |
| 3 | 4 | Nico Pickert | Germany | 43.84 | 0.87 | SF |
| 4 | 6 | Andrii Rybachok | Ukraine | 44.64 | 1.67 | SF |
| 5 | 2 | Gustavo Eslava | Mexico | 46.00 | 3.03 | SF |
| 6 | 1 | Staņislavs Leščinskis | Latvia | 46.59 | 3.62 | SF |
| 7 | 7 | Mohamed Gouda | Egypt | 48.86 | 5.89 | qBT |
| 8 | 8 | Mohamed Ali Merzougui | Algeria | 52.18 | 9.21 | |

Heat 3

| Rank | Lane | Name(s) | Nation | Time | Behind | Notes |
|---|---|---|---|---|---|---|
| 1 | 4 | Artur Guliev | Uzbekistan | 42.39 | | SF |
| 2 | 3 | Mihai Chihaia | Moldova | 43.00 | 0.61 | SF |
| 3 | 6 | Ilie Sprîncean | Romania | 43.25 | 0.86 | SF |
| 4 | 5 | Jian Xu | China | 44.25 | 1.86 | SF |
| 5 | 7 | Tsung Chen | Chinese Taipei | 44.26 | 1.87 | SF |
| 6 | 1 | Joaquim Lobo | Mozambique | 46.78 | 4.39 | SF |
| 7 | 8 | Dario Maksimović | Luxembourg | 49.44 | 7.05 | qBT |
| 8 | 2 | William Reyser Figueroa Del Aguila | Peru | 53.38 | 10.99 | |

Heat 4

| Rank | Lane | Name(s) | Nation | Time | Behind | Notes |
|---|---|---|---|---|---|---|
| 1 | 5 | Oleksii Koliadych | Poland | 42.38 | | SF |
| 2 | 4 | Sergey Svinarev | Neutral Athletes A | 44.14 | 1.76 | SF |
| 3 | 3 | Zachary Kralik | Canada | 44.50 | 2.12 | SF |
| 4 | 6 | Kenneth Kasperbauer | United States | 46.82 | 4.44 | SF |
| 5 | 2 | Sunil Singh Salam | India | 46.90 | 4.52 | SF |
| 6 | 7 | Domingos Pacavira | Angola | 47.54 | 5.16 | SF |
| 7 | 8 | Cristián Ávila | Colombia | 50.39 | 8.01 | |
| 0 | 1 | Bobojon Bobojonov | Tajikistan | DNS | | |

=== Semi finals ===
Three semi finals were held on morning of 27 August 2026.

Qualification rule : First three in each heat to A final (FA) next three in each heat to B final (FB); remainder are eliminated. (1-2 -> FA; 4-6 -> FB; 7... -> el.)

Semi final 1

| Rank | Lane | Name(s) | Nation | Time | Behind | Notes |
|---|---|---|---|---|---|---|
| 1 | 6 | Sergey Svinarev | Neutral Athletes A | 42.53 | | FA |
| 2 | 5 | Pablo Graña | Spain | 42.70 | +0.17 | FA |
| 3 | 3 | Ilie Sprîncean | Romania | 43.05 | +0.52 | FA |
| 4 | 4 | Dávid Hodován | Hungary | 43.25 | +0.72 | FB |
| 5 | 8 | Nicolae Craciun | Italy | 43.49 | +0.96 | FB |
| 6 | 7 | Jian Xu | China | 45.66 | +3.13 | FB |
| 7 | 1 | Staņislavs Leščinskis | Latvia | 46.17 | +3.64 | |
| 8 | 9 | Ali Dherar Kadhim Aldain | Iraq | 46.52 | +3.99 | |
| 9 | 2 | Sunil Singh Salam | India | 46.72 | +4.19 | |

Semi final 2

| Rank | Lane | Name(s) | Nation | Time | Behind | Notes |
|---|---|---|---|---|---|---|
| 1 | 5 | Gabriel Assunção | Brazil | 42.31 | | FA |
| 2 | 2 | Andrei Zholabau | Neutral Athletes B | 42.65 | +0.34 | FA |
| 3 | 6 | Sergey Yemelyanov | Kazakhstan | 42.99 | +0.68 | FA |
| 4 | 4 | Mihai Chihaia | Moldova | 43.37 | +1.06 | FB |
| 5 | 7 | Kenneth Kasperbauer | United States | 43.81 | +1.50 | FB |
| 6 | 8 | Gustavo Eslava | Mexico | 44.40 | +2.09 | FB |
| 7 | 3 | Zachary Kralik | Canada | 44.99 | +2.68 | |
| 8 | 9 | Joaquim Lobo | Mozambique | 46.62 | +4.31 | |
| 0 | 1 | Mohamed Gouda | Egypt | DNS | | |

Semi final 3

| Rank | Lane | Name(s) | Nation | Time | Behind | Notes |
|---|---|---|---|---|---|---|
| 1 | 4 | Oleksii Koliadych | Poland | 41.85 | | FA |
| 2 | 5 | Artur Guliev | Uzbekistan | 41.95 | 0.10 | FA |
| 3 | 6 | Aleksandre Tsivtsivadze | Georgia | 42.63 | 0.78 | FA |
| 4 | 7 | Andrii Rybachok | Ukraine | 43.14 | 1.29 | FB |
| 5 | 1 | Antonín Hrabal | Czech Republic | 43.94 | 2.09 | FB |
| 6 | 3 | Nico Pickert | Germany | 43.98 | 2.13 | FB |
| 7 | 2 | Tsung Chen | Chinese Taipei | 45.38 | 3.53 | |
| 8 | 8 | Domingos Pacavira | Angola | 46.41 | 4.56 | |
| 9 | 9 | Dario Maksimović | Luxembourg | 48.41 | 6.56 | |

=== Finals ===
The A and B finals were held on the afternoon of 28 August.

B Final

| Rank | Lane | Name(s) | Nation | Time | Behind | Notes |
|---|---|---|---|---|---|---|
| 1 | 8 | Nicolae Craciun | Italy | 44.05 | | |
| 2 | 4 | Dávid Hodován | Hungary | 44.19 | +0.14 | |
| 3 | 1 | Nico Pickert | Germany | 44.54 | +0.49 | |
| 4 | 6 | Andrii Rybachok | Ukraine | 44.96 | +0.91 | |
| 5 | 5 | Mihai Chihaia | Moldova | 45.36 | +1.31 | |
| 6 | 3 | Antonín Hrabal | Czech Republic | 45.51 | +1.46 | |
| 7 | 7 | Kenneth Kasperbauer | United States | 45.89 | +1.84 | |
| 8 | 9 | Jian Xu | China | 46.33 | +2.28 | |
| 9 | 2 | Gustavo Eslava | Mexico | 46.34 | +2.29 | |

A final

| Rank | Lane | Name(s) | Nation | Time | Behind | Notes |
|---|---|---|---|---|---|---|
| 1st place, gold medalist(s) | 4 | Oleksii Koliadych | Poland | 40.95 | | |
| 2nd place, silver medalist(s) | 7 | Artur Guliev | Uzbekistan | 41.05 | +0.10 | |
| 3rd place, bronze medalist(s) | 3 | Andrei Zholabau | Neutral Athlete B | 41.15 | +0.20 | |
| 4 | 5 | Gabriel Assunção | Brazil | 41.39 | +0.44 | |
| 5 | 2 | Pablo Graña | Spain | 41.51 | +0.56 | |
| 6 | 9 | Ilie Sprîncean | Romania | 41.80 | +0.85 | |
| 7 | 1 | Aleksandre Tsivtsivadze | Georgia | 42.06 | +1.11 | |
| 7 | 8 | Sergey Yemelyanov | Kazakhstan | 42.06 | +1.11 | |
| 9 | 6 | Sergey Svinarev | Neutral Athlete A | 42.42 | +1.47 | |
