= Canoeing at the 2013 Summer Universiade – Men's C1 200 metres =

The Men's C1 200 meters competition at the 2013 Summer Universiade in Kazan took place the Kazan Rowing Centre.

== Results ==
=== Heats ===
==== Heat 1 ====
Rank	Paddler	Country	Time	Notes
1	Andrey Kraitor	Russia	42.514	QF
2	Artsem Kozyr	Belarus	43.333	QF
3	Michal Lubniewski	Poland	43.775	QF
4	Vitalii Serikov	Tajikistan	45.312	QS
5	Tomas Baller	Hungary	46.028	QS
6	Djornes Anderle	Brazil	47.308	QS
7	Chin Chuen Tan	Singapore	50.078	QS

==== Heat 2 ====
Rank	Paddler	Country	Time	Notes
1	Jevgenij Suklin	Lithuania	41.609	QF
2	Martin Egermaier	Czech Republic	43.183	QF
3	Mirziyodjon Khojiev	Uzbekistan	43.381	QF
4	Kaito Nagai	Japan	43.396	QS
5	Bruno Afonso	Portugal	46.171	QS
6	Danil Khrapunov	Kyrgyzstan	46.625	QS
7	Armands Tanasjevs	Latvia	48.462	QS

=== Semifinal ===
Rank	Paddler	Country	Time	Notes
1	Kaito Nagai	Japan	43.373	QF
2	Tomas Baller	Hungary	44.940	QF
3	Vitalii Serikov	Tajikistan	45.091	QF
4	Bruno Afonso	Portugal	45.372	EL
5	Djornes Anderle	Brazil	46.073	EL
6	Danil Khrapunov	Kyrgyzstan	46.591	EL
7	Armands Tanasjevs	Latvia	47.576	EL
8	Chin Chuen Tan	Singapore	48.495	EL

=== Final ===
Rank	Paddler	Country	Time
1st place, gold medalist(s)	Jevgenij Suklin	Lithuania	38.950
2nd place, silver medalist(s)	Andrey Kraitor	Russia	39.128
3rd place, bronze medalist(s)	Artsem Kozyr	Belarus	40.401
4	Martin Egermaier	Czech Republic	41.060
5	Mirziyodjon Khojiev	Uzbekistan	41.344
6	Kaito Nagai	Japan	41.408
7	Michal Lubniewski	Poland	41.613
8	Tomas Baller	Hungary	43.549
9	Vitalii Serikov	Tajikistan	43.648
