= Simart =

Simart is a surname. Notable people with the surname include:

- Pierre-Charles Simart, French sculptor
- Thomas Simart (born 1987), French sprint canoeist
