= Hedieh Kazemi =

Iranian canoeing athlete

Personal information
- Nationality: Iranian
- Born: 5 July 1994 (age 32) Bandar Abbas, (Iran)

Sport
- Country: Iran
- Sport: Sprint Kayaking
Medal record
Representing Iran
Women's canoe sprint
International Tournament
Bronze medal – third place	2025 Hoff	K2 200 m]]
Silver medal – second place	2025 Hoff	K1 200 m]]
Silver medal – second place	2025 Hoff	K2 500 m]]
Deutsche Meisterschaften
Bronze medal – third place	2024 Brandenburg	K1 200 m]]
Asian Games
Silver medal – second place	2018 Jakarta	K1 500 m
Bronze medal – third place	2022 Hangzhou	K1 500 m
Asian Championships
Gold medal – first place	2017 Shanghai	K2 200 m
Gold medal – first place	2022 Rayong	K1 200 m
Gold medal – first place	2022 Rayong	K1 500 m
Silver medal – second place	2013 Samarkand	K1 500 m
Silver medal – second place	2017 Shanghai	K1 500 m
Silver medal – second place	2022 Rayong	K2 200 m
Silver medal – second place	2022 Rayong	K2 500 m
Bronze medal – third place	2013 Samarkand	K1 1000 m
Bronze medal – third place	2017 Shanghai	K4 200 m
Bronze medal – third place	2017 Shanghai	K4 1000 m

Hediye Kazemi (Persian: هدیه کاظمی ,born 5 July 1994 in Bandar Abbas) is an Iranian canoeing athlete.
