= Pulido (surname) =

Pulido is a Spanish surname. Notable people with the surname include:

- Alan Pulido, Mexican football player
- Alfonso Pulido (born 1957), American baseball player
- Ángel Pulido (1852–1932), Spanish physician, publicist and politician
- Armando Pulido (born 1989), Mexican football player
- Bonifacio López Pulido (1774–1827), Spanish priest of the Roman Catholic Church
- Brian Pulido (born 1961) creator, writer and producer of comic books and films
- Bobby Pulido (born 1971), American singer, songwriter, guitarist, and actor
- Bonifaci López y Pulido (1774–1827), Bishop of Urgell and Co-Prince of Andorra
- Carlos Pulido (born 1971), Venezuelan baseball player
- Cristian Pulido (born 1991), Colombian football player
- Daniela Pulido (born 2000), Mexican football player
- Héctor Pulido (1942–2022), Mexican football player
- Francisco Gonzalez-Pulido (born 1970), Mexican architect
- Guillermo Tell Villegas Pulido (1854–1949), Venezuelan lawyer, writer, journalist, and politician
- Javier Pulido (born 1970), Spanish comic book artist
- John Pulido (born 1981), Colombian football player
- Jorge Pulido (born 1991), Spanish football player
- Magdalena Pulido, Spanish film editor
- Maki Pulido, Filipino journalist
- Mark Pulido (born 1968), American politician
- Manuel Farrona-Pulido (born 1993), German football player
- Marcos Pulido (born 1995), Mexican canoeist
- Maria Claudia Pulido, Colombian lawyer
- María Dolores Pulido (born 1974), Spanish long-distance runner
- Mariano Pulido (1956–2013), Spanish football player
- Mercedes Pulido (1938–2016), Venezuelan politician, diplomat and social psychologist
- Miguel A. Pulido (born 1956), American politician and businessman
- Miguel Ángel Arellano Pulido (born 1952), Mexican politician
- Natalia Pulido (born 1969), Spanish swimmer
- Óscar Pulido (1906–1974), Mexican actor
- Pedro Puig Pulido (born 1932), Spanish chess master
- Pamela Pulido (born 1987), Mexican writer and screenwriter
- Rachel Pulido (born 1967), American television writer
- Rita Pulido (born 1945), Spanish swimmer
- Roberto Pulido (born 1950), American musician
- Rubén Pulido (footballer, born 1979) (born 1979), Spanish football player
- Valeria Pulido (born 1990), Mexican tennis player
- William Pulido (born 1965), Colombian racing cyclist
