= Iurii Cheban =

Ukrainian sprint canoeist

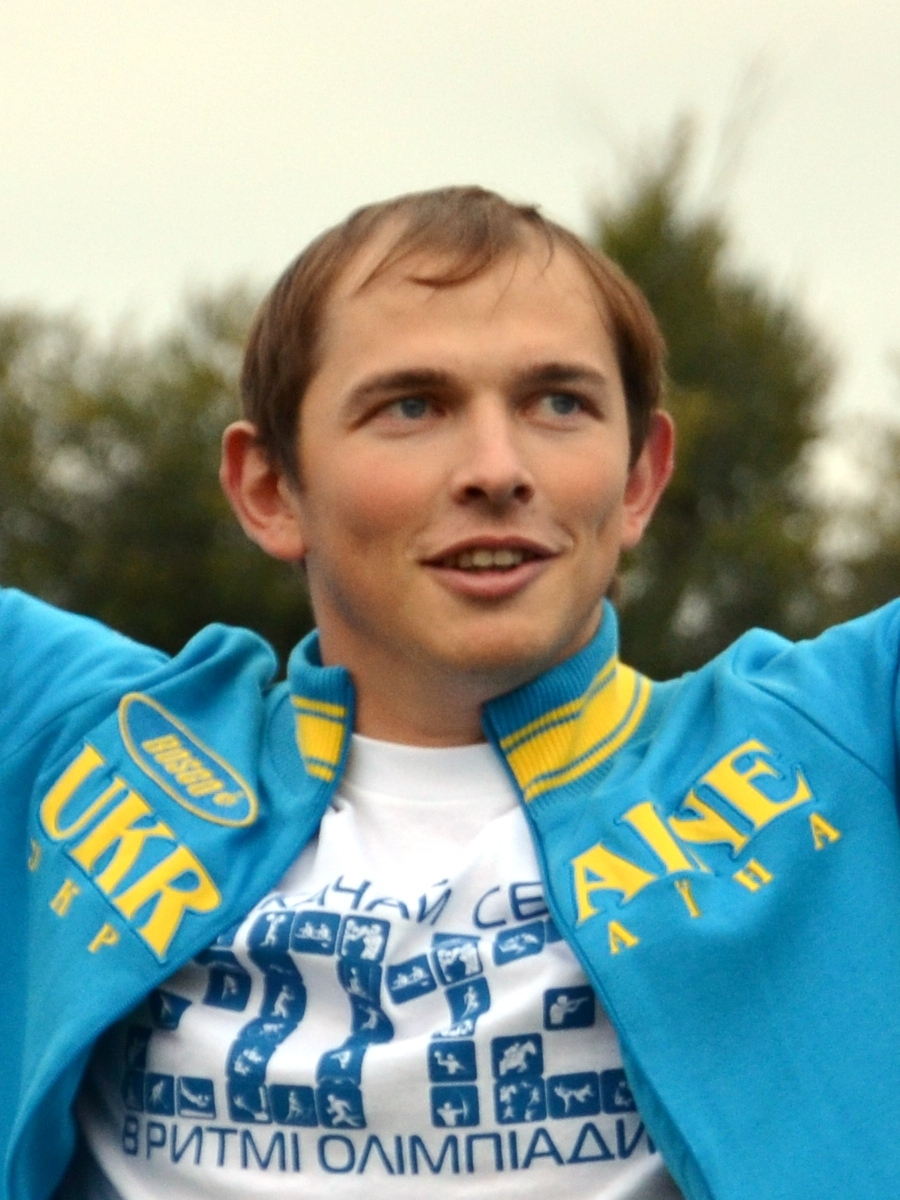
- Cheban in 2012

Personal information
- Born: 5 July 1986 (age 40) Odesa, Ukrainian SSR, Soviet Union
Medal record
Men's canoe sprint
Representing Ukraine
Olympic Games
| Gold medal – first place | 2012 London | C-1 200 m |
| Gold medal – first place | 2016 Rio de Janeiro | C-1 200 m |
| Bronze medal – third place | 2008 Beijing | C-1 500 m |
World Championships
| Gold medal – first place | 2007 Duisburg | C-1 200 m |
| Gold medal – first place | 2014 Moscow | C-1 200 m |
| Silver medal – second place | 2006 Szeged | C-1 500 m |
| Silver medal – second place | 2010 Poznań | C-1 4x200 m |
| Silver medal – second place | 2014 Moscow | C-1 4x200 m |
| Bronze medal – third place | 2010 Poznań | C-1 200 m |
European Championships
| Silver medal – second place | 2010 Trasona | C-1 200 m |
| Bronze medal – third place | 2006 Račice | C-1 500 m |
| Bronze medal – third place | 2007 Pontevedra | C-1 200 m |
| Bronze medal – third place | 2008 Milan | C-1 500 m |
| Bronze medal – third place | 2011 Belgrade | C-1 200 m |

Yuriy Volodymyrovych Cheban (Ukrainian: Юрій Володимирович Чебан; born 5 July 1986) is a retired Ukrainian sprint canoeist. He is the 2012 and 2016 Olympic champion in C-1 200 metres.

== Career ==
In 2003, despite being a year younger than many of his rivals, he was a world junior silver medallist at Komatsu, Japan in the Canadian canoe C-1 1000 m and also finished fourth in the C-1 500 m event. Having won the 2004 European Junior Championships at both the C-1 500 m and C-1 1000 m in Poznań, Poland, Cheban was selected to represent Ukraine in both C-1 events at the 2004 Summer Olympics.

Competing against much more experienced canoeists, he placed sixth in his initial heat of the C-1 500 m with a time of 2:00.238, qualifying for the semifinals. In the semifinal, he again placed sixth with a time of 1:53.385, and did not advance to the finals.

In C-1 1000 m, Cheban finished sixth in his heat with a time of 4:00.637. He was disqualified in the semifinal.

In 2005, Cheban and partner Petro Kruh won the European under-23 C-2 1000 m title in Plovdiv, Bulgaria. At the senior World Championships in Zagreb, Croatia they were the youngest of the C-2 1000 m finalists, placing ninth.

In 2006 Cheban returned to the individual C-1 event and it proved to be his most successful season yet. In July he took the C-1 500 m bronze medal at the 2006 European Championships in Račice, Czech Republic – his first senior medal. The following month he went one better, winning the silver medal at the World Championships in Szeged. Cheban would win gold in the C-1 200 m event at the 2007 championships in Duisburg.

He won a bronze medal in the C1 500m event at the 2008 Summer Olympics in Beijing. He is a member of the Pivdenne club.

At the 2010 championships, Cheban won two medals with a silver in the C-1 4 × 200 m and a bronze in the C-1 200 m (tied with Canada's Richard Dalton).

While at the 2012 Olympics in London, he won the C-1 200m event, beating his opponent Ivan Shtyl' from Russia. He succeeded in defending his title four years later at the 2016 Olympics, defeating his former teammate, Valentin Demyanenko, who competed for Azerbaijan.
