= 2022 Asian Canoe Sprint Championships =

Canoeing competition in Rayong, Thailand

- Host city: Rayong, Thailand
- Dates: 24–26 March 2022
- Main venue: RCAT Rowing and Canoeing Training Center

The 2022 Asian Canoe Sprint Championships were the 18th Asian Canoe Sprint Championships and took place from 24 to 26 March 2022 at the RCAT Rowing and Canoeing Training Center in Rayong, Thailand.

== Medal summary ==
=== Men ===
Event	Gold	Silver	Bronze
C-1 200 m	Adel Mojallali; Iran	Artur Guliev; Uzbekistan	Viktor Stepanov; Kazakhstan
C-1 500 m	Adel Mojallali; Iran	Lai Kuan-chieh; Chinese Taipei	Sergey Yemelyanov; Kazakhstan
C-1 1000 m	Mohammad Nabi Rezaei; Iran	Lai Kuan-chieh; Chinese Taipei	Nurislom Tukhtasin Ugli; Uzbekistan
C-2 200 m	Uzbekistan; Artur Guliev; Elyorjon Mamadaliev	Iran; Mohammad Nabi Rezaei; Adel Mojallali	Kazakhstan; Sergey Yemelyanov; Timofey Yemelyanov
C-2 500 m	Uzbekistan; Artur Guliev; Elyorjon Mamadaliev	Iran; Mohammad Nabi Rezaei; Adel Mojallali	Kazakhstan; Sergey Yemelyanov; Timofey Yemelyanov
C-2 1000 m	Iran; Adel Mojallali; Shahoo Nasseri	Kazakhstan; Sergey Yemelyanov; Timofey Yemelyanov	Uzbekistan; Vladlen Denisov; Gerasim Kochnev
C-4 200 m	Kazakhstan; Viktor Stepanov; Merey Medetov; Sergey Yemelyanov; Timofey Yemelyanov	Indonesia; Anwar Tarra; Yuda Firmansyah; Sofianto; Dedi Saputra	Uzbekistan; Artur Guliev; Elyorjon Mamadaliev; Gerasim Kochnev; Vladlen Denisov
C-4 500 m	Kazakhstan; Viktor Stepanov; Merey Medetov; Sergey Yemelyanov; Timofey Yemelyanov	Indonesia; Anwar Tarra; Yuda Firmansyah; Sofianto; Dedi Saputra	Thailand; Mongkhonchai Sisong; Wittaya Hongkaeo; Piyawat Chaithong; Pitpiboon Mahawattanangkul
C-4 1000 m	Kazakhstan; Anuar Almagambetov; Merey Medetov; Sergey Yemelyanov; Timofey Yemelyanov	Uzbekistan; Nurislom Tukhtasin Ugli; Elyorjon Mamadaliev; Artur Guliev; Vladlen Denisov	Indonesia; Muhammad Yunus Rustandi; Muhamad Burhan; Dedi Saputra; Sofianto
K-1 200 m	Denis Onufriev; Uzbekistan	Praison Buasamrong; Thailand	Pouria Sharifi; Iran
K-1 500 m	Praison Buasamrong; Thailand	Pouria Sharifi; Iran	Lin Yong-bo; Chinese Taipei
K-1 1000 m	Ali Aghamirzaei; Iran	Shakhriyor Makhkamov; Uzbekistan	Lin Yong-bo; Chinese Taipei
K-2 200 m	Iran; Ali Aghamirzaei; Sepehr Saatchi	Chinese Taipei; Weng Wen-sen; Lin Yung-chieh	Thailand; Aditep Srichart; Praison Buasamrong
K-2 500 m	Iran; Ali Aghamirzaei; Peyman Ghavidel	Kazakhstan; Ivan Lukyanov; Sergii Tokarnytskyi	Uzbekistan; Shakhriyor Makhkamov; Viliyam Ibragimov
K-2 1000 m	Kazakhstan; Kirill Tubayev; Alexandr Yemelyanov	Uzbekistan; Shokhrukhbek Azamov; Samandar Khaydarov	Iran; Amin Boudaghi; Peyman Ghavidel
K-4 200 m	Iran; Pouria Sharifi; Sepehr Saatchi; Ali Aghamirzaei; Amin Boudaghi	Uzbekistan; Samandar Khaydarov; Shakhriyor Makhkamov; Viliyam Ibragimov; Denis Onufriev	Kazakhstan; Ivan Lukyanov; Igor Ryashentsev; Sergii Tokarnytskyi; Artyom Terechshenko
K-4 500 m	Iran; Pouria Sharifi; Ali Aghamirzaei; Amin Boudaghi; Peyman Ghavidel	Uzbekistan; Samandar Khaydarov; Shakhriyor Makhkamov; Viliyam Ibragimov; Denis Onufriev	Indonesia; Maizir Riyondra; Mugi Harjito; Joko Andriyanto; Sutrisno
K-4 1000 m	Iran; Pouria Sharifi; Ali Aghamirzaei; Amin Boudaghi; Peyman Ghavidel	Uzbekistan; Shokhrukhbek Azamov; Samandar Khaydarov; Viliyam Ibragimov; Shakhriyor Makhkamov	Kazakhstan; Artyom Terechshenko; Igor Ryashentsev; Alexandr Yemelyanov; Kirill Tubayev

=== Women ===
Event	Gold	Silver	Bronze
C-1 200 m	Orasa Thiangkathok; Thailand	Dilnoza Rakhmatova; Uzbekistan	Margarita Torlopova; Kazakhstan
C-1 500 m	Orasa Thiangkathok; Thailand	Khamzoda Erkinova; Uzbekistan	Riska Andriyani; Indonesia
C-1 1000 m	Gulbakhor Fayzieva; Uzbekistan	Riska Andriyani; Indonesia	Gulzhaina Tynybekova; Kazakhstan
C-2 200 m	Indonesia; Nurmeni; Riska Andriyani	Kazakhstan; Olga Surmina; Margarita Torlopova	Thailand; Orasa Thiangkathok; Kewalin Takhianram
C-2 500 m	Uzbekistan; Gulbakhor Fayzieva; Nilufar Zokirova	Kazakhstan; Olga Surmina; Margarita Torlopova	Thailand; Orasa Thiangkathok; Kewalin Takhianram
C-4 200 m	Indonesia; Nurmeni; Riska Andriyani; Sella Monim; Dayumin	Kazakhstan; Gulzhaina Tynybekova; Ulyana Kiselyeva; Darya Korytkina; Olga Surmina	India; Namita Chandel; Kaveri Dimar; Anjali Bashishth; Shivani Verma
C-4 500 m	Kazakhstan; Gulzhaina Tynybekova; Ulyana Kiselyeva; Darya Korytkina; Olga Surmina	Indonesia; Riska Andriyani; Ratih; Devita Safitri; Sella Monim	Uzbekistan; Dilnoza Rakhmatova; Khamzoda Erkinova; Gulbakhor Fayzieva; Nilufar Zokirova
C-4 1000 m	Kazakhstan; Gulzhaina Tynybekova; Ulyana Kiselyeva; Darya Korytkina; Olga Surmina	Indonesia; Nurmeni; Ratih; Dayumin; Sella Monim	Thailand; Suthimon Chueathamdee; Nootchanat Thoongpong; Paweena Kamchon; Kewalin Takhianram
K-1 200 m	Hedieh Kazemi; Iran	Olga Shmelyova; Kazakhstan	Arina Tanatmisheva; Uzbekistan
K-1 500 m	Hedieh Kazemi; Iran	Olga Shmelyova; Kazakhstan	Arina Tanatmisheva; Uzbekistan
K-1 1000 m	Elnaz Shafieian; Iran	Ekaterina Shubina; Uzbekistan	Darya Petrova; Kazakhstan
K-2 200 m	Uzbekistan; Yuliya Borzova; Ekaterina Shubina	Iran; Elnaz Shafieian; Hedieh Kazemi	Kazakhstan; Anastassiya Berezovskaya; Irina Podoinikova
K-2 500 m	Kazakhstan; Olga Shmelyova; Tatyana Tokarnitskaya	Iran; Elnaz Shafieian; Hedieh Kazemi	Uzbekistan; Kamila Malakhova; Yuliya Borzova
K-2 1000 m	Kazakhstan; Tatyana Tokarnitskaya; Olga Shmelyova	Thailand; Kantida Nurun; Pornnapphan Phuangmaiming	Indonesia; Raudani Fitra; Cinta Priendtisca Nayomi
K-4 200 m	Uzbekistan; Kamila Malakhova; Yuliya Borzova; Ekaterina Shubina; Arina Tanatmisheva	Kazakhstan; Anastassiya Berezovskaya; Natalya Sergeyeva; Darya Petrova; Irina Podoinikova	Indonesia; Raudani Fitra; Cinta Priendtisca Nayomi; Nadia Hafiza; Ana Rahayu
K-4 500 m	Kazakhstan; Olga Shmelyova; Natalya Sergeyeva; Irina Podoinikova; Tatyana Tokarnitskaya	Uzbekistan; Kamila Malakhova; Yuliya Borzova; Ekaterina Shubina; Arina Tanatmisheva	Indonesia; Raudani Fitra; Cinta Priendtisca Nayomi; Nadia Hafiza; Ana Rahayu
K-4 1000 m	Kazakhstan; Tatyana Tokarnitskaya; Natalya Sergeyeva; Irina Podoinikova; Anastassiya Berezovskaya	Uzbekistan; Kamila Malakhova; Yuliya Borzova; Ekaterina Shubina; Arina Tanatmisheva	Indonesia; Raudani Fitra; Cinta Priendtisca Nayomi; Nadia Hafiza; Ana Rahayu

== Medal table ==
Rank	Nation	Gold	Silver	Bronze	Total
1	Iran	13	5	2	20
2	Kazakhstan	10	8	10	28
3	Uzbekistan	7	12	8	27
4	Thailand	3	2	5	10
5	Indonesia	2	5	7	14
6	Chinese Taipei	0	3	2	5
7	India	0	0	1	1
Totals (7 entries)		35	35	35	105
