= Arezoo Hakimi =

Iranian kayaker (born 1995)

Personal information
- Nationality: Persian
- Born: 18 April 1995 (age 31) Tehran, (Iran)
- Height: 171 cm (5 ft 7 in)
- Weight: 65 kg (143 lb)

Sport
- Country: Iran
- Sport: Sprint Kayaking
Medal record
Representing Iran
Women's canoe sprint
Asian Games
Bronze medal – third place	2014 Incheon	K1 200 m
Asian Championships
Gold medal – first place	2017 Shanghai	K2 200 m
Silver medal – second place	2017 Shanghai	K1 200 m
Bronze medal – third place	2017 Shanghai	K4 200 m
Bronze medal – third place	2017 Shanghai	K4 1000 m

Arezoo Hakimi Moghaddam (Persian: آرزو حکیمی مقدم; born in Hamedan, 18 April 1995) is an Iranian kayaker who was the youngest athlete in Iran team in 2012 Summer Olympics.
