= 2017 Asian Canoe Sprint Championships =

- Host city: Shanghai, China
- Dates: 15–18 October 2017

The 2017 Asian Canoe Sprint Championships were the 17th Asian Canoe Sprint Championships and took place from October 15–18, 2017 in Shanghai, China.

== Medal summary ==
=== Men ===
Event	Gold	Silver	Bronze
C-1 200 m	Timur Khaidarov; Kazakhstan	Adel Mojallali; Iran	Artur Guliev; Uzbekistan
C-1 1000 m	Vadim Menkov; Uzbekistan	Shahriyor Daminov; Tajikistan	Zheng Pengfei; China
C-2 200 m	Kazakhstan; Timur Khaidarov; Merey Medetov	Indonesia; Spens Stuber Mehue; Marjuki	Iran; Adel Mojallali; Ali Ojaghi
C-2 1000 m	Kazakhstan; Sergey Yemelyanov; Timofey Yemelyanov	China; Wang Hao; Guo Shengwei	Iran; Kia Eskandani; Ali Ojaghi
C-4 200 m	Kazakhstan; Sergey Yemelyanov; Timofey Yemelyanov; Mikhail Yemelyanov; Vladimir Petrov	Uzbekistan; Artur Guliev; Elyorjon Mamadaliev; Vadim Menkov; Serik Mirbekov	India; Gaurav Tomar; Sunil Singh Salam; Charan Singh; Jamesboy Singh
C-4 500 m	Kazakhstan; Sergey Yemelyanov; Timofey Yemelyanov; Mikhail Yemelyanov; Vladimir Petrov	Uzbekistan; Vadim Menkov; Elyorjon Mamadaliev; Gerasim Kochnev; Bekhzod Umaraliev	India; Gaurav Tomar; Sunil Singh Salam; Prakant Sharma; Jamesboy Singh
C-4 1000 m	Kazakhstan; Sergey Yemelyanov; Timofey Yemelyanov; Mikhail Yemelyanov; Vladimir Petrov	China; Wang Hao; Wang Longkui; Zheng Pengfei; Guo Shengwei	Uzbekistan; Vadim Menkov; Serik Mirbekov; Gerasim Kochnev; Bekhzod Umaraliev
K-1 200 m	Sergii Tokarnytskyi; Kazakhstan	Seiji Komatsu; Japan	Chu Youyong; China
K-1 1000 m	Aleksey Mochalov; Uzbekistan	Zhang Dong; China	Ali Aghamirzaei; Iran
K-2 200 m	Kazakhstan; Alexey Dergunov; Sergii Tokarnytskyi	Japan; Hiroki Fujishima; Momotaro Matsushita	China; Ji Kejun; Luan Haofeng
K-2 1000 m	Kazakhstan; Ilya Golendov; Andrey Yerguchyov	Iran; Farzin Asadi; Ahmad Reza Talebian	China; Wang Congkang; Zhang Dong
K-4 500 m	Kazakhstan; Ilya Golendov; Alexey Dergunov; Andrey Yerguchyov; Sergii Tokarnytskyi	Japan; Seiji Komatsu; Momotaro Matsushita; Hiroki Fujishima; Keiji Mizumoto	Uzbekistan; Aleksandr Tropin; Viliyam Ibragimov; Vyacheslav Gorn; Shakhriyor Makhkamov
K-4 1000 m	Uzbekistan; Aleksandr Tropin; Viliyam Ibragimov; Vyacheslav Gorn; Shakhriyor Makhkamov	China; Wang Congkang; Xu Peng; Zhang Dong; Zhou Zhiqiang	Kazakhstan; Daulet Sultanbekov; Ilya Golendov; Andrey Yerguchyov; Alexandr Yemelyanov

=== Women ===
Event	Gold	Silver	Bronze
C-1 200 m	Yulia Tsoy; Uzbekistan	Ko Haeng-bok; North Korea	Riska Andriyani; Indonesia
C-1 500 m	Ma Yanan; China	Trương Thị Phương; Vietnam	Riska Andriyani; Indonesia
C-2 200 m	Uzbekistan; Dilnoza Rakhmatova; Nilufar Zokirova	Indonesia; Dayumin; Nurmeni	Japan; Sayako Shimazu; Manaka Kubota
C-2 500 m	Indonesia; Dayumin; Nurmeni	Uzbekistan; Dilnoza Rakhmatova; Nilufar Zokirova	Vietnam; Trương Thị Phương; Nguyễn Thị Ngân
C-4 200 m	China; Zhang Luqi; Zhang Yajue; Lin Wenjun; Chen Wangting	North Korea; Ko Haeng-bok; O Un-a; Kim Su-hyang; Ho Su-jong	Vietnam; Trương Thị Phương; Lê Chung Thu; Trần Thị Lan; Nguyễn Thị Ngân
C-4 500 m	Japan; Sayako Shimazu; Manaka Kubota; Megumi Tsubota; Teruko Kiriake	North Korea; Ko Haeng-bok; O Un-a; Kim Su-hyang; Ho Su-jong	China; Li Qi; Wang Jing; Wu Yuting; Hong Shijun
K-1 200 m	Ma Qing; China	Arezoo Hakimi; Iran	Irina Podoinikova; Kazakhstan
K-1 500 m	Yang Luan; China	Hedieh Kazemi; Iran	Ekaterina Shubina; Uzbekistan
K-2 200 m	Iran; Arezoo Hakimi; Hedieh Kazemi	China; Ren Wenjun; Liu Haiping	Kazakhstan; Irina Podoinikova; Natalya Sergeyeva
K-2 500 m	China; Yang Jiali; Song Danni	Kazakhstan; Natalya Sergeyeva; Irina Podoinikova	Chinese Taipei; Liu Hui-chi; Chou Ju-chuan
K-4 200 m	China; Ren Wenjun; Li Dongyin; Ma Qing; Liu Haiping	Kazakhstan; Yekaterina Podstavochkina; Irina Podoinikova; Natalya Sergeyeva; Zoya Ananchenko	Iran; Mona Ebrahimi; Golnaz Ghazanfarian; Hedieh Kazemi; Arezoo Hakimi
K-4 500 m	China; Ren Wenjun; Li Dongyin; Ma Qing; Liu Haiping	Kazakhstan; Yekaterina Podstavochkina; Irina Podoinikova; Natalya Sergeyeva; Zoya Ananchenko	Chinese Taipei; Liu Hui-chi; Chen Hsin-shuang; Yan Siou-hua; Chou Ju-chuan
K-4 1000 m	China; Yang Jiali; Tian Shengfang; Song Danni; Sun Yuewen	Kazakhstan; Yekaterina Podstavochkina; Irina Podoinikova; Natalya Sergeyeva; Zoya Ananchenko	Iran; Mona Ebrahimi; Golnaz Ghazanfarian; Hedieh Kazemi; Arezoo Hakimi

== Medal table ==
Rank	Nation	Gold	Silver	Bronze	Total
1	Kazakhstan	10	4	3	17
2	China	8	5	5	18
3	Uzbekistan	5	3	4	12
4	Iran	1	4	5	10
5	Japan	1	3	1	5
6	Indonesia	1	2	2	5
7	North Korea	0	3	0	3
8	Vietnam	0	1	2	3
9	Tajikistan	0	1	0	1
10	Chinese Taipei	0	0	2	2
10	India	0	0	2	2
Totals (11 entries)		26	26	26	78
