= Artsem Kozyr =

Belarusian sprint canoeist

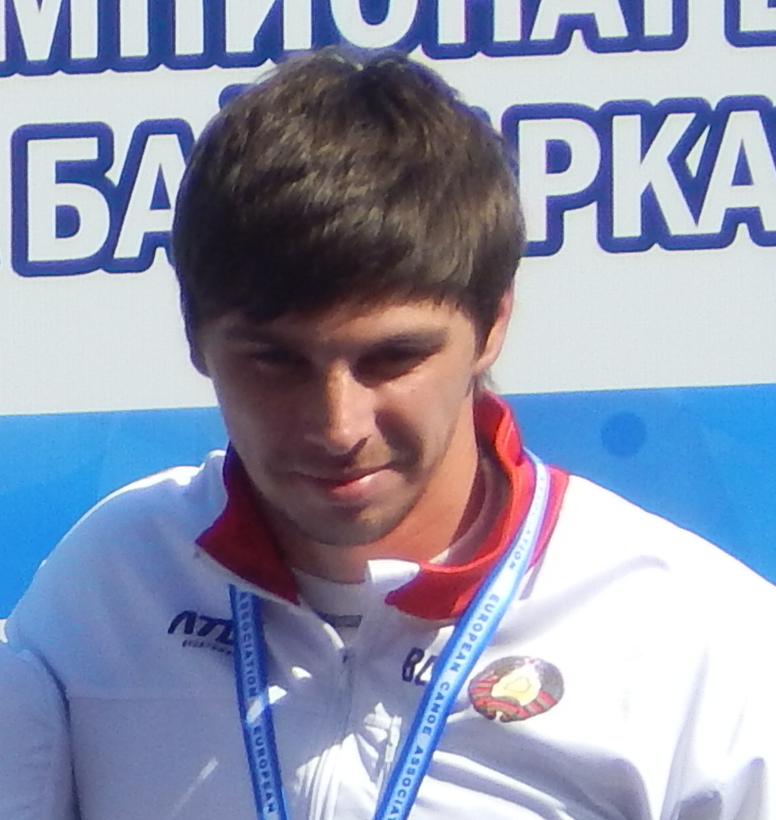

Personal information
- Nationality: Belarusian
- Born: 10 May 1990 (age 36) Minsk, Belarus
- Height: 1.86 m (6 ft 1 in)
- Weight: 91 kg (201 lb)

Sport
- Country: Belarus
- Sport: Sprint canoe
- Event: C-1 200 m
- Club: Sport Club of the Professional Unions of the Republic of Belarus
Medal record
Men's canoe sprint
Representing Belarus
World Championships
Gold medal – first place	2015 Milan	C-1 200 m
Gold medal – first place	2017 Račice	C-1 200 m
Gold medal – first place	2018 Montemor-o-Velho	C-1 200 m
Silver medal – second place	2019 Szeged	C-1 200 m
European Games
Gold medal – first place	2019 Minsk	C-1 200 m
European Championships
Silver medal – second place	2015 Račice	C-1 200 m
Silver medal – second place	2021 Poznań	C-1 200 m
Bronze medal – third place	2016 Moscow	C-1 200 m
Bronze medal – third place	2018 Belgrade	C-1 200 m
Universiade
Bronze medal – third place	2013 Kazan	C-1 200 m

Artsem Kozyr (born 10 May 1990) is a Belarusian sprint canoeist. He participated at the 2018 ICF Canoe Sprint World Championships.
