= Alberto Pedrero =

Spanish canoeist

Personal information
- Nationality: Spanish
- Born: 1995 (age 30–31) Madrid, Spain

Sport
- Country: Spain
- Sport: Sprint canoe
- Event: C–2 200 m
Medal record
Men's canoe sprint
Representing Spain
World Championships
Gold medal – first place	2019 Szeged	C-2 200 m
European Championships
Gold medal – first place	2021 Poznań	C-2 200 m

Hugo Alberto Pedrero (born 1995) is a Spanish sprint canoeist.

He won a gold medal at the 2019 ICF Canoe Sprint World Championships.
