= Pamela Pulido =

Mexican writer and screenwriter (born 1987)

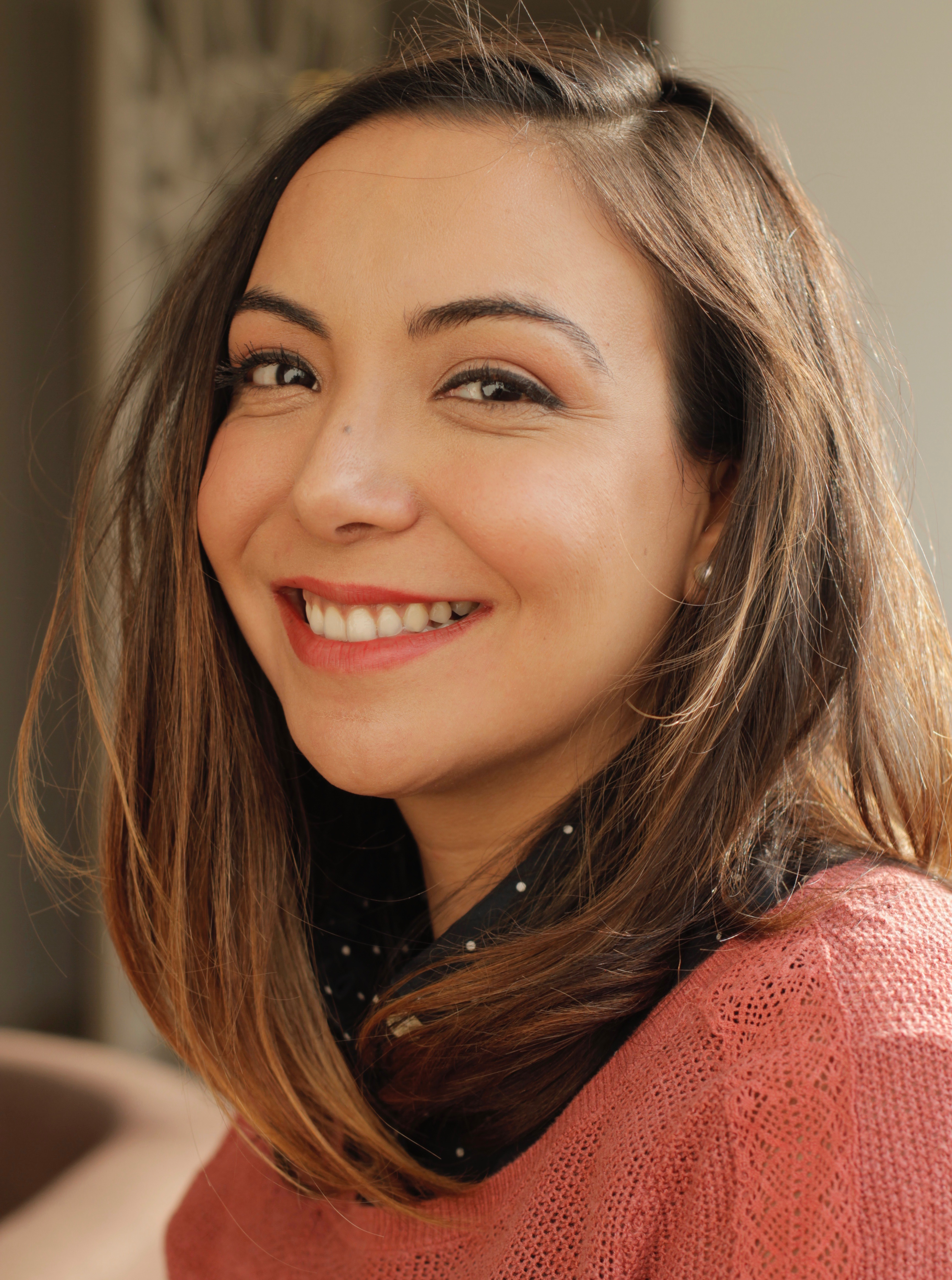

Sandra Pamela Pulido Ramírez (born 8 October 1987, Monterrey, Nuevo León) is a Mexican writer and screenwriter. She studied Communication Sciences at the Monterrey Institute of Technology and Higher Education (ITESM) Monterrey campus and later specialized in Cinema Screenplays at the Center for Cinematographic Training (CCC). She is the author of a children's book titled El Misterioso Aire Azul (2016).

== Work ==
- El Misterioso Aire Azul (2016)
