= Pablo Graña =

Spanish canoeist (born 1999)

Personal information
- Full name: Pablo Graña Alonso
- Nationality: Spanish
- Born: 21 March 1999 (age 27) Cangas del Morrazo, Spain

Sport
- Country: Spain
- Sport: Sprint canoe
- Event: C–2 200 m
Medal record
Men's canoe sprint
Representing Spain
World Championships
Gold medal – first place	2019 Szeged	C-2 200 m
Gold medal – first place	2022 Dartmouth	C-4 500 m
Gold medal – first place	2023 Duisburg	C-4 500 m
Silver medal – second place	2024 Samarkand	C-1 200 m
Silver medal – second place	2025 Milan	C-1 200 m
European Games
Gold medal – first place	2023 Kraków–Małopolska	C-2 Mix 200 m
Bronze medal – third place	2023 Kraków–Małopolska	C-1 200 m
European Championships
Gold medal – first place	2021 Poznań	C-2 200 m
Gold medal – first place	2025 Racice	C-1 200 m
Silver medal – second place	2022 Munich	C-1 200 m
Silver medal – second place	2024 Szeged	C-1 200 m
Silver medal – second place	2026 Montemor-o-Velho	C-1 200 m
Bronze medal – third place	2023 Kraków	C-1 200 m

Pablo Graña Alonso (Note: In this Spanish name, the first or paternal surname is Graña and the second or maternal family name is Alonso.) (born 21 March 1999) is a Spanish sprint canoeist.

He won a gold medal at the 2019 ICF Canoe Sprint World Championships.

== Major results ==
=== World championships ===
Year	C-1 200	C-2 200	C-4 500
2018			DSQ FA
2019		1st place, gold medalist(s)	
2022		—N/a	1st place, gold medalist(s)
2023		—N/a	1st place, gold medalist(s)
2024	2nd place, silver medalist(s)	—N/a	—N/a

=== European championships ===
Year	C-1 200	C-2 200	XC-2 200
2021		1st place, gold medalist(s)	—N/a
2022	2nd place, silver medalist(s)		—N/a
2023	3rd place, bronze medalist(s)	—N/a	1st place, gold medalist(s)
2024	2nd place, silver medalist(s)		—N/a
