= German Championship =

German Championships or German Championship may refer to:

- Bundesliga (football)
  - its predecessor, the German football championship
- Deutsche Rennsport Meisterschaft ("German Racing Championship")
- Deutsche Tourenwagen Meisterschaft ("German Touring Car Championship")
- East German rugby union championship
- German Amateur Championship (snooker)
- German amateur football championship
- German Athletics Championships
- German Bandy Championship
- German Chess Championship
- German Darts Championship
- German Figure Skating Championships
- German Formula Three Championship
- German Ice Hockey Championship
- German Individual Speedway Championship
- German Indoor Athletics Championships
- German Karting Championship
- German rugby union championship
- German Pro Championships (tennis)
- German Skeleton Championship
- German Speedway Championship
- German women's ice hockey Bundesliga
- Super Tourenwagen Cup (or German Supertouring Championship)
- Western German football championship
