= Oleksii Koliadych =

Polish sprint canoeist

Personal information
- Nationality: Polish
- Born: 27 February 1998 (age 28) Ukraine

Sport
- Country: Poland
- Sport: Sprint kayak
Medal record
Men's sprint kayak
Representing Poland
World Championships
Gold medal – first place	2022 Dartmouth	C-1 200 m
Gold medal – first place	2024 Samarkand	C-1 200 m
Gold medal – first place	2026 Poznań	C-1 200 m
Bronze medal – third place	2023 Duisburg	C-1 200 m
European Championships
Gold medal – first place	2024 Szeged	C-1 200 m
Silver medal – second place	2024 Szeged	C-2 200 m
Silver medal – second place	2025 Racice	C-1 200 m
Bronze medal – third place	2022 Munich	C-1 200 m

Oleksii Koliadych (Ukrainian: Олексій Колядич; born 27 February 1998) is a Ukrainian-born Polish sprint canoeist.

He comes from Kherson and moved to Poland in 2015. He has been representing Poland since 2017.

The greatest success in his senior career was a gold medal in the K-1 200 m at the 2022 World Championships. In the same year, he also won a bronze medal at the European Championships in Munich.

His club is KS Admira Gorzów Wielkopolski.

== Major results ==
=== World championships ===
Year	C-1 200	C-2 1000
2022	1st place, gold medalist(s)	
2023	3rd place, bronze medalist(s)	
2024	1st place, gold medalist(s)	DSQ H1

=== European championships ===
Year	C-1 200	C-2 200
2021	9	
2022	3rd place, bronze medalist(s)	
2023	4	—N/a
2024	1st place, gold medalist(s)	2nd place, silver medalist(s)
