= Stefan Kiraj =

German canoeist (born 1989)

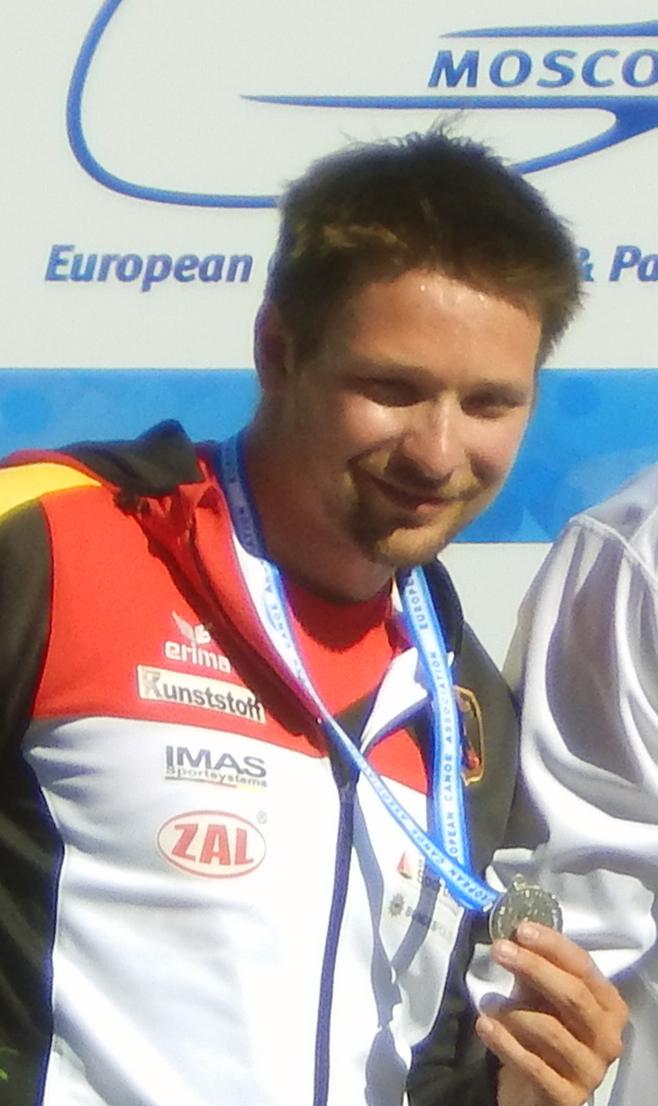

Personal information
- Nationality: German
- Born: 11 May 1989 (age 37) Spremberg, Bezirk Cottbus, East Germany
- Height: 189 cm (6 ft 2 in)
- Weight: 92 kg (203 lb)

Sport
- Sport: Canoe sprint
Medal record
Men's canoe sprint
Representing Germany
World Championships
Gold medal – first place	2017 Račice	C-4 1000 m
Silver medal – second place	2013 Duisburg	C-1 4×200 m
Bronze medal – third place	2011 Szeged	C-1 4×200 m
European Championships
Silver medal – second place	2016 Moscow	C-2 200 m

Stefan Kiraj (born 11 May 1989) is a German canoeist. He competed in the men's C-1 200 metres event at the 2016 Summer Olympics where he finished 6th in his semifinal and did not advance.
