= Artur Guliev =

Uzbekistani canoeist (born 1997)

Personal information
- Nationality: O'zbek
- Born: 5 August 1997 (age 29) Tashkent, Uzbekistan
- Height: 1.80 m (5 ft 11 in)

Sport
- Country: Uzbekistan
- Sport: Sprint canoe
- Event: C–2 200 m
Medal record
Men's canoe sprint
Representing Uzbekistan
World Championships
Gold medal – first place	2023 Duisburg	C-1 200 m
Gold medal – first place	2025 Milan	C-1 200 m
Silver medal – second place	2026 Poznań	C-1 200 m
Bronze medal – third place	2019 Szeged	C-2 200 m
Asian Games
Silver medal – second place	2018 Jakarta–Palembang	C-2 200 m
Silver medal – second place	2026 Aichi–Nagoya	C-2 500 m
Asian Championships
Gold medal – first place	2022 Rayong	C-2 200 m
Gold medal – first place	2022 Rayong	C-2 500 m
Silver medal – second place	2015 Palembang	C-1 200 m
Silver medal – second place	2017 Shanghai	C-4 200 m
Silver medal – second place	2022 Rayong	C-1 200 m
Silver medal – second place	2022 Rayong	C-4 1000 m
Bronze medal – third place	2017 Shanghai	C-1 200 m
Bronze medal – third place	2022 Rayong	C-4 200 m
Bronze medal – third place	2024 Tokyo	C-2 500 m

Artur Guliev (born 5 August 1997) is an Uzbek sprint canoeist.

He won a medal at the 2019 ICF Canoe Sprint World Championships.
