= Valentin Demyanenko =

Ukrainian-Azerbaijani canoeist

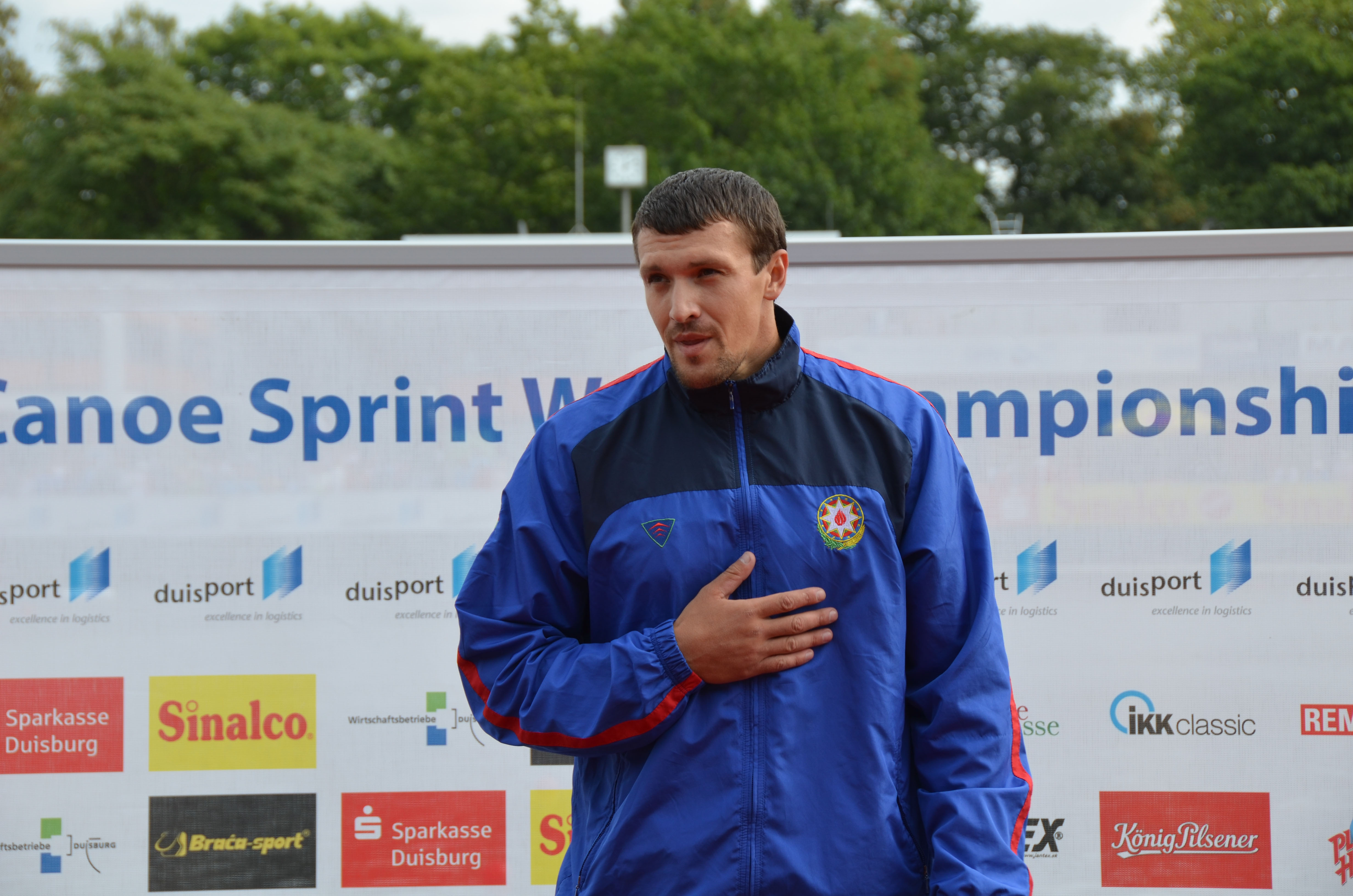
- Demyanenko at the 2013 World Championships

Personal information
- Nationality: Ukraine (until 2007); Azerbaijan (since 2007)
- Born: 23 October 1983 (age 42) Cherkasy, Ukrainian SSR, Soviet Union
Medal record
Men's sprint canoeing
Representing Ukraine
World Championships
Gold medal – first place	2005 Zagreb	C-1 200 m
Silver medal – second place	2006 Szeged	C-1 200 m
European Championships
Silver medal – second place	2005 Poznań	C-1 200 m
Representing Azerbaijan
Olympic Games
Silver medal – second place	2016 Rio de Janeiro	C-1 200 m
World Championships
Gold medal – first place	2009 Dartmouth	C-1 200 m
Gold medal – first place	2011 Szeged	C-1 200 m
Gold medal – first place	2013 Duisburg	C-1 200 m
Silver medal – second place	2011 Szeged	C-1 4 x 200 m
European Championships
Gold medal – first place	2009 Brandenburg	C-1 200 m
Gold medal – first place	2011 Belgrade	C-1 200 m
Gold medal – first place	2011 Belgrade	C-1 500 m
Silver medal – second place	2013 Montemor-o-Velho	C-1 200 m
European Games
Silver medal – second place	2015 Baku	C-1 200 m

Valentin Yuryevich Demyanenko (Ukrainian: Валенти́н Ю́рійович Дем'я́ненко, romanized: Valentyn Yuriyovych Demyanenko, Azerbaijani: Valentin Yuryeviç Demyanenko (Note: Russian spelling used in Azerbaijan: Valentin Yuryeviç Demyanenko (Latin script) (az), Iranian Azerbaijan: ﻭاﻝﻥﺕیﻥ يوريويچ ﺩﻡیاﻥﻥکﻭ (Perso-Arabic script) (azb) and Dagestan (Russia): Валентин Јурјевич Демјаненко (Cyrillic script).; Ukrainian spelling used in Azerbaijan: Valentın Yuriyovıç Demyanenko (Latin script), Iranian Azerbaijan: ﻭاﻝﻥﺕیﻥ يورىيوْويچ ﺩﻡیاﻥﻥکﻭ (Perso-Arabic script) and Dagestan (Russia): Валентын Јуријовыч Демјаненко (Cyrillic script).); born 23 October 1983) is a Ukrainian-born Azerbaijani former flatwater canoeist. He is a four times world champion, three times European champion and silver medalist of 2016 Summer Olympics in C-1 200 metres.

== Career ==
Demyanenko was a late developer as a canoeist and only came to prominence in 2004 with a shock victory in the C-1 500m final at the European under-23 championships in Poznań, Poland. His time of under 1:50 was comparable with those recorded by the finalists at the Athens Olympics.

In 2005 his coaches judged he was ready to take on the seniors but no one expected what was to follow. In his first international appearance as a senior he won a silver medal at the 2005 European championships in the C-1 200m sprint, just one tenth of a second behind the three-times champion Maxim Opalev of Russia.

The following month, at the 2005 Flatwater Racing World Championships at Zagreb, Croatia, he was entered in two events. In the C-1 500m he came fourth. Then in the C-1 200m final he turned the tables on Opalev, winning the final in a time of 39.264 seconds.

After these successes Demyanenko began to concentrate on the C1 500m in preparation for the 2008 Summer Olympics, where there would be no 200m races. He didn't appear at the 2006 European Senior Championships; instead he was entered for the under-23 championships in Schinias, Greece, where he won the C1 500m silver medal. At the senior World Championships in Szeged, Hungary, however he returned to the 200m distance to defend his title, finishing with the silver medal. In both events he was beaten by Russia's Nikolay Lipkin.
