= Marcos Pulido =

Mexican canoeist (born 1995)

Marcos Heliud Pulido Rodríguez
Personal information
- Nationality: Mexican
- Born: 18 August 1995 (age 29)
- Height: 1.80 m (5 ft 11 in)
- Weight: 82 kg (181 lb)

Sport
- Country: Mexico
- Sport: Canoeing

Marcos Heliud Pulido Rodríguez (born 18 August 1995) is a Mexican Olympic canoeist. He represented his country at the 2016 Summer Olympics.
