= Timur Khaidarov =

Kazakhstani canoeist (born 1996)

Personal information
- Born: 28 March 1996 (age 30) Tashkent, Uzbekistan
- Height: 1.85 m (6 ft 1 in)
- Weight: 86 kg (190 lb)

Sport
- Country: Kazakhstan
- Sport: Canoe sprint
Medal record
Men's canoe sprint
Representing Kazakhstan
Asian Championships
Gold medal – first place	2015 Palembang	C-1 200 m
Gold medal – first place	2017 Shanghai	C-1 200 m
Gold medal – first place	2017 Shanghai	C-2 200 m
Gold medal – first place	2024 Tokyo	C-2 500 m

Timur Khaidarov (Тимур Улугбекович Хайдаров, Timur Khaydarov, born 28 March 1996) is a Kazakhstani canoeist. He competed in the men's C-1 200 metres event at the 2016 Summer Olympics. Khaidarov also completed for Kazakhstan at the 2024 Summer Olympics in the men's C-2 500 metres event.
