= Adel Mojallali =

Iranian sprint canoeist

Personal information
- Nationality: Iranian
- Born: 21 March 1993 (age 33) Bandar Torkaman, Iran

Sport
- Country: Iran
- Sport: Canoe sprint
Medal record
Men's canoe sprint
Representing Iran
World Championships
| Bronze medal – third place | 2017 Račice | C-1 200 m |
Asian Games
| Bronze medal – third place | 2014 Incheon | C-1 200 m |
| Bronze medal – third place | 2022 Hangzhou | Men's C‐2 500m |
Asian Championships
| Gold medal – first place | 2011 Tehran | C-1 5000 m |
| Gold medal – first place | 2013 Samarkand | C-1 5000 m |
| Gold medal – first place | 2022 Rayong | C-1 200 m |
| Gold medal – first place | 2022 Rayong | C-1 500 m |
| Gold medal – first place | 2022 Rayong | C-2 1000 m |
| Silver medal – second place | 2017 Shanghai | C-1 200 m |
| Silver medal – second place | 2022 Rayong | C-2 200 m |
| Silver medal – second place | 2022 Rayong | C-2 500 m |
| Bronze medal – third place | 2013 Samarkand | C-1 1000 m |
| Bronze medal – third place | 2015 Palembang | C-1 200 m |
| Bronze medal – third place | 2017 Shanghai | C-2 200 m |

Adel Mojallali Moghaddam (Persian: عادل مجللی مقدم; born 21 March 1993) is an Iranian canoeist. He competed in the men's C-1 200 metres event at the 2016 Summer Olympics.

He won a bronze medal at the 2017 ICF Canoe Sprint World Championships becoming the first ever Iranian canoeist to win a medal at the ICF Canoe Sprint World Championships.
