= Henrikas Žustautas =

Lithuanian canoeist (born 1994)

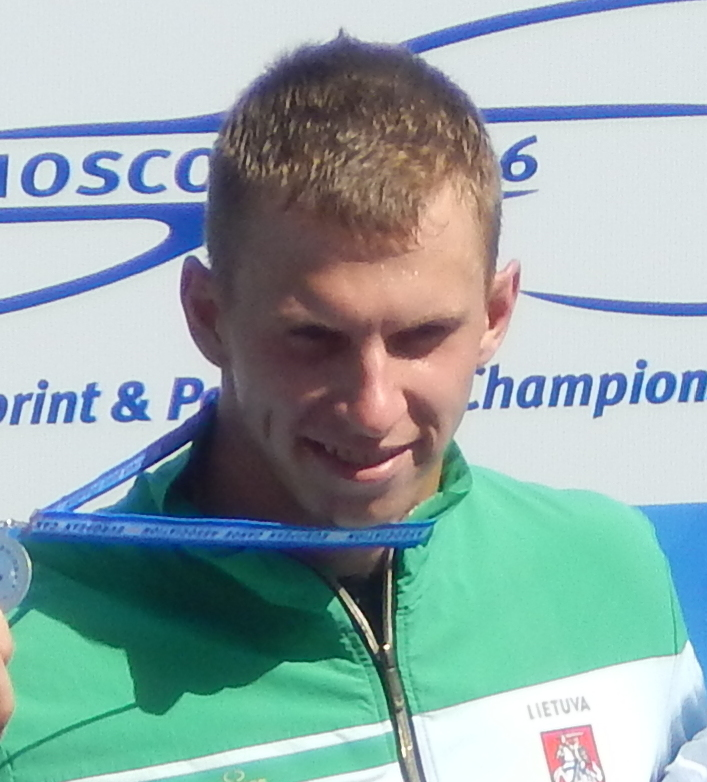
- Žustautas in 2016

Personal information
- Born: 13 July 1994 (age 32) Plungė, Lithuania
- Height: 1.92 m (6 ft 4 in)
- Weight: 96 kg (212 lb)

Sport
- Country: Lithuania
- Sport: Sprint canoe
- Event: C-1 200 m
Medal record
Men's sprint canoeing
Representing Lithuania
World Championships
Gold medal – first place	2019 Szeged	C-1 200 m
Bronze medal – third place	2018 Montemor-o-Velho	C-1 200 m
European Championships
Gold medal – first place	2017 Plovdiv	C-1 200 m
Gold medal – first place	2022 Munich	C-1 200 m
Gold medal – first place	2023 Kraków	C-1 200 m
Silver medal – second place	2016 Moscow	C-1 200 m
Silver medal – second place	2022 Munich	C-2 200 m
Bronze medal – third place	2021 Poznań	C-1 200 m
Bronze medal – third place	2021 Poznań	C-2 200 m
European Games
Gold medal – first place	2015 Baku	C-1 200 m
Gold medal – first place	2023 Kraków	C-1 200 m

Henrikas Žustautas (born 13 July 1994) is a Lithuanian sprint canoeist.

In 2015, Žustautas won a gold medal in the 2015 European Games for Lithuania in Canoe sprint.

He also competed for Lithuania at the 2016 Summer Olympics.
