= Andrey Kraitor =

Russian canoeist (born 1992)

Personal information
- Full name: Andrey Sergeyevich Kraitor
- Born: 5 November 1992 (age 33) Vilshanka, Vilshanka Raion, Kirovohrad Oblast, Ukraine
- Education: Volgograd State Academy of Physical Culture

Sport
- Country: Ukraine (until 2008); Azerbaijan (2009–2012); Russia (since 2013)
- Sport: canoe
Medal record
Men's canoe sprint
Representing Azerbaijan
World Championships
Silver medal – second place	2011 Szeged	C-1 4 x 200 m
Representing Russia
World Championships
Gold medal – first place	2013 Duisburg	C-1 4 x 200 m
Gold medal – first place	2014 Moscow	C-1 4 x 200 m
European Championships
Gold medal – first place	2015 Račice	C-1 200 m
Gold medal – first place	2016 Moscow	C-1 200 m
Bronze medal – third place	2013 Montemor-o-Velho	C-1 200 m
Bronze medal – third place	2016 Moscow	C-2 200 m
Summer Universiade
Gold medal – first place	2013 Kazan	C-1 4 x 200 m
Silver medal – second place	2013 Kazan	C-1 200 m

Andrey Sergeyvich Kraitor (Russian: Андрей Сергеевич Крайтор; born 5 November 1992) is a Russian sprint canoeist who has competed since the early 2000s. In the early period, he competed for Ukraine, from 2009 to 2012 for Azerbaijan. Since 2013, he has competed for Russia.

== Biography ==
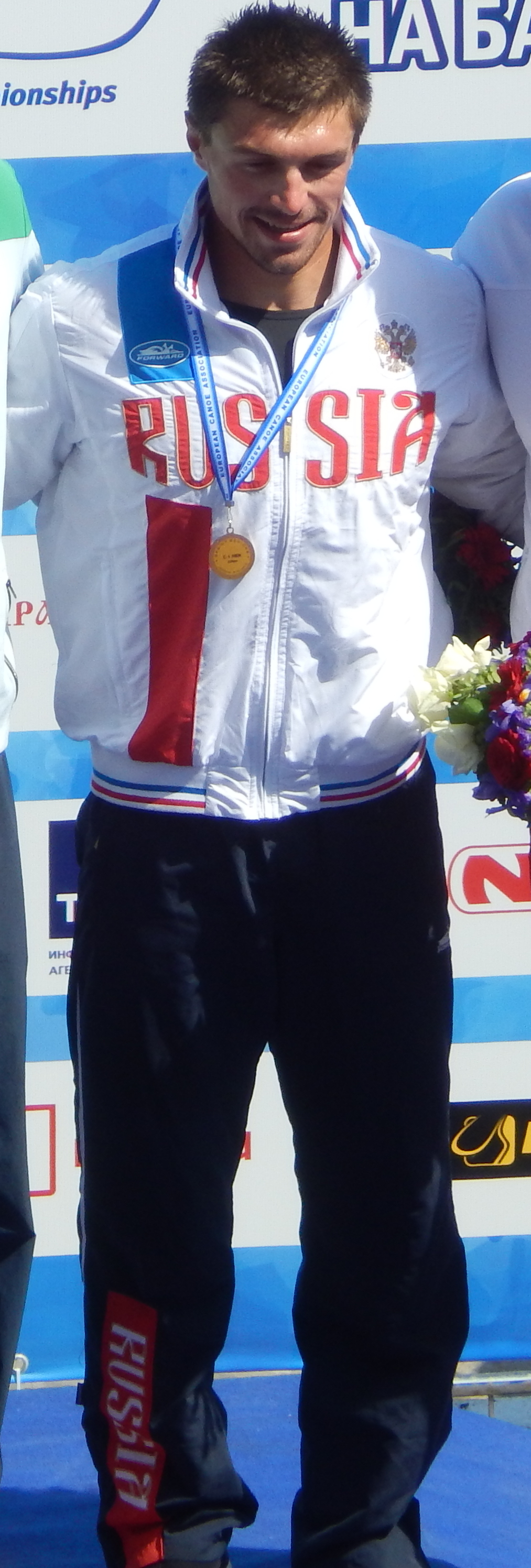
Andrey Krator

Andrey Kraitor was born 5 November 1992 in Vilshanka, Vilshanka Raion, Kirovohrad Oblast, Ukraine. He started canoeing at age seven and was coached by his father Sergey Petrovich, Master of Sports of USSR and Ukraine. His first notable success was in 2001, winning the bronze medal at the "Honour" tournament in Kyiv in the 200 m.

Together with other Ukrainian sportsmen in 2009, Kraitor decided to receive Azerbaijan citizenship to compete for the Azerbaijan team. After that, he won at World Junior Championships. At the 2011 ICF Canoe Sprint World Championships, he won gold in 4 × 200 m. In the autumn of 2012, he did not extend his contract with Azerbaijan, and in 2013 received Russian citizenship.

His new coaches were Merited Coach Vladimir Marchenko and Russian canoeist Maksim Opalev. He won several Russian cups and Junior Championships and was successful at the 2013 Summer Universiade in Kazan, Russia. His most notable achievements as a Russian sportsman were two gold medals at world championships, and two bronze and two gold medals at European championships.

He graduated from the State Academy of Physical Culture of Volgograd.
