= Thomas Simart =

French sprint canoeist (born 1987)

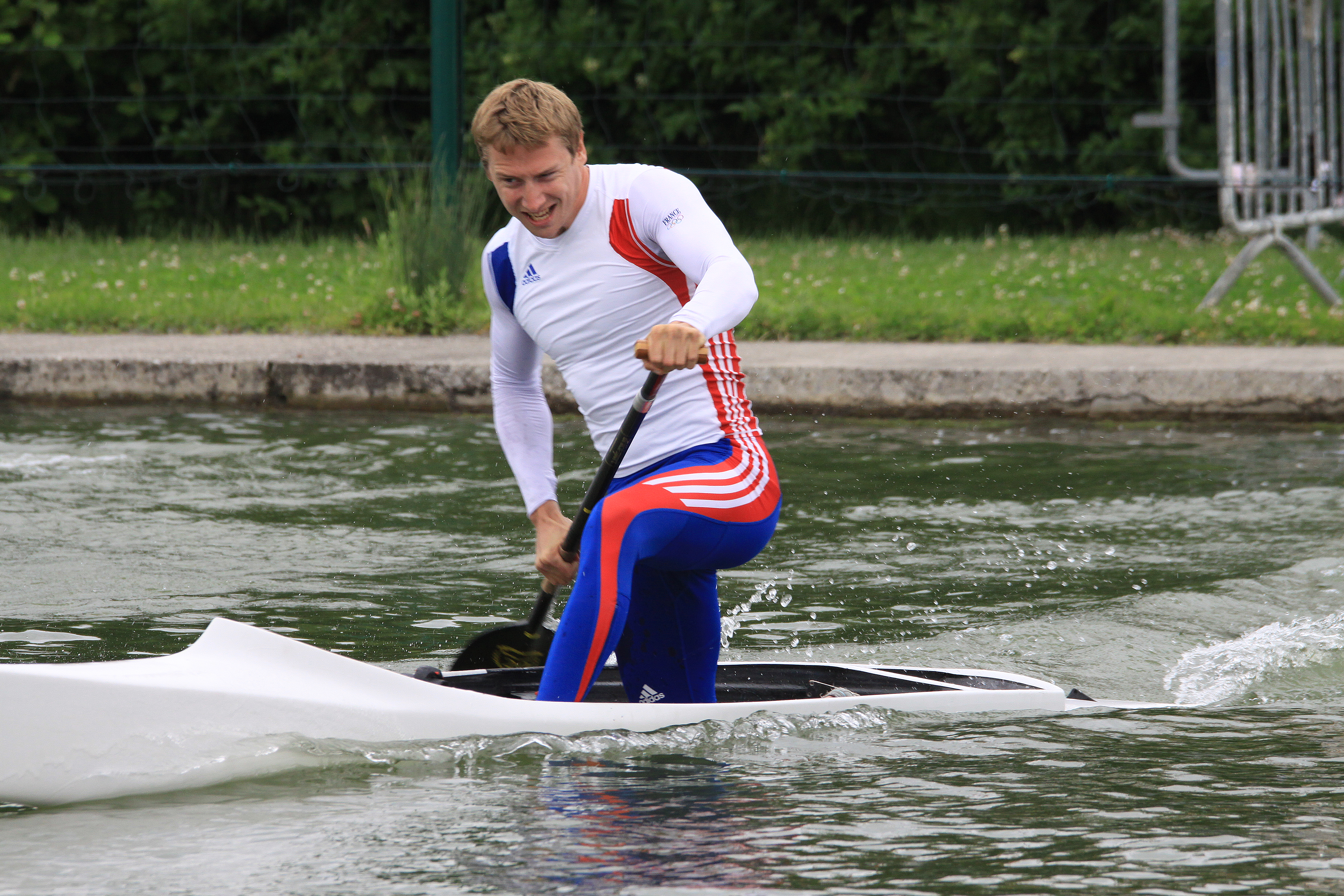
- Simart in 2013

Personal information
- Born: 9 October 1987 (age 39) Bois-Bernard, France
- Height: 183 cm (6 ft 0 in)
- Weight: 81 kg (179 lb)
Medal record
Men's canoe sprint
Representing France
World Championships
Silver medal – second place	2010 Poznań	C-1 200 m
Bronze medal – third place	2009 Dartmouth	C-1 4 x 200 m

Thomas Simart (born 9 October 1987) is a French sprint canoeist who has competed since the late 2000s. He won a two medals at the ICF Canoe Sprint World Championships with a silver (C-1 200: 2010) and a bronze (C-1 4 x 200 m: 2009).
