= Sete Benavides =

Spanish canoeist

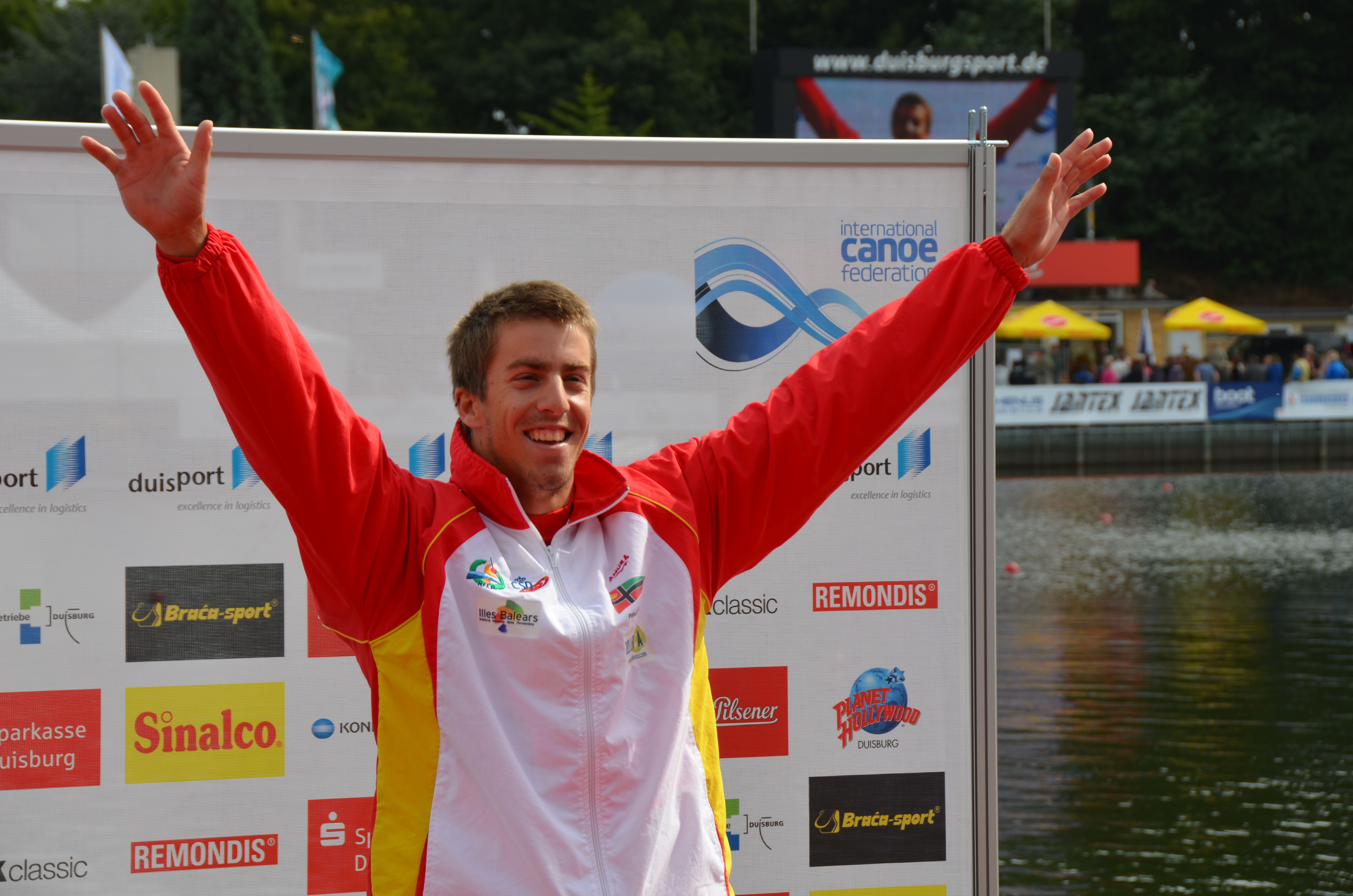
- Benavides in 2013

Personal information
- Born: 9 March 1991 (age 35) Pollença, Spain
- Height: 1.81 m (5 ft 11 in)
- Weight: 84 kg (185 lb)

Sport
- Country: Spain
- Sport: Sprint canoe
- Events: C–1 200 m, C-2 500 m
- Club: Club Nautico de Pollenca
Medal record
Men's sprint canoe
Representing Spain
Olympic Games
| Bronze medal – third place | 2012 London | C-1 200 m |
World Championships
| Bronze medal – third place | 2011 Szeged | C-1 200 m |
| Bronze medal – third place | 2013 Duisburg | C-1 200 m |
| Bronze medal – third place | 2019 Szeged | C-2 500 m |
European Games
| Bronze medal – third place | 2019 Minsk | C-1 200 m |
European Championships
| Silver medal – second place | 2011 Belgrade | C-1 200 m |
| Silver medal – second place | 2012 Zagreb | C-1 200 m |
| Silver medal – second place | 2014 Brandenburg | C-1 200 m |
| Silver medal – second place | 2022 Munich | C-2 200 m |
| Bronze medal – third place | 2015 Račice | C-1 200 m |

Alfonso Benavides López de Ayala (born 9 March 1991), known as Sete Benavides, is a Spanish sprint canoeist who twice represented Spain at the Olympics and has won medals at Olympic, world and European levels.

== Early life ==
Benavides was born on 9 March 1991 in Pollença, Mallorca, Spain.

== Career ==
Benavides won his first medals in 2011. He took bronze in the C-1 200 m at the 2011 ICF Canoe Sprint World Championships in Szeged, Hungary and silver in the same category at the 2011 Canoe Sprint European Championships in Belgrade, Serbia.

Benavides was selected to represent Spain at the 2012 Summer Olympics in London, England, United Kingdom. He competed in the Men's C-1 200 metres. He set the fastest time in round one as he advanced from his heat. He finished second in his semi-final as he advanced to the final. Initially, he was ranked fourth in the final in a time of 43.038 seconds. However, in 2019, he was awarded the bronze medal after Jevgenijus Šuklinas of Lithuania was stripped of the medal for a doping violation.

A year later, he won bronze in the C-1 200 m at the 2013 ICF Canoe Sprint World Championships in Duisburg, Germany.

He was named the Spanish Canoeing Federation's male athlete of the year in 2014.

Benavides was again selected to represent Spain at the 2016 Summer Olympics in Rio de Janeiro, Brazil. He competed in the Men's C-1 200 metres. He won his heat to progress through round one. In the semi-finals, he set the fastest time as he advanced to the final. He finished again finished fourth in the final 0.021 seconds away from winning a medal.

In 2019, he won bronze in the men's C-2 500 m at the World Championships, with Antoni Segura.
