= Zaza Nadiradze =

Georgian sprint canoeist (born 1993)

Personal information
- Native name: ზაზა ნადირაძე
- Nationality: Georgian
- Born: 2 September 1993 (age 32) Mtskheta, Georgia
- Height: 1.77 m (5 ft 10 in)
- Weight: 85 kg (187 lb)

Sport
- Country: Georgia
- Sport: Sprint canoe
- Event: C-1 200 m
- Club: Valiko Girda
- Coached by: Kakhaber Lomishvili
Medal record
Men's canoe sprint
Representing Georgia
World Championships
Silver medal – second place	2017 Račice	C-1 200 m
Bronze medal – third place	2019 Szeged	C-1 200 m
Bronze medal – third place	2024 Samarkand	C-1 200 m
European Championships
Gold medal – first place	2018 Belgrade	C-1 200 m
Silver medal – second place	2023 Kraków	C-1 200 m
Bronze medal – third place	2017 Plovdiv	C-1 200 m
Bronze medal – third place	2024 Szeged	C-1 200 m
European Games
Silver medal – second place	2023 Kraków	C-1 200 m

Zaza Nadiradze (Georgian: ზაზა ნადირაძე) (born 2 September 1993) is a Georgian sprint canoeist. He competed in the men's C-1 200 metres event at the 2016 Summer Olympics.

== Major results ==
=== Olympic Games ===
Year	C-1 200
2016	5

=== World championships ===
Year	C-1 200	C-1 500	C-1 1000	K-1 5000
2011	8 SF	7 FB	9 SF	
2013	5 FB	7 SF		DNS
2014	9 FB			
2015	1 FC			
2017	2nd place, silver medalist(s)			
2018	4			
2019	3rd place, bronze medalist(s)			
2022	5			
2023	4			
2024	3rd place, bronze medalist(s)		—N/a	

=== European championships ===
Year	C-1 200	C-2 200
2015	9	
2017	3rd place, bronze medalist(s)	
2018	1st place, gold medalist(s)	
2019	4	
2021	4	
2022	4	
2023	2nd place, silver medalist(s)	—N/a
2024	3rd place, bronze medalist(s)	8
