= Hélder Silva =

Portuguese canoeist (born 1987)

Personal information
- Born: 2 August 1987 (age 38) Braga, Portugal

Sport
- Country: Portugal
- Sport: Canoe sprint
Medal record
European Championships
Bronze medal – third place	2014 Brandenburg	C-1 200 m

Hélder Silva (born 2 August 1987) is a Portuguese canoeist. He competed in the men's C-1 200 metres event at the 2016 Summer Olympics.
