= Canoeing at the 2014 Asian Games =

- Venue: Misari Regatta
- Dates: 27 September – 2 October 2014
- Competitors: 228 from 20 nations

Canoeing at the 2014 Asian Games was held in Hanam Misari Canoe/Kayak Center, Hanam, South Korea from September 27 to October 2, 2014. There were sprints and a slalom on flat water and not an artificial canoe slalom course.

== Schedule ==
| H | Heats | S | Semifinal | F | Final |

| Event↓/Date → | 27th Sat | 28th Sun | 29th Mon | 30th Tue | 1st Wed | 2nd Thu | |
Slalom
| Men's C-1 | | | | | H | S | F |
| Men's K-1 | | | | | H | S | F |
| Women's C-1 | | | | | H | S | F |
| Women's K-1 | | | | | H | S | F |
Sprint
| Men's C-1 200 m | H | S | F | | | | |
| Men's C-1 1000 m | H | S | F | | | | |
| Men's C-2 1000 m | H | S | F | | | | |
| Men's K-1 200 m | H | S | F | | | | |
| Men's K-1 1000 m | H | S | F | | | | |
| Men's K-2 200 m | H | S | F | | | | |
| Men's K-2 1000 m | H | S | F | | | | |
| Men's K-4 1000 m | H | S | F | | | | |
| Women's K-1 200 m | H | S | F | | | | |
| Women's K-1 500 m | H | S | F | | | | |
| Women's K-2 500 m | H | S | F | | | | |
| Women's K-4 500 m | | | F | | | | |

== Medalists ==
=== Slalom ===
==== Men ====
| Event | Gold | Silver | Bronze |
|---|---|---|---|
| C-1 | Takuya Haneda; Japan | Chang Yun-chuan; Chinese Taipei | Wang Xiaodong; China |
| K-1 | Kazuya Adachi; Japan | Pan Hung-ming; Chinese Taipei | Yuan Tao; China |

==== Women ====
| Event | Gold | Silver | Bronze |
|---|---|---|---|
| C-1 | Cen Nanqin; China | Chen Wei-han; Chinese Taipei | Sonia Gomari; Iran |
| K-1 | Li Tong; China | Chang Chu-han; Chinese Taipei | Aki Yazawa; Japan |

=== Sprint ===
==== Men ====
| Event | Gold | Silver | Bronze |
|---|---|---|---|
| C-1 200 m | Li Qiang; China | Naoya Sakamoto; Japan | Adel Mojallali; Iran |
| C-1 1000 m | Vadim Menkov; Uzbekistan | Sergey Yemelyanov; Kazakhstan | Wang Longkui; China |
| C-2 1000 m | Kazakhstan; Mikhail Yemelyanov; Timofey Yemelyanov | China; Zheng Pengfei; Wang Riwei | Uzbekistan; Serik Mirbekov; Gerasim Kochnev |
| K-1 200 m | Cho Gwang-hee; South Korea | Ernest Irnazarov; Uzbekistan | Seiji Komatsu; Japan |
| K-1 1000 m | Aleksey Mochalov; Uzbekistan | Ahmad Reza Talebian; Iran | Yuriy Berezintsev; Kazakhstan |
| K-2 200 m | Japan; Momotaro Matsushita; Hiroki Fujishima | Kazakhstan; Yevgeniy Alexeyev; Alexey Dergunov | China; Zong Meng; Chu Youyong |
| K-2 1000 m | Kazakhstan; Yevgeniy Alexeyev; Alexey Dergunov | Iran; Ali Aghamirzaei; Saeid Fazloula | China; Li Zhenyu; Sun Xinchang |
| K-4 1000 m | Kazakhstan; Ilya Golendov; Daulet Sultanbekov; Andrey Yerguchyov; Alexandr Yemelyanov | China; Zhuang Shuibin; Li Guiqiang; Wu Xiaojun; Zhao Rong | Uzbekistan; Sergey Borzov; Vyacheslav Gorn; Aleksey Mochalov; Aleksandr Tropin |

==== Women ====
| Event | Gold | Silver | Bronze |
|---|---|---|---|
| K-1 200 m | Inna Klinova; Kazakhstan | Zhou Yu; China | Arezoo Hakimi; Iran |
| K-1 500 m | Zhou Yu; China | Natalya Sergeyeva; Kazakhstan | Lee Sun-ja; South Korea |
| K-2 500 m | Kazakhstan; Natalya Sergeyeva; Irina Podoinikova | China; Ren Wenjun; Ma Qing | Japan; Asumi Omura; Shiho Kakizaki |
| K-4 500 m | China; Ren Wenjun; Huang Jieyi; Ma Qing; Liu Haiping | South Korea; Lee Min; Lee Sun-ja; Lee Hye-ran; Kim You-jin | Kazakhstan; Yekaterina Kaltenberger; Kristina Absinskaya; Zoya Ananchenko; Irina Podoinikova |

== Medal table ==
| Rank | Nation | Gold | Silver | Bronze | Total |
|---|---|---|---|---|---|
| 1 | China (CHN) | 5 | 4 | 5 | 14 |
| 2 | Kazakhstan (KAZ) | 5 | 3 | 2 | 10 |
| 3 | Japan (JPN) | 3 | 1 | 3 | 7 |
| 4 | Uzbekistan (UZB) | 2 | 1 | 2 | 5 |
| 5 | South Korea (KOR) | 1 | 1 | 1 | 3 |
| 6 | Chinese Taipei (TPE) | 0 | 4 | 0 | 4 |
| 7 | Iran (IRI) | 0 | 2 | 3 | 5 |
| Totals (7 entries) | | 16 | 16 | 16 | 48 |

== Participating nations ==
A total of 228 athletes from 20 nations competed in canoeing at the 2014 Asian Games:

- China (27)
- Chinese Taipei (14)
- Hong Kong (3)
- India (18)
- Indonesia (12)
- Iran (18)
- Iraq (2)
- Japan (19)
- Kazakhstan (20)
- Kyrgyzstan (9)
- Lebanon (1)
- Macau (8)
- Nepal (1)
- North Korea (2)
- Philippines (1)
- Singapore (11)
- South Korea (22)
- Tajikistan (4)
- Thailand (15)
- Uzbekistan (21)
