= Canoeing at the 2006 Asian Games =

- Venue: West Bay Lagoon
- Dates: 10–14 December 2006
- Competitors: 103 from 17 nations

Canoe and kayak were held at the 2006 Asian Games in Doha, Qatar from December 10 to December 14. Men's and women's competitions were held in kayak and men's competition in canoe with all events having taken place at the West Bay Lagoon. The competition included only flatwater events.

== Schedule ==
H	Heats	S	Semifinal	F	Final

Event↓/Date →	10th Sun		11th Mon	12th Tue	13th Wed		14th Thu
Men's C-1 500 m					H	S	F
Men's C-1 1000 m	H	S	F				
Men's C-2 500 m					H	S	F
Men's C-2 1000 m	H	S	F				
Men's K-1 500 m					H	S	F
Men's K-1 1000 m	H	S	F				
Men's K-2 500 m					H	S	F
Men's K-2 1000 m	H	S	F				
Women's K-1 500 m					H	S	F
Women's K-2 500 m					H	S	F

== Medalists ==
=== Men ===
Event	Gold	Silver	Bronze
C-1 500 m	Yang Wenjun; China	Zhomart Satubaldin; Kazakhstan	Vadim Menkov; Uzbekistan
C-1 1000 m	Vadim Menkov; Uzbekistan	Yevgeniy Bezhnar; Kazakhstan	Taito Ambo; Japan
C-2 500 m	Kazakhstan; Alexandr Dyadchuk; Kaisar Nurmaganbetov	China; Wang Bing; Yang Wenjun	Uzbekistan; Rustam Mirzadiyarov; Maksim Kiryanov
C-2 1000 m	China; Ma Xiaojie; Huang Shaokun	Uzbekistan; Gerasim Kochnev; Serik Mirbekov	Japan; Taito Ambo; Kosuke Fujii
K-1 500 m	Liu Haitao; China	Sergey Borzov; Uzbekistan	Alexandr Yemelyanov; Kazakhstan
K-1 1000 m	Liu Haitao; China	Aleksey Babadjanov; Uzbekistan	Moon Chul-wook; South Korea
K-2 500 m	Kazakhstan; Dmitriy Torlopov; Dmitriy Kaltenberger	Uzbekistan; Sergey Borzov; Aleksey Babadjanov	China; Li Zhen; Zhou Peng
K-2 1000 m	China; Li Zhen; Lin Miao	Iran; Abbas Sayyadi; Reza Raeisi	Kazakhstan; Yevgeniy Alexeyev; Alexey Podoinikov

=== Women ===
Event	Gold	Silver	Bronze
K-1 500 m	Yuliya Borzova; Uzbekistan	Zhong Hongyan; China	Natalya Sergeyeva; Kazakhstan
K-2 500 m	China; Zhu Minyuan; Yu Lamei	Japan; Shinobu Kitamoto; Mikiko Takeya	South Korea; Lee Sun-ja; Lee Ae-yeon

== Medal table ==
Rank	Nation	Gold	Silver	Bronze	Total
1	China (CHN)	6	2	1	9
2	Uzbekistan (UZB)	2	4	2	8
3	Kazakhstan (KAZ)	2	2	3	7
4	Japan (JPN)	0	1	2	3
5	Iran (IRI)	0	1	0	1
6	South Korea (KOR)	0	0	2	2
Totals (6 entries)		10	10	10	30

== Participating nations ==
A total of 103 athletes from 17 nations competed in canoeing at the 2006 Asian Games:

- China (11)
- Hong Kong (2)
- India (6)
- Indonesia (6)
- Iran (9)
- Iraq (1)
- Japan (8)
- Kazakhstan (12)
- Kyrgyzstan (6)
- Macau (4)
- Mongolia (2)
- Philippines (4)
- Qatar (2)
- South Korea (10)
- Tajikistan (2)
- Uzbekistan (9)
- Vietnam (9)
