= Canoeing at the 2010 Asian Games – Men's K-2 1000 metres =

Men's K-2 1000 metres at the 2010 Asian Games
- Venue: Guangzhou International Rowing Centre
- Date: 22–25 November 2010
- Competitors: 26 from 13 nations

Medalists
gold medal	Momotaro Matsushita; Keiji Mizumoto	Japan
silver medal	Sergey Borzov; Aleksey Babadjanov	Uzbekistan
bronze medal	Hu Yonglin; Wang Lei	China

The men's K-2 1000 metres sprint canoeing competition at the 2010 Asian Games in Guangzhou was held from 22 to 25 November at the International Rowing Centre.

== Schedule ==
All times are China Standard Time (UTC+08:00)

Date	Time	Event
Monday, 22 November 2010	10:50	Heats
Tuesday, 23 November 2010	11:00	Semifinal
Thursday, 25 November 2010	11:40	Final

== Results ==
Legend

- DNF — Did not finish

=== Heats ===
- Qualification: 1–3 → Final (QF), Rest → Semifinal (QS)

==== Heat 1 ====
Rank	Team	Time	Notes
1	Japan (JPN); Keiji Mizumoto; Hiroki Watanabe	3:18.178	QF
2	Kazakhstan (KAZ); Alexandr Yemelyanov; Alexey Dergunov	3:18.967	QF
3	Uzbekistan (UZB); Vilyam Ibragimov; Vladimir Osokin	3:24.292	QF
4	Indonesia (INA); Silo; Muchlis	3:32.972	QS
5	Vietnam (VIE); Nguyễn Văn Chi; Nguyễn Thành Quang	3:34.714	QS
6	Tajikistan (TJK); Zohirjon Nabiev; Tokhir Nurmukhammadi	3:54.991	QS
—	Mongolia (MGL); Gankhuyagiin Erdenebulgan; Baldangombyn Pürevsüren	DNF	

==== Heat 2 ====
Rank	Team	Time	Notes
1	China (CHN); Huang Zhipeng; Xu Haitao	3:18.242	QF
2	Iran (IRI); Arvand Darvish; Alireza Alimohammadi	3:20.477	QF
3	Thailand (THA); Nathaworn Waenphrom; Piyaphan Phaophat	3:21.535	QF
4	Kyrgyzstan (KGZ); Ilia Algin; Aleksey Nikolaev	3:22.262	QS
5	South Korea (KOR); Kim Young-hwan; Nam Sung-ho	3:29.575	QS
6	India (IND); Premananda Singh; Gyanjit Singh	3:37.633	QS

=== Semifinal ===
- Qualification: 1–3 → Final (QF)

Rank	Team	Time	Notes
1	Kyrgyzstan (KGZ); Ilia Algin; Aleksey Nikolaev	3:28.380	QF
2	South Korea (KOR); Kim Young-hwan; Nam Sung-ho	3:31.541	QF
3	Indonesia (INA); Silo; Muchlis	3:38.383	QF
4	India (IND); Premananda Singh; Gyanjit Singh	3:45.150	
5	Tajikistan (TJK); Zohirjon Nabiev; Tokhir Nurmukhammadi	3:48.523	
6	Vietnam (VIE); Nguyễn Văn Chi; Nguyễn Thành Quang	3:51.188	

=== Final ===
Rank	Team	Time
1st place, gold medalist(s)	China (CHN); Huang Zhipeng; Xu Haitao	3:14.699
2nd place, silver medalist(s)	Kazakhstan (KAZ); Alexandr Yemelyanov; Alexey Dergunov	3:16.195
3rd place, bronze medalist(s)	Japan (JPN); Keiji Mizumoto; Hiroki Watanabe	3:16.523
4	Thailand (THA); Nathaworn Waenphrom; Piyaphan Phaophat	3:18.110
5	Iran (IRI); Arvand Darvish; Alireza Alimohammadi	3:21.943
6	Kyrgyzstan (KGZ); Ilia Algin; Aleksey Nikolaev	3:25.719
7	Uzbekistan (UZB); Vilyam Ibragimov; Vladimir Osokin	3:27.881
8	South Korea (KOR); Kim Young-hwan; Nam Sung-ho	3:28.334
9	Indonesia (INA); Silo; Muchlis	4:13.879
