= Canoeing at the 2010 Asian Games – Men's K-4 1000 metres =

Asian Games competition

Men's K-4 1000 metres at the 2010 Asian Games
- Venue: Guangzhou International Rowing Centre
- Date: 22–25 November 2010
- Competitors: 40 from 10 nations

Medalists
gold medal	Uzbekistan; Sergey Borzov, Aleksey Babadjanov, Aleksey Mochalov, Vyacheslav Gorn
silver medal	Kazakhstan; Alexandr Yemelyanov, Yevgeniy Alexeyev, Dmitriy Torlopov, Yevgeniy Yegorov
bronze medal	Iran; Hossein Sinkaei, Ahmad Reza Talebian, Farzin Asadi, Amin Boudaghi

The men's K-4 1000 metres sprint canoeing competition at the 2010 Asian Games in Guangzhou was held from 22 to 25 November at the International Rowing Centre.

== Schedule ==
All times are China Standard Time (UTC+08:00)

Date	Time	Event
Monday, 22 November 2010	12:20	Heats
Tuesday, 23 November 2010	12:10	Semifinal
Thursday, 25 November 2010	12:40	Final

== Results ==
=== Heats ===
- Qualification: 1–3 → Final (QF), Rest → Semifinal (QS)

==== Heat 1 ====
Rank	Team	Time	Notes
1	Kazakhstan (KAZ); Alexandr Yemelyanov; Yevgeniy Alexeyev; Dmitriy Torlopov; Yevgeniy Yegorov	2:58.610	QF
2	China (CHN); Zhang Fusheng; Xu Haitao; Pan Yao; Huang Zhipeng	3:00.505	QF
3	Kyrgyzstan (KGZ); Aleksandr Parol; Aleksei Krinitskii; Igor Dorofeev; Maksim Bondar	3:01.087	QF
4	Thailand (THA); Prassamin Witheskosum; Wichan Jaitieng; Piyaphan Phaophat; Nathaworn Waenphrom	3:13.912	QS
5	Macau (MAC); Leong Ka Hou; Ng Chi Fong; Lam U Teng; Che Hon Man	3:52.236	QS

==== Heat 2 ====
Rank	Team	Time	Notes
1	Uzbekistan (UZB); Sergey Borzov; Aleksey Babadjanov; Aleksey Mochalov; Vyacheslav Gorn	2:58.101	QF
2	Iran (IRI); Hossein Sinkaei; Ahmad Reza Talebian; Farzin Asadi; Amin Boudaghi	3:00.405	QF
3	South Korea (KOR); Moon Chul-wook; Seo Tae-won; Kim Dae-jin; Kim Yong-kyo	3:07.676	QF
4	India (IND); Bhupender Singh; N. Digvijay Singh; Sanjay Singh; Ajit Singh	3:13.691	QS
5	Tajikistan (TJK); Zohirjon Nabiev; Muhammadullo Nadirov; Tokhir Nurmukhammadi; Nodirjon Safarov	3:29.913	QS

=== Semifinal ===
- Qualification: 1–3 → Final (QF)

Rank	Team	Time	Notes
1	India (IND); Bhupender Singh; N. Digvijay Singh; Sanjay Singh; Ajit Singh	3:16.237	QF
2	Thailand (THA); Prassamin Witheskosum; Wichan Jaitieng; Piyaphan Phaophat; Nathaworn Waenphrom	3:16.585	QF
3	Tajikistan (TJK); Zohirjon Nabiev; Muhammadullo Nadirov; Tokhir Nurmukhammadi; Nodirjon Safarov	3:28.695	QF
4	Macau (MAC); Leong Ka Hou; Ng Chi Fong; Lam U Teng; Che Hon Man	3:53.416	

=== Final ===
Rank	Team	Time
1st place, gold medalist(s)	Uzbekistan (UZB); Sergey Borzov; Aleksey Babadjanov; Aleksey Mochalov; Vyacheslav Gorn	2:57.373
2nd place, silver medalist(s)	Kazakhstan (KAZ); Alexandr Yemelyanov; Yevgeniy Alexeyev; Dmitriy Torlopov; Yevgeniy Yegorov	2:58.795
3rd place, bronze medalist(s)	Iran (IRI); Hossein Sinkaei; Ahmad Reza Talebian; Farzin Asadi; Amin Boudaghi	2:58.843
4	China (CHN); Zhang Fusheng; Xu Haitao; Pan Yao; Huang Zhipeng	3:02.146
5	Kyrgyzstan (KGZ); Aleksandr Parol; Aleksei Krinitskii; Igor Dorofeev; Maksim Bondar	3:05.694
6	South Korea (KOR); Moon Chul-wook; Seo Tae-won; Kim Dae-jin; Kim Yong-kyo	3:08.153
7	India (IND); Bhupender Singh; N. Digvijay Singh; Sanjay Singh; Ajit Singh	3:13.309
8	Thailand (THA); Prassamin Witheskosum; Wichan Jaitieng; Piyaphan Phaophat; Nathaworn Waenphrom	3:19.408
9	Tajikistan (TJK); Zohirjon Nabiev; Muhammadullo Nadirov; Tokhir Nurmukhammadi; Nodirjon Safarov	3:24.940
