= Canoeing at the 2018 Asian Games – Men's K-4 500 metres =

Men's K-4 500 metres at the 2018 Asian Games
- Venue: Jakabaring Lake
- Date: 29–30 August 2018
- Competitors: 40 from 10 nations

Medalists
gold medal	Kazakhstan; Ilya Golendov, Alexey Dergunov, Sergii Tokarnytskyi, Yevgeniy Alexeyev
silver medal	South Korea; Cho Gwang-hee, Cho Jeong-hyun, Choi Min-kyu, Kim Ji-won
bronze medal	Iran; Ahmad Reza Talebian, Peyman Ghavidel, Ali Aghamirzaei, Amin Boudaghi

The men's sprint K-4 (kayak four) 500 metres competition at the 2018 Asian Games was held from 29 to 30 August 2018.

== Schedule ==
All times are Western Indonesia Time (UTC+07:00)

Date	Time	Event
Wednesday, 29 August 2018	08:50	Heats
Wednesday, 29 August 2018	16:10	Semifinal
Thursday, 30 August 2018	08:40	Final

== Results ==
=== Heats ===
- Qualification: 1–3 → Final (QF), Rest → Semifinal (QS)

==== Heat 1 ====
Rank	Team	Time	Notes
1	Kazakhstan (KAZ); Ilya Golendov; Alexey Dergunov; Sergii Tokarnytskyi; Yevgeniy Alexeyev	1:25.457	QF
2	Iran (IRI); Ahmad Reza Talebian; Peyman Ghavidel; Ali Aghamirzaei; Amin Boudaghi	1:28.469	QF
3	Thailand (THA); Aditep Srichart; Thoedsak Sonthi; Wattana Chitphantulap; Chanrit Chakkhian	1:34.693	QF
4	Tajikistan (TJK); Abdusattor Gafurov; Zohirjon Nabiev; Saidilhomkhon Nazirov; Tokhir Nurmukhammadi	1:37.380	QS
5	India (IND); Albert Raj Selvaraj; A. Chingching Singh; L. Naocha Singh; Prohit Baroi	1:37.549	QS

==== Heat 2 ====
Rank	Team	Time	Notes
1	Japan (JPN); Hiroki Fujishima; Momotaro Matsushita; Seiji Komatsu; Keiji Mizumoto	1:25.628	QF
2	South Korea (KOR); Cho Gwang-hee; Cho Jeong-hyun; Choi Min-kyu; Kim Ji-won	1:26.796	QF
3	Uzbekistan (UZB); Aleksandr Tropin; Javokhir Nurmatov; Vilyam Ibragimov; Aleksey Mochalov	1:28.826	QF
4	Indonesia (INA); Gandie; Mugi Harjito; Tri Wahyu Buwono; Maizir Riyondra	1:31.862	QS
5	Myanmar (MYA); Lwin Moe; Aung Zin Ko; Thar Nyi Khant; Myint Ko Ko	1:41.628	QS

=== Semifinal ===
- Qualification: 1–3 → Final (QF)

Rank	Team	Time	Notes
1	Indonesia (INA); Gandie; Mugi Harjito; Tri Wahyu Buwono; Maizir Riyondra	1:29.859	QF
2	India (IND); Albert Raj Selvaraj; A. Chingching Singh; L. Naocha Singh; Prohit Baroi	1:33.587	QF
3	Tajikistan (TJK); Abdusattor Gafurov; Zohirjon Nabiev; Saidilhomkhon Nazirov; Tokhir Nurmukhammadi	1:34.501	QF
4	Myanmar (MYA); Lwin Moe; Aung Zin Ko; Thar Nyi Khant; Myint Ko Ko	1:37.427	

=== Final ===
Rank	Team	Time
1st place, gold medalist(s)	Kazakhstan (KAZ); Ilya Golendov; Alexey Dergunov; Sergii Tokarnytskyi; Yevgeniy Alexeyev	1:24.203
2nd place, silver medalist(s)	South Korea (KOR); Cho Gwang-hee; Cho Jeong-hyun; Choi Min-kyu; Kim Ji-won	1:25.313
3rd place, bronze medalist(s)	Iran (IRI); Ahmad Reza Talebian; Peyman Ghavidel; Ali Aghamirzaei; Amin Boudaghi	1:26.217
4	Japan (JPN); Hiroki Fujishima; Momotaro Matsushita; Seiji Komatsu; Keiji Mizumoto	1:26.939
5	Uzbekistan (UZB); Aleksandr Tropin; Javokhir Nurmatov; Vilyam Ibragimov; Aleksey Mochalov	1:28.557
6	Indonesia (INA); Gandie; Mugi Harjito; Tri Wahyu Buwono; Maizir Riyondra	1:32.125
7	Thailand (THA); Aditep Srichart; Thoedsak Sonthi; Wattana Chitphantulap; Chanrit Chakkhian	1:34.947
8	Tajikistan (TJK); Abdusattor Gafurov; Zohirjon Nabiev; Saidilhomkhon Nazirov; Tokhir Nurmukhammadi	1:37.539
9	India (IND); Albert Raj Selvaraj; A. Chingching Singh; L. Naocha Singh; Prohit Baroi	1:40.809
