= Canoeing at the 2006 Asian Games – Men's K-2 1000 metres =

Men's K-2 1000 metres at the 2006 Asian Games
- Venue: West Bay Lagoon
- Date: 10–11 December 2006
- Competitors: 28 from 14 nations

Medalists
gold medal	Li Zhen; Lin Miao	China
silver medal	Abbas Sayyadi; Reza Raeisi	Iran
bronze medal	Yevgeniy Alexeyev; Alexey Podoinikov	Kazakhstan

The men's K-2 1000 metres sprint canoeing competition at the 2006 Asian Games in Doha was held on 10 and 11 December at the West Bay Lagoon.

== Schedule ==
All times are Arabia Standard Time (UTC+03:00)

Date	Time	Event
Sunday, 10 December 2006	09:50	Heats
Sunday, 10 December 2006	14:20	Semifinal
Monday, 11 December 2006	14:40	Final

== Results ==
Legend

- DNS — Did not start

=== Heats ===
- Qualification: 1 → Final (QF), 2–3 → Semifinal (QS)

==== Heat 1 ====
Rank	Athlete	Time	Notes
1	Kyrgyzstan (KGZ); Aleksandr Gurkin; Aleksey Nikolaev	4:04.510	QF
2	India (IND); N. Digvijay Singh; A. Chingching Singh	4:07.210	QS
3	Kazakhstan (KAZ); Yevgeniy Alexeyev; Alexey Podoinikov	4:08.626	QS
4	Macau (MAC); Leong Lap Chong; Chao Man Kit	4:36.950	
5	Tajikistan (TJK); Nodirjon Safarov; Zohirjon Nabiev	4:50.478	

==== Heat 2 ====
Rank	Athlete	Time	Notes
1	China (CHN); Li Zhen; Lin Miao	3:49.129	QF
2	Japan (JPN); Naoki Onoto; Momotaro Matsushita	3:54.113	QS
3	Indonesia (INA); Kuat; Sayadin	3:56.417	QS
4	Vietnam (VIE); Nguyễn Văn Chi; Đặng Văn Thắng	4:04.161	
5	Hong Kong (HKG); Tse Chor Yin; Lo Ho Yin	4:33.205	

==== Heat 3 ====
Rank	Athlete	Time	Notes
1	Uzbekistan (UZB); Sergey Borzov; Aleksey Babadjanov	3:47.912	QF
2	Iran (IRI); Abbas Sayyadi; Reza Raeisi	3:52.036	QS
3	South Korea (KOR); Nam Sung-ho; Kim Sun-bok	4:02.528	QS
—	Qatar (QAT); Saeed Al-Mosallam; Mohammed Al-Badr	DNS	

=== Semifinal ===
- Qualification: 1–3 → Final (QF)

Rank	Athlete	Time	Notes
1	Kazakhstan (KAZ); Yevgeniy Alexeyev; Alexey Podoinikov	3:34.995	QF
2	Iran (IRI); Abbas Sayyadi; Reza Raeisi	3:37.831	QF
3	South Korea (KOR); Nam Sung-ho; Kim Sun-bok	3:39.543	QF
4	Indonesia (INA); Kuat; Sayadin	3:43.883	
5	Japan (JPN); Naoki Onoto; Momotaro Matsushita	3:48.051	
6	India (IND); N. Digvijay Singh; A. Chingching Singh	4:13.703	

=== Final ===
Rank	Team	Time
1st place, gold medalist(s)	China (CHN); Li Zhen; Lin Miao	3:56.423
2nd place, silver medalist(s)	Iran (IRI); Abbas Sayyadi; Reza Raeisi	3:58.491
3rd place, bronze medalist(s)	Kazakhstan (KAZ); Yevgeniy Alexeyev; Alexey Podoinikov	3:59.343
4	Uzbekistan (UZB); Sergey Borzov; Aleksey Babadjanov	4:05.855
5	Kyrgyzstan (KGZ); Aleksandr Gurkin; Aleksey Nikolaev	4:06.071
6	South Korea (KOR); Nam Sung-ho; Kim Sun-bok	4:11.715
