= Canoeing at the 2014 Asian Games – Men's K-4 1000 metres =

Men's K-4 1000 metres at the 2014 Asian Games
- Venue: Misari Regatta
- Date: 27–29 September 2014
- Competitors: 48 from 12 nations

Medalists
gold medal	Kazakhstan; Ilya Golendov, Daulet Sultanbekov, Andrey Yerguchyov, Alexandr Yemelyanov
silver medal	China; Zhuang Shuibin, Li Guiqiang, Wu Xiaojun, Zhao Rong
bronze medal	Uzbekistan; Sergey Borzov, Vyacheslav Gorn, Aleksey Mochalov, Aleksandr Tropin

The men's K-4 1000 metres sprint canoeing competition at the 2014 Asian Games in Hanam was held from 27 to 29 September at the Misari Canoe/Kayak Center.

== Schedule ==
All times are Korea Standard Time (UTC+09:00)

Date	Time	Event
Saturday, 27 September 2014	12:00	Heats
Sunday, 28 September 2014	13:00	Semifinal
Monday, 29 September 2014	13:15	Final

== Results ==
=== Heats ===
- Qualification: 1–3 → Final (QF), Rest → Semifinal (QS)

==== Heat 1 ====
Rank	Team	Time	Notes
1	Iran (IRI); Ahmad Reza Talebian; Hamid Reza Torki; Farzin Asadi; Amin Boudaghi	3:07.105	QF
2	Indonesia (INA); Andri Sugiarto; Maizir Riyondra; Dedi Kurniawan Suyatno; Muchlis	3:10.312	QF
3	Singapore (SIN); Bill Lee; Tay Zi Qiang; Brandon Ooi; Lucas Teo	3:11.885	QF
4	South Korea (KOR); Park Jeong-hoon; Choi Jae-young; Lee Hyun-woo; Lee Hyun-woo	3:15.215	QS
5	Kyrgyzstan (KGZ); Aleksandr Parol; Daniil Teterev; Ruslan Saifulin; Artem Teterev	3:16.942	QS
6	India (IND); Ajit Singh; Sunny Kumar; Ramesh Golli; A. Chingching Singh	3:21.136	QS

==== Heat 2 ====
Rank	Team	Time	Notes
1	Kazakhstan (KAZ); Ilya Golendov; Daulet Sultanbekov; Andrey Yerguchyov; Alexandr Yemelyanov	2:55.329	QF
2	Uzbekistan (UZB); Sergey Borzov; Vyacheslav Gorn; Aleksey Mochalov; Aleksandr Tropin	2:58.321	QF
3	China (CHN); Zhuang Shuibin; Li Guiqiang; Wu Xiaojun; Zhao Rong	2:59.758	QF
4	Thailand (THA); Aditep Srichart; Wichan Jaitieng; Kasemsit Borriboonwasin; Nathaworn Waenphrom	3:10.622	QS
5	Chinese Taipei (TPE); Pai Hsiu-chuan; Yu yin-ting Lin Ya-she; Lin Yung-chieh	3:21.614	QS
6	Macau (MAC); Leong Lap Chong; Chong Hio Man; Che Man Tou; Chao Man Kit	3:49.057	QS

=== Semifinal ===
- Qualification: 1–3 → Final (QF)

Rank	Team	Time	Notes
1	Thailand (THA); Aditep Srichart; Wichan Jaitieng; Kasemsit Borriboonwasin; Nathaworn Waenphrom	3:14.500	QF
2	South Korea (KOR); Park Jeong-hoon; Choi Jae-young; Lee Hyun-woo; Lee Hyun-woo	3:14.646	QF
3	India (IND); Ajit Singh; Sunny Kumar; Ramesh Golli; A. Chingching Singh	3:14.908	QF
4	Kyrgyzstan (KGZ); Aleksandr Parol; Daniil Teterev; Ruslan Saifulin; Artem Teterev	3:16.286	
5	Chinese Taipei (TPE); Pai Hsiu-chuan; Yu yin-ting Lin Ya-she; Lin Yung-chieh	3:16.957	
6	Macau (MAC); Leong Lap Chong; Chong Hio Man; Che Man Tou; Chao Man Kit	3:50.700	

=== Final ===
Rank	Team	Time
1st place, gold medalist(s)	Kazakhstan (KAZ); Ilya Golendov; Daulet Sultanbekov; Andrey Yerguchyov; Alexandr Yemelyanov	2:57.396
2nd place, silver medalist(s)	China (CHN); Zhuang Shuibin; Li Guiqiang; Wu Xiaojun; Zhao Rong	3:01.374
3rd place, bronze medalist(s)	Uzbekistan (UZB); Sergey Borzov; Vyacheslav Gorn; Aleksey Mochalov; Aleksandr Tropin	3:01.819
4	Iran (IRI); Ahmad Reza Talebian; Hamid Reza Torki; Farzin Asadi; Amin Boudaghi	3:06.077
5	Indonesia (INA); Andri Sugiarto; Maizir Riyondra; Dedi Kurniawan Suyatno; Muchlis	3:12.178
6	Thailand (THA); Aditep Srichart; Wichan Jaitieng; Kasemsit Borriboonwasin; Nathaworn Waenphrom	3:12.740
7	South Korea (KOR); Park Jeong-hoon; Choi Jae-young; Lee Hyun-woo; Lee Hyun-woo	3:14.335
8	India (IND); Ajit Singh; Sunny Kumar; Ramesh Golli; A. Chingching Singh	3:15.291
9	Singapore (SIN); Bill Lee; Tay Zi Qiang; Brandon Ooi; Lucas Teo	3:15.898
