= Canoeing at the 2010 Asian Games – Men's K-2 200 metres =

Men's K-2 200 metres at the 2010 Asian Games
- Venue: Guangzhou International Rowing Centre
- Date: 22–26 November 2010
- Competitors: 26 from 13 nations

Medalists
gold medal	Momotaro Matsushita; Keiji Mizumoto	Japan
silver medal	Sergey Borzov; Aleksey Babadjanov	Uzbekistan
bronze medal	Hu Yonglin; Wang Lei	China

The men's K-2 200 metres sprint canoeing competition at the 2010 Asian Games in Guangzhou was held from 22 to 26 November at the International Rowing Centre.

== Schedule ==
All times are China Standard Time (UTC+08:00)

Date	Time	Event
Monday, 22 November 2010	14:50	Heats
Tuesday, 23 November 2010	14:40	Semifinal
Friday, 26 November 2010	11:10	Final

== Results ==
Legend

- DNS — Did not start

=== Heats ===
- Qualification: 1–3 → Final (QF), Rest → Semifinal (QS)

==== Heat 1 ====
Rank	Team	Time	Notes
1	Japan (JPN); Momotaro Matsushita; Keiji Mizumoto	33.999	QF
2	Uzbekistan (UZB); Sergey Borzov; Aleksey Babadjanov	34.886	QF
3	Kyrgyzstan (KGZ); Igor Dorofeev; Maksim Bondar	34.974	QF
4	Thailand (THA); Nathaworn Waenphrom; Piyaphan Phaophat	36.800	QS
5	Indonesia (INA); Silo; Muchlis	37.017	QS
6	Tajikistan (TJK); Zohirjon Nabiev; Nodirjon Safarov	39.772	QS
7	Macau (MAC); Leong Ka Hou; Ng Chi Fong	46.991	QS

==== Heat 2 ====
Rank	Team	Time	Notes
1	China (CHN); Hu Yonglin; Wang Lei	34.720	QF
2	Kazakhstan (KAZ); Alexey Dergunov; Yevgeniy Yegorov	35.187	QF
3	South Korea (KOR); Moon Chul-wook; Kim Yong-kyo	36.836	QF
4	Iran (IRI); Arvand Darvish; Alireza Alimohammadi	37.011	QS
5	North Korea (PRK); Pak Kyong-chol; Ham Jun-song	37.725	QS
6	India (IND); Premananda Singh; Gyanjit Singh	39.569	QS

=== Semifinal ===
- Qualification: 1–3 → Final (QF)

Rank	Team	Time	Notes
1	Thailand (THA); Nathaworn Waenphrom; Piyaphan Phaophat	35.703	QF
2	Iran (IRI); Arvand Darvish; Alireza Alimohammadi	36.713	QF
3	Indonesia (INA); Silo; Muchlis	37.189	QF
4	India (IND); Premananda Singh; Gyanjit Singh	38.809	
5	Tajikistan (TJK); Zohirjon Nabiev; Nodirjon Safarov	39.139	
6	North Korea (PRK); Pak Kyong-chol; Ham Jun-song	41.308	
7	Macau (MAC); Leong Ka Hou; Ng Chi Fong	46.310	

=== Final ===
Rank	Team	Time
1st place, gold medalist(s)	Japan (JPN); Momotaro Matsushita; Keiji Mizumoto	33.058
2nd place, silver medalist(s)	Uzbekistan (UZB); Sergey Borzov; Aleksey Babadjanov	33.183
3rd place, bronze medalist(s)	China (CHN); Hu Yonglin; Wang Lei	33.466
4	Kazakhstan (KAZ); Alexey Dergunov; Yevgeniy Yegorov	33.853
5	Kyrgyzstan (KGZ); Igor Dorofeev; Maksim Bondar	34.477
6	Thailand (THA); Nathaworn Waenphrom; Piyaphan Phaophat	35.253
7	South Korea (KOR); Moon Chul-wook; Kim Yong-kyo	35.948
8	Iran (IRI); Arvand Darvish; Alireza Alimohammadi	36.382
—	Indonesia (INA); Silo; Muchlis	DNS
