= Canoeing at the 2014 Asian Games – Women's K-4 500 metres =

Women's K-4 500 metres at the 2014 Asian Games
- Venue: Misari Regatta
- Date: 29 September 2014
- Competitors: 32 from 8 nations

Medalists
| gold medal | China; Ren Wenjun, Huang Jieyi, Ma Qing, Liu Haiping |
| silver medal | South Korea; Lee Min, Lee Sun-ja, Lee Hye-ran, Kim You-jin |
| bronze medal | Kazakhstan; Yekaterina Kaltenberger, Kristina Absinskaya, Zoya Ananchenko, Irina Podoinikova |

The women's K-4 500 metres sprint canoeing competition at the 2014 Asian Games in Hanam was held from 29 September at the Misari Canoe/Kayak Center.

== Schedule ==
All times are Korea Standard Time (UTC+09:00)

| Date | Time | Event |
|---|---|---|
| Monday, 29 September 2014 | 13:00 | Final |

== Results ==
| Rank | Team | Time |
|---|---|---|
| 1st place, gold medalist(s) | China (CHN); Ren Wenjun; Huang Jieyi; Ma Qing; Liu Haiping | 1:34.477 |
| 2nd place, silver medalist(s) | South Korea (KOR); Lee Min; Lee Sun-ja; Lee Hye-ran; Kim You-jin | 1:36.890 |
| 3rd place, bronze medalist(s) | Kazakhstan (KAZ); Yekaterina Kaltenberger; Kristina Absinskaya; Zoya Ananchenko; Irina Podoinikova | 1:37.184 |
| 4 | Japan (JPN); Asumi Omura; Hideka Tatara; Shiho Kakizaki; Misaki Matsumoto | 1:39.193 |
| 5 | Uzbekistan (UZB); Ekaterina Shubina; Kseniya Kochneva; Kseniya Kalinina; Viktoria Osokina | 1:39.720 |
| 6 | Singapore (SIN); Stephenie Chen; Geraldine Lee; Annabelle Ng; Sarah Chen | 1:43.671 |
| 7 | India (IND); Ragina Kiro; Anusha Biju; Soniya Devi Phairembam; A. Nanao Devi | 1:52.022 |
| 8 | Macau (MAC); Ng Si Cheng; Leong Wai Sim; Chiang Hoi Ian; Louisa Cheong | 2:05.308 |
