= Canoeing at the 2006 Asian Games – Men's K-2 500 metres =

Men's K-2 500 metres at the 2006 Asian Games
- Venue: West Bay Lagoon
- Date: 13–14 December 2006
- Competitors: 28 from 14 nations

Medalists
gold medal	Dmitriy Torlopov; Dmitriy Kaltenberger	Kazakhstan
silver medal	Sergey Borzov; Aleksey Babadjanov	Uzbekistan
bronze medal	Li Zhen; Zhou Peng	China

The men's K-2 500 metres sprint canoeing competition at the 2006 Asian Games in Doha was held on 13 and 14 December at the West Bay Lagoon.

== Schedule ==
All times are Arabia Standard Time (UTC+03:00)

Date	Time	Event
Wednesday, 13 December 2006	10:10	Heats
Wednesday, 13 December 2006	14:30	Semifinal
Thursday, 14 December 2006	14:50	Final

== Results ==
Legend

- DNS — Did not start

=== Heats ===
- Qualification: 1 → Final (QF), 2–3 → Semifinal (QS)

==== Heat 1 ====
Rank	Athlete	Time	Notes
1	Kazakhstan (KAZ); Dmitriy Torlopov; Dmitriy Kaltenberger	1:44.092	QF
2	Kyrgyzstan (KGZ); Ilia Algin; Aleksandr Parol	1:49.808	QS
3	India (IND); A. Chingching Singh; N. Digvijay Singh	1:56.476	QS
4	Hong Kong (HKG); Tse Chor Yin; Lo Ho Yin	1:58.380	
5	Tajikistan (TJK); Nodirjon Safarov; Zohirjon Nabiev	2:08.632	

==== Heat 2 ====
Rank	Athlete	Time	Notes
1	China (CHN); Li Zhen; Zhou Peng	1:48.137	QF
2	Vietnam (VIE); Nguyễn Văn Chi; Đặng Văn Thắng	1:55.433	QS
3	South Korea (KOR); Jo Hyun-goo; Lee Seung-min	1:56.237	QS
4	Macau (MAC); Chao Man Kit; Leong Lap Chong	2:02.189	
—	Qatar (QAT); Saeed Al-Mosallam; Mohammed Al-Badr	DNS	

==== Heat 3 ====
Rank	Athlete	Time	Notes
1	Uzbekistan (UZB); Sergey Borzov; Aleksey Babadjanov	1:41.512	QF
2	Iran (IRI); Yaser Hedayati; Mohsen Milad	1:44.396	QS
3	Japan (JPN); Momotaro Matsushita; Naoki Onoto	1:44.804	QS
4	Indonesia (INA); Sayadin; Silo	1:47.508	

=== Semifinal ===
- Qualification: 1–3 → Final (QF)

Rank	Athlete	Time	Notes
1	Japan (JPN); Momotaro Matsushita; Naoki Onoto	1:45.547	QF
2	Iran (IRI); Yaser Hedayati; Mohsen Milad	1:46.355	QF
3	South Korea (KOR); Jo Hyun-goo; Lee Seung-min	1:47.171	QF
4	Kyrgyzstan (KGZ); Ilia Algin; Aleksandr Parol	1:48.351	
5	Vietnam (VIE); Nguyễn Văn Chi; Đặng Văn Thắng	1:50.155	
6	India (IND); A. Chingching Singh; N. Digvijay Singh	1:53.403	

=== Final ===
Rank	Team	Time
1st place, gold medalist(s)	Kazakhstan (KAZ); Dmitriy Torlopov; Dmitriy Kaltenberger	1:36.390
2nd place, silver medalist(s)	Uzbekistan (UZB); Sergey Borzov; Aleksey Babadjanov	1:37.202
3rd place, bronze medalist(s)	China (CHN); Li Zhen; Zhou Peng	1:37.594
4	Japan (JPN); Momotaro Matsushita; Naoki Onoto	1:38.314
5	South Korea (KOR); Jo Hyun-goo; Lee Seung-min	1:40.406
6	Iran (IRI); Yaser Hedayati; Mohsen Milad	1:41.182
