= Canoeing at the 2014 Asian Games – Men's C-2 1000 metres =

Men's canoeing competition

Men's C-2 1000 metres at the 2014 Asian Games
- Venue: Misari Regatta
- Date: 27–29 September 2014
- Competitors: 20 from 10 nations

Medalists
gold medal	Mikhail Yemelyanov; Timofey Yemelyanov	Kazakhstan
silver medal	Zheng Pengfei; Wang Riwei	China
bronze medal	Serik Mirbekov; Gerasim Kochnev	Uzbekistan

The men's C-2 1000 metres sprint canoeing competition at the 2014 Asian Games in Hanam was held from 27 to 29 September at the Misari Canoe/Kayak Center.

== Schedule ==
All times are Korea Standard Time (UTC+09:00)

Date	Time	Event
Saturday, 27 September 2014	10:40	Heats
Sunday, 28 September 2014	10:20	Semifinal
Monday, 29 September 2014	12:20	Final

== Results ==
=== Heats ===
- Qualification: 1–3 → Final (QF), Rest → Semifinal (QS)

==== Heat 1 ====
Rank	Team	Time	Notes
1	Uzbekistan (UZB); Serik Mirbekov; Gerasim Kochnev	3:51.296	QF
2	Iran (IRI); Pejman Divsalari; Kia Eskandani	4:02.478	QF
3	Indonesia (INA); Spens Stuber Mehue; Marjuki	4:02.606	QF
4	India (IND); Ajit Kumar Sha; Raju Rawat	4:02.902	QS
5	Japan (JPN); Kaito Nagai; Takayuki Kokaji	4:04.511	QS

==== Heat 2 ====
Rank	Team	Time	Notes
1	Kazakhstan (KAZ); Mikhail Yemelyanov; Timofey Yemelyanov	3:46.090	QF
2	China (CHN); Zheng Pengfei; Wang Riwei	3:48.068	QF
3	South Korea (KOR); Park Seung-jin; Gu Ja-uk	4:04.260	QF
4	Thailand (THA); Phanudet Phetmikha; Nares Naoprakon	4:14.209	QS
5	Chinese Taipei (TPE); Lai Kuan-chieh; Chien Wen-yi	4:17.197	QS

=== Semifinal ===
- Qualification: 1–3 → Final (QF)

Rank	Team	Time	Notes
1	Japan (JPN); Kaito Nagai; Takayuki Kokaji	3:55.828	QF
2	India (IND); Ajit Kumar Sha; Raju Rawat	4:02.971	QF
3	Chinese Taipei (TPE); Lai Kuan-chieh; Chien Wen-yi	4:08.093	QF
4	Thailand (THA); Phanudet Phetmikha; Nares Naoprakon	4:19.639	

=== Final ===
Rank	Team	Time
1st place, gold medalist(s)	Kazakhstan (KAZ); Mikhail Yemelyanov; Timofey Yemelyanov	3:44.936
2nd place, silver medalist(s)	China (CHN); Zheng Pengfei; Wang Riwei	3:46.250
3rd place, bronze medalist(s)	Uzbekistan (UZB); Serik Mirbekov; Gerasim Kochnev	3:47.650
4	Japan (JPN); Kaito Nagai; Takayuki Kokaji	3:57.975
5	India (IND); Ajit Kumar Sha; Raju Rawat	4:00.800
6	Chinese Taipei (TPE); Lai Kuan-chieh; Chien Wen-yi	4:03.075
7	Iran (IRI); Pejman Divsalari; Kia Eskandani	4:09.020
8	South Korea (KOR); Park Seung-jin; Gu Ja-uk	4:10.641
9	Indonesia (INA); Spens Stuber Mehue; Marjuki	4:17.739
