= Canoeing at the 2014 Asian Games – Men's K-1 1000 metres =

Men's K-1 1000 metres at the 2014 Asian Games
- Venue: Misari Regatta
- Date: 27–29 September 2014
- Competitors: 14 from 14 nations

Medalists
gold medal	Aleksey Mochalov	Uzbekistan
silver medal	Ahmad Reza Talebian	Iran
bronze medal	Yuriy Berezintsev	Kazakhstan

The men's K-1 1000 metres sprint canoeing competition at the 2014 Asian Games in Hanam was held from 27 to 29 September at the Misari Canoe/Kayak Center.

== Schedule ==
All times are Korea Standard Time (UTC+09:00)

Date	Time	Event
Saturday, 27 September 2014	10:00	Heats
Sunday, 28 September 2014	10:00	Semifinal
Monday, 29 September 2014	11:00	Final

== Results ==
=== Heats ===
- Qualification: 1–3 → Final (QF), Rest → Semifinal (QS)

==== Heat 1 ====
Rank	Athlete	Time	Notes
1	Aleksey Mochalov (UZB)	3:57.785	QF
2	Park Jeong-hoon (KOR)	4:01.207	QF
3	Kenta Chikamura (JPN)	4:02.868	QF
4	Lucas Teo (SIN)	4:05.454	QS
5	Aleksandr Parol (KGZ)	4:08.449	QS
6	Tareq Farooq (IRQ)	4:11.074	QS
7	Tokhir Nurmukhammadi (TJK)	4:15.344	QS

==== Heat 2 ====
Rank	Athlete	Time	Notes
1	Yuriy Berezintsev (KAZ)	3:53.925	QF
2	Bi Pengfei (CHN)	3:56.076	QF
3	Ahmad Reza Talebian (IRI)	4:01.819	QF
4	Lin Ya-she (TPE)	4:08.770	QS
5	Sutrisno (INA)	4:09.204	QS
6	Albert Raj Selvaraj (IND)	4:09.231	QS
7	Che Man Tou (MAC)	4:58.921	QS

=== Semifinal ===
- Qualification: 1–3 → Final (QF)

Rank	Athlete	Time	Notes
1	Lucas Teo (SIN)	3:56.560	QF
2	Aleksandr Parol (KGZ)	3:57.204	QF
3	Albert Raj Selvaraj (IND)	3:58.234	QF
4	Lin Ya-she (TPE)	3:59.279	
5	Tareq Farooq (IRQ)	4:01.511	
6	Sutrisno (INA)	4:06.299	
7	Tokhir Nurmukhammadi (TJK)	4:09.315	
8	Che Man Tou (MAC)	4:54.586	

=== Final ===
Rank	Athlete	Time
1st place, gold medalist(s)	Aleksey Mochalov (UZB)	3:39.878
2nd place, silver medalist(s)	Ahmad Reza Talebian (IRI)	3:44.155
3rd place, bronze medalist(s)	Yuriy Berezintsev (KAZ)	3:48.711
4	Bi Pengfei (CHN)	3:49.652
5	Kenta Chikamura (JPN)	3:54.125
6	Park Jeong-hoon (KOR)	3:54.436
7	Lucas Teo (SIN)	3:54.657
8	Albert Raj Selvaraj (IND)	3:59.933
9	Aleksandr Parol (KGZ)	4:02.380
