= Canoeing at the 2006 Asian Games – Women's K-2 500 metres =

Women's K-2 500 metres at the 2006 Asian Games
- Venue: West Bay Lagoon
- Date: 13–14 December 2006
- Competitors: 14 from 7 nations

Medalists
gold medal	Zhu Minyuan; Yu Lamei	China
silver medal	Shinobu Kitamoto; Mikiko Takeya	Japan
bronze medal	Lee Sun-ja; Lee Ae-yeon	South Korea

The women's K-2 500 metres sprint canoeing competition at the 2006 Asian Games in Doha was held on 13 and 14 December at the West Bay Lagoon.

== Schedule ==
All times are Arabia Standard Time (UTC+03:00)

Date	Time	Event
Wednesday, 13 December 2006	11:00	Heats
Wednesday, 13 December 2006	14:50	Semifinal
Thursday, 14 December 2006	15:30	Final

== Results ==
=== Heats ===
- Qualification: 1 → Final (QF), Rest → Semifinal (QS)

==== Heat 1 ====
Rank	Athlete	Time	Notes
1	Iran (IRI); Sonia Nourizad; Elaheh Kharazmi	2:12.843	QF
2	China (CHN); Zhu Minyuan; Yu Lamei	2:14.747	QS
3	Uzbekistan (UZB); Ekaterina Shubina; Yuliya Borzova	2:15.399	QS
4	Vietnam (VIE); Nguyễn Thị Loan; Đoàn Thị Cách	2:15.747	QS

==== Heat 2 ====
Rank	Athlete	Time	Notes
1	Kazakhstan (KAZ); Olga Shmelyova; Anna Cheboxarova	2:00.526	QF
2	South Korea (KOR); Lee Sun-ja; Lee Ae-yeon	2:41.146	QS
3	Japan (JPN); Shinobu Kitamoto; Mikiko Takeya	2:42.406	QS

=== Semifinal ===
- Qualification: 1–4 → Final (QF)

Rank	Athlete	Time	Notes
1	Uzbekistan (UZB); Ekaterina Shubina; Yuliya Borzova	2:08.408	QF
2	China (CHN); Zhu Minyuan; Yu Lamei	2:09.340	QF
3	Japan (JPN); Shinobu Kitamoto; Mikiko Takeya	2:10.356	QF
4	South Korea (KOR); Lee Sun-ja; Lee Ae-yeon	2:11.008	QF
5	Vietnam (VIE); Nguyễn Thị Loan; Đoàn Thị Cách	2:12.620	

=== Final ===
Rank	Team	Time
1st place, gold medalist(s)	China (CHN); Zhu Minyuan; Yu Lamei	1:46.901
2nd place, silver medalist(s)	Japan (JPN); Shinobu Kitamoto; Mikiko Takeya	1:47.385
3rd place, bronze medalist(s)	South Korea (KOR); Lee Sun-ja; Lee Ae-yeon	1:48.649
4	Uzbekistan (UZB); Ekaterina Shubina; Yuliya Borzova	1:49.649
5	Kazakhstan (KAZ); Olga Shmelyova; Anna Cheboxarova	1:50.433
6	Iran (IRI); Sonia Nourizad; Elaheh Kharazmi	1:54.997
