= Ayaka Kuno =

Japanese sprint canoer

Medal record

Women's sprint canoe

Representing Japan

Asian Championships
Silver medal – second place	2007 Hwacheon	K-4 200 m
Silver medal – second place	2009 Tehran	K-2 500 m
Bronze medal – third place	2005 Putrajaya	K-4 200 m
Bronze medal – third place	2007 Hwacheon	K-4 500 m
Bronze medal – third place	2007 Hwacheon	K-4 1000 m
Bronze medal – third place	2009 Tehran	K-1 500 m
Bronze medal – third place	2009 Tehran	K-2 1000 m

Ayaka Kuno (久野綾香, Kuno Ayaka; born 8 December 1987 in Nihommatsu) is a Japanese sprint canoer who competed in the late 2000s. At the 2008 Summer Olympics in Beijing, she finished sixth in the K-4 500 m event.
