= Canoeing at the 2006 Asian Games – Men's K-1 1000 metres =

Men's K-1 1000 metres at the 2006 Asian Games
- Venue: West Bay Lagoon
- Date: 10–11 December 2006
- Competitors: 16 from 16 nations

Medalists
gold medal	Liu Haitao	China
silver medal	Aleksey Babadjanov	Uzbekistan
bronze medal	Moon Chul-wook	South Korea

The men's K-1 1000 metres sprint canoeing competition at the 2006 Asian Games in Doha was held on 10 and 11 December at the West Bay Lagoon.

== Schedule ==
All times are Arabia Standard Time (UTC+03:00)

Date	Time	Event
Sunday, 10 December 2006	09:00	Heats
Sunday, 10 December 2006	14:00	Semifinal
Monday, 11 December 2006	14:00	Final

== Results ==
Legend

- DNS — Did not start

=== Heats ===
- Qualification: 1 → Final (QF), 2–3 → Semifinal (QS)

==== Heat 1 ====
Rank	Athlete	Time	Notes
1	A. Chingching Singh (IND)	4:30.938	QF
2	Lou Kuok Hei (MAC)	4:46.558	QS
3	Alexandr Yemelyanov (KAZ)	4:47.838	QS
4	Lo Ho Yin (HKG)	4:52.018	
—	Enkhtöriin Tüvshintör (MGL)	DNS	

==== Heat 2 ====
Rank	Athlete	Time	Notes
1	Yaser Hedayati (IRI)	4:17.899	QF
2	Masashi Saiki (JPN)	4:18.847	QS
3	Moon Chul-wook (KOR)	4:20.359	QS
4	Marvin Amposta (PHI)	4:21.139	
5	Silo (INA)	4:38.787	
—	Mohammed Al-Badr (QAT)	DNS	

==== Heat 3 ====
Rank	Athlete	Time	Notes
1	Liu Haitao (CHN)	4:12.770	QF
2	Aleksey Babadjanov (UZB)	4:19.758	QS
3	Trần Hữu Trí (VIE)	4:29.914	QS
4	Aleksandr Stepanov (KGZ)	4:33.378	
5	Ali Abdul-Latif (IRQ)	4:36.942	

=== Semifinal ===
- Qualification: 1–3 → Final (QF)

Rank	Athlete	Time	Notes
1	Alexandr Yemelyanov (KAZ)	3:59.067	QF
2	Aleksey Babadjanov (UZB)	4:03.083	QF
3	Moon Chul-wook (KOR)	4:04.031	QF
4	Masashi Saiki (JPN)	4:04.059	
5	Trần Hữu Trí (VIE)	4:15.851	
6	Lou Kuok Hei (MAC)	4:49.027	

=== Final ===
Rank	Athlete	Time
1st place, gold medalist(s)	Liu Haitao (CHN)	4:25.136
2nd place, silver medalist(s)	Aleksey Babadjanov (UZB)	4:27.776
3rd place, bronze medalist(s)	Moon Chul-wook (KOR)	4:30.796
4	Alexandr Yemelyanov (KAZ)	4:33.824
5	Yaser Hedayati (IRI)	4:43.884
6	A. Chingching Singh (IND)	5:13.110
