= Yang Yali =

Chinese canoeist

Medal record

Women's canoe sprint

Representing China

World Championships
Silver medal – second place	2006 Szeged	K-2 1000 m
Silver medal – second place	2007 Duisburg	K-4 1000 m

Asian Championships
Gold medal – first place	2005 Putrajaya	K-2 500 m
Gold medal – first place	2005 Putrajaya	K-2 1000 m
Gold medal – first place	2007 Hwacheon	K-4 200 m
Gold medal – first place	2007 Hwacheon	K-4 500 m
Gold medal – first place	2007 Hwacheon	K-4 1000 m

Yang Yali is a Chinese sprint canoer who has competed since the mid-2000s. She won two silver medals at the ICF Canoe Sprint World Championships, with one in the K-2 1000 m (2006), as well as one in the K-4 1000 m (2007) events.
