= Li Yue (canoeist) =

Chinese canoeist

Personal information
- Native name: 李悦
- Nationality: Chinese
- Born: October 27, 1993 (age 32)

Sport
- Sport: Canoeing
Medal record
Women's canoe sprint
Representing China
Asian Championships
| Silver medal – second place | 2015 Palembang | K-1 200 m |

Li Yue (Chinese: 李悦; pinyin: Lǐ Yuè; born October 27, 1993) is a Chinese canoeist. She competed at the 2016 Summer Olympics as a member of the Chinese boat in the women's K-4 500 metres race.
