= Canoeing at the 2010 Asian Games – Men's K-1 1000 metres =

Men's K-1 1000 metres at the 2010 Asian Games
- Venue: Guangzhou International Rowing Centre
- Date: 22–25 November 2010
- Competitors: 12 from 12 nations

Medalists
gold medal	Ahmad Reza Talebian	Iran
silver medal	Pan Yao	China
bronze medal	Yasuhiro Suzuki	Japan
bronze medal	Aleksandr Parol	Kyrgyzstan

The men's K-1 1000 metres sprint canoeing competition at the 2010 Asian Games in Guangzhou was held from 22 to 25 November at the International Rowing Centre.

== Schedule ==
All times are China Standard Time (UTC+08:00)

Date	Time	Event
Monday, 22 November 2010	10:00	Heats
Tuesday, 23 November 2010	10:00	Semifinal
Thursday, 25 November 2010	10:00	Final

== Results ==
Legend

- DNF — Did not finish

=== Heats ===
- Qualification: 1–3 → Final (QF), Rest → Semifinal (QS)

==== Heat 1 ====
Rank	Athlete	Time	Notes
1	Ahmad Reza Talebian (IRI)	3:36.531	QF
2	Andrey Pekut (UZB)	3:42.606	QF
3	Pan Yao (CHN)	3:46.709	QF
4	Seo Tae-won (KOR)	3:50.354	QS
5	Lam U Teng (MAC)	4:51.342	QS
—	Baldangombyn Pürevsüren (MGL)	DNF	

==== Heat 2 ====
Rank	Athlete	Time	Notes
1	Yasuhiro Suzuki (JPN)	3:38.457	QF
2	Aleksandr Parol (KGZ)	3:43.772	QF
3	Yegor Sergeyev (KAZ)	3:50.894	QF
4	Wichan Jaitieng (THA)	3:55.550	QS
5	Bhupender Singh (IND)	3:57.275	QS
6	Alex Generalo (PHI)	4:06.187	QS

=== Semifinal ===
- Qualification: 1–3 → Final (QF)

Rank	Athlete	Time	Notes
1	Seo Tae-won (KOR)	3:50.060	QF
2	Wichan Jaitieng (THA)	3:52.703	QF
3	Bhupender Singh (IND)	3:57.863	QF
4	Alex Generalo (PHI)	4:01.967	
5	Lam U Teng (MAC)	4:54.323	

=== Final ===
Rank	Athlete	Time
1st place, gold medalist(s)	Ahmad Reza Talebian (IRI)	3:34.256
2nd place, silver medalist(s)	Pan Yao (CHN)	3:38.160
3rd place, bronze medalist(s)	Yasuhiro Suzuki (JPN)	3:38.498
3rd place, bronze medalist(s)	Aleksandr Parol (KGZ)	3:38.498
5	Andrey Pekut (UZB)	3:42.776
6	Yegor Sergeyev (KAZ)	3:48.197
7	Wichan Jaitieng (THA)	3:52.437
8	Seo Tae-won (KOR)	3:52.619
9	Bhupender Singh (IND)	3:58.626
