= Yevgeniy Alexeyev (canoeist) =

Kazakhstani canoeist (born 1977)

Personal information
- Full name: Yevgeniy Petrovich Alexeyev
- Nationality: Kazakhstani
- Born: December 11, 1977 (age 48) Shymkent, Kazakh SSR, Soviet Union
- Height: 185 cm (6 ft 1 in)
- Weight: 85 kg (187 lb)

Sport
- Sport: Canoeing
- Event: Sprint canoe
- Club: CSKA Almaty
Medal record
Men's canoe sprint
Representing Kazakhstan
Asian Games
| Gold medal – first place | 2002 Busan | K-4 500m |
| Gold medal – first place | 2014 Incheon | K-2 1000m |
| Gold medal – first place | 2018 Jakarta-Palembang | K-4 500m |
| Silver medal – second place | 2002 Busan | K-4 1000m |
| Silver medal – second place | 2010 Guangzhou | K-4 1000m |
| Silver medal – second place | 2014 Incheon | K-2 200m |
| Bronze medal – third place | 2006 Doha | K-2 1000m |
Asian Championships
| Gold medal – first place | 2007 Hwacheon | K-2 1000 m |
| Gold medal – first place | 2009 Tehran | K-4 1000 m |
| Gold medal – first place | 2011 Tehran | K-2 1000 m |
| Gold medal – first place | 2013 Samarkand | K-2 200 m |
| Gold medal – first place | 2013 Samarkand | K-2 500 m |
| Gold medal – first place | 2013 Samarkand | K-2 1000 m |
| Gold medal – first place | 2015 Palembang | K-2 1000 m |
| Silver medal – second place | 2005 Putrajaya | K-4 1000 m |
| Silver medal – second place | 2007 Hwacheon | K-1 200 m |
| Silver medal – second place | 2007 Hwacheon | K-4 500 m |
| Silver medal – second place | 2009 Tehran | K-1 5000 m |
| Silver medal – second place | 2009 Tehran | K-4 500 m |

Yevgeniy Petrovich Alexeyev (Kazakh: Евгений Петрович Алексеев; born 11 December 1977 in Shymkent) is a Kazakhstani sprint canoeist. He won a gold medal, as a member of the Kazakhstan men's kayak four, at the 2002 Asian Games in Busan, South Korea, and silver at the 2010 Asian Games in Guangzhou, China. He also captured a bronze medal, along with his partner Alexey Podoinikov in the men's kayak doubles (1000 m) at the 2006 Asian Games in Doha, Qatar.

Alexeyev qualified for the men's K-2 1000 metres at the 2012 Summer Olympics in London by placing first from the 2011 Asian Canoe Sprint Championships in Tehran, Iran. Alexeyev and his partner Alexey Dergunov paddled to a third-place finish, and eleventh overall in the B-final by approximately two seconds behind the winning Danish pair Kim Wraae Knudsen and Emil Stær Simensen, posting their best Olympic time of 3:14.867. Three days later, the Kazakh pair edged out Japan's Momotaro Matsushita and Hiroki Watanabe for first place by twenty-four hundredths of a second (0.24), in the B-final of the men's K-2 200 metres, clocking at 35.494 seconds.
