= Huang Maoxing =

Chinese canoeist

Personal information
- Native name: 黄茂兴
- Nationality: Chinese
- Born: 16 June 1990 (age 36) Chaozhou, Guangdong, China
- Height: 1.86 m (6 ft 1 in)
- Weight: 92 kg (203 lb)

Sport
- Country: China
- Sport: Canoe sprint
Medal record
Women's canoe sprint
Representing China
Asian Championships
Gold medal – first place	2011 Tehran	C-2 1000 m
Gold medal – first place	2011 Tehran	C-4 1000 m
Silver medal – second place	2013 Samarkand	C-2 200 m
Silver medal – second place	2013 Samarkand	C-2 1000 m
Bronze medal – third place	2013 Samarkand	C-2 500 m

Huang Maoxing (Chinese: 黄茂兴; born 16 June 1990 in Chaozhou, Guangdong) is a Chinese sprint canoeist. At the 2012 Summer Olympics, he competed in the Men's C-2 1000 metres with Li Qiang.
