= Danila Turchin =

Uzbekistani canoeist (born 1978)

Medal record

Men's canoe sprint

Representing Kazakhstan

Asian Championships
Gold medal – first place	2005 Putrajaya	K-4 500 m
Gold medal – first place	2005 Putrajaya	K-4 1000 m
Bronze medal – third place	2009 Tehran	K-4 200 m

Danila Turchin (born January 22, 1978) is an Uzbekistani sprint canoer who competed in the mid-2000s. At the 2004 Summer Olympics in Athens, he was eliminated in the semifinals of both the K-1 1000 m and the K-2 1000 m events.
