= Olga Umaralieva =

Uzbekistani sprint canoeist (born 1988)

Medal record

Women's canoe sprint

Representing Uzbekistan

Asian Championships
Gold medal – first place	2015 Palembang	K-1 200 m
Silver medal – second place	2005 Putrajaya	K-4 200 m
Silver medal – second place	2005 Putrajaya	K-4 500 m
Bronze medal – third place	2005 Putrajaya	K-4 1000 m
Bronze medal – third place	2009 Tehran	K-4 1000 m
Bronze medal – third place	2013 Samarkand	K-1 200 m
Bronze medal – third place	2013 Samarkand	K-4 500 m

Olga Umaralieva (born February 5, 1988) is an Uzbekistani sprint canoeist. She competed at the 2016 Summer Olympics in the women's K-1 200 metres event but did not advance past the heats.
