= Wang Riwei =

Chinese canoeist

Personal information
- Native name: 王日炜
- Nationality: Chinese
- Born: 21 March 1993 (age 33) Huadu, Guangzhou
- Education: Jiuhu Primary School, Huadu district
- Height: 1.82 m (6 ft 0 in)
- Weight: 85 kg (187 lb)

Sport
- Country: China
- Sport: sprint canoeing
Medal record
Asian Games
| Silver medal – second place | 2014 Incheon | C-2 1,000 m |
Asian Championships
| Silver medal – second place | 2015 Palembang | C1 1,000 m |
| Silver medal – second place | 2013 Samarkand | C1 1,000 m |
| Silver medal – second place | 2013 Samarkand | C1 5,000 m |

Wang Riwei
- Traditional Chinese: 王日煒
- Simplified Chinese: 王日炜
Transcriptions
Standard Mandarin
- Hanyu Pinyin: Wáng Rì Wéi

Wang Riwei (simplified Chinese: 王日炜; traditional Chinese: 王日煒; pinyin: Wáng Rì Wéi; born 21 March 1993 in Guangzhou) is a Chinese male sprint canoeist. He won the silver medal in the C1 1000 metre canoeing event at the 2015 Asian Canoe Sprint Championships in Palembang, Indonesia, and qualified for the Rio 2016 Olympics.

On August 4, 2016, the Chinese canoeing team arrived in Rio de Janeiro from São Paulo; during the night, Wang Riwei felt blurring in his left eye. The examination result at hospital was that his left eye appeared to have a retinal detachment, and he had to give up participating in the Games.
