= Zhou Peng =

Zhou Peng may refer to:

- Zhou Peng (basketball) (born 1989), Chinese professional basketball player
- Zhou Peng (canoeist) (born 1983), Chinese canoeist
- Sa Dingding (born 1983 as Zhou Peng), Chinese singer-songwriter
