= Canoeing at the 2010 Asian Games – Men's K-1 200 metres =

Men's K-1 200 metres at the 2010 Asian Games
- Venue: Guangzhou International Rowing Centre
- Date: 22–26 November 2010
- Competitors: 16 from 16 nations

Medalists
gold medal	Momotaro Matsushita	Japan
silver medal	Zhou Peng	China
bronze medal	Aleksey Mochalov	Uzbekistan

The men's K-1 200 metres sprint canoeing competition at the 2010 Asian Games in Guangzhou was held from 22 to 26 November at the International Rowing Centre.

== Schedule ==
All times are China Standard Time (UTC+08:00)

Date	Time	Event
Monday, 22 November 2010	14:10	Heats
Tuesday, 23 November 2010	14:05	Semifinal
Frisday, 26 November 2010	10:10	Final

== Results ==
=== Heats ===
- Qualification: 1–3 → Final (QF), 4–7 + Next best time → Semifinal (QS)

==== Heat 1 ====
Rank	Athlete	Time	Notes
1	Zhou Peng (CHN)	37.435	QF
2	Dmitriy Torlopov (KAZ)	38.187	QF
3	Igor Dorofeev (KGZ)	38.460	QF
4	Amin Boudaghi (IRI)	40.554	QS
5	Prassamin Witheskosum (THA)	41.543	QS
6	Silo (INA)	41.544	QS
7	Alex Generalo (PHI)	42.141	QS
8	Tokhir Nurmukhammadi (TJK)	43.775	QS

==== Heat 2 ====
Rank	Athlete	Time	Notes
1	Momotaro Matsushita (JPN)	36.921	QF
2	Aleksey Mochalov (UZB)	37.691	QF
3	Nguyễn Thành Quang (VIE)	37.960	QF
4	Seo Tae-won (KOR)	40.873	QS
5	Pak Kyong-chol (PRK)	41.030	QS
6	N. Digvijay Singh (IND)	41.090	QS
7	Che Hon Man (MAC)	51.521	QS
8	Gankhuyagiin Erdenebulgan (MGL)	51.679	

=== Semifinal ===
- Qualification: 1–3 → Final (QF)

Rank	Athlete	Time	Notes
1	Amin Boudaghi (IRI)	38.846	QF
2	Prassamin Witheskosum (THA)	39.923	QF
3	Pak Kyong-chol (PRK)	40.026	QF
4	Seo Tae-won (KOR)	40.223	
5	N. Digvijay Singh (IND)	40.417	
6	Silo (INA)	40.446	
7	Alex Generalo (PHI)	41.503	
8	Tokhir Nurmukhammadi (TJK)	41.690	
9	Che Hon Man (MAC)	51.784	

=== Final ===
Rank	Athlete	Time
1st place, gold medalist(s)	Momotaro Matsushita (JPN)	36.279
2nd place, silver medalist(s)	Zhou Peng (CHN)	36.938
3rd place, bronze medalist(s)	Aleksey Mochalov (UZB)	36.994
4	Dmitriy Torlopov (KAZ)	37.611
5	Nguyễn Thành Quang (VIE)	37.796
6	Igor Dorofeev (KGZ)	37.842
7	Amin Boudaghi (IRI)	39.629
8	Pak Kyong-chol (PRK)	39.813
9	Prassamin Witheskosum (THA)	40.485
