= Canoeing at the 2014 Asian Games – Men's K-2 1000 metres =

Men's K-2 1000 metres at the 2014 Asian Games
- Venue: Misari Regatta
- Date: 27–29 September 2014
- Competitors: 26 from 13 nations

Medalists
gold medal	Yevgeniy Alexeyev; Alexey Dergunov	Kazakhstan
silver medal	Ali Aghamirzaei; Saeid Fazloula	Iran
bronze medal	Li Zhenyu; Sun Xinchang	China

The men's K-2 1000 metres sprint canoeing competition at the 2014 Asian Games in Hanam was held from 27 to 29 September at the Misari Canoe/Kayak Center.

== Schedule ==
All times are Korea Standard Time (UTC+09:00)

Date	Time	Event
Saturday, 27 September 2014	11:00	Heats
Sunday, 28 September 2014	10:40	Semifinal
Monday, 29 September 2014	12:00	Final

== Results ==
=== Heats ===
- Qualification: 1–3 → Final (QF), Rest → Semifinal (QS)

==== Heat 1 ====
Rank	Team	Time	Notes
1	Kazakhstan (KAZ); Yevgeniy Alexeyev; Alexey Dergunov	3:24.839	QF
2	China (CHN); Li Zhenyu; Sun Xinchang	3:27.706	QF
3	Chinese Taipei (TPE); Tuan Yen-yu; Lin Yung-chieh	3:27.777	QF
4	Indonesia (INA); Gandie; Silo	3:35.651	QS
5	North Korea (PRK); Ri Chol-song; Won Song-guk	3:37.891	QS
6	Kyrgyzstan (KGZ); Maksim Bondar; Igor Dorofeev	3:47.810	QS
7	Tajikistan (TJK); Abdusattor Gafurov; Tokhir Nurmukhammadi	3:51.308	QS

==== Heat 2 ====
Rank	Team	Time	Notes
1	Iran (IRI); Ali Aghamirzaei; Saeid Fazloula	3:25.631	QF
2	Japan (JPN); Keiji Mizumoto; Yasuhiro Suzuki	3:26.453	QF
3	Uzbekistan (UZB); Andrey Pekut; Vilyam Ibragimov	3:27.191	QF
4	South Korea (KOR); Cho Jeong-hyun; Kim Ji-won	3:28.973	QS
5	India (IND); Sunny Kumar; A. Chingching Singh	3:29.237	QS
6	Singapore (SIN); Bill Lee; Brandon Ooi	3:50.031	QS

=== Semifinal ===
- Qualification: 1–3 → Final (QF)

Rank	Team	Time	Notes
1	Singapore (SIN); Bill Lee; Brandon Ooi	3:32.938	QF
2	South Korea (KOR); Cho Jeong-hyun; Kim Ji-won	3:33.561	QF
3	North Korea (PRK); Ri Chol-song; Won Song-guk	3:35.095	QF
4	India (IND); Sunny Kumar; A. Chingching Singh	3:37.915	
5	Indonesia (INA); Gandie; Silo	3:45.955	
6	Kyrgyzstan (KGZ); Maksim Bondar; Igor Dorofeev	3:46.334	
7	Tajikistan (TJK); Abdusattor Gafurov; Tokhir Nurmukhammadi	3:47.482	

=== Final ===
Rank	Team	Time
1st place, gold medalist(s)	Kazakhstan (KAZ); Yevgeniy Alexeyev; Alexey Dergunov	3:20.012
2nd place, silver medalist(s)	Iran (IRI); Ali Aghamirzaei; Saeid Fazloula	3:23.590
3rd place, bronze medalist(s)	China (CHN); Li Zhenyu; Sun Xinchang	3:25.050
4	Japan (JPN); Keiji Mizumoto; Yasuhiro Suzuki	3:26.502
5	Uzbekistan (UZB); Andrey Pekut; Vilyam Ibragimov	3:27.204
6	Chinese Taipei (TPE); Tuan Yen-yu; Lin Yung-chieh	3:27.289
7	South Korea (KOR); Cho Jeong-hyun; Kim Ji-won	3:29.053
8	Singapore (SIN); Bill Lee; Brandon Ooi	3:31.701
9	North Korea (PRK); Ri Chol-song; Won Song-guk	3:37.166
