= Canoeing at the 2014 Asian Games – Men's K-2 200 metres =

Men's K-2 200 metres at the 2014 Asian Games
- Venue: Misari Regatta
- Date: 27–29 September 2014
- Competitors: 30 from 15 nations

Medalists
gold medal	Momotaro Matsushita; Hiroki Fujishima	Japan
silver medal	Yevgeniy Alexeyev; Alexey Dergunov	Kazakhstan
bronze medal	Zong Meng; Chu Youyong	China

The men's K-2 200 metres sprint canoeing competition at the 2014 Asian Games in Hanam was held from 27 to 29 September at the Misari Canoe/Kayak Center.

== Schedule ==
All times are Korea Standard Time (UTC+09:00)

Date	Time	Event
Saturday, 27 September 2014	14:55	Heats
Sunday, 28 September 2014	13:50	Semifinal
Monday, 29 September 2014	15:50	Final

== Results ==
=== Heats ===
- Qualification: 1–3 → Final (QF), Rest → Semifinal (QS)

==== Heat 1 ====
Rank	Team	Time	Notes
1	South Korea (KOR); Choi Min-kyu; Song Kuong-ho	31.869	QF
2	Kazakhstan (KAZ); Yevgeniy Alexeyev; Alexey Dergunov	31.934	QF
3	Singapore (SIN); Syaheenul Aiman; Mervyn Toh	32.394	QF
4	Indonesia (INA); Silo; Gandie	33.116	QS
5	Uzbekistan (UZB); Andrey Pekut; Vilyam Ibragimov	33.449	QS
6	India (IND); A. Chingching Singh; Sunny Kumar	34.863	QS
7	Tajikistan (TJK); Abdusattor Gafurov; Tokhir Nurmukhammadi	35.908	QS
8	Macau (MAC); Leong Lap Chong; Chao Man Kit	38.734	QS

==== Heat 2 ====
Rank	Team	Time	Notes
1	Japan (JPN); Momotaro Matsushita; Hiroki Fujishima	31.263	QF
2	Kyrgyzstan (KGZ); Maksim Bondar; Igor Dorofeev	32.267	QF
3	Thailand (THA); Aditep Srichart; Kasemsit Borriboonwasin	32.288	QF
4	China (CHN); Zong Meng; Chu Youyong	32.382	QS
5	Iran (IRI); Saeid Fazloula; Alireza Alimohammadi	32.454	QS
6	Hong Kong (HKG); Kwok Ka Wai; Fung Wan Him	34.758	QS
7	Chinese Taipei (TPE); Yu yin-ting Pai Hsiu-chuan	34.889	QS

=== Semifinal ===
- Qualification: 1–3 → Final (QF)

Rank	Team	Time	Notes
1	Iran (IRI); Saeid Fazloula; Alireza Alimohammadi	33.685	QF
2	China (CHN); Zong Meng; Chu Youyong	33.787	QF
3	Indonesia (INA); Silo; Gandie	34.628	QF
4	Uzbekistan (UZB); Andrey Pekut; Vilyam Ibragimov	34.821	
5	Hong Kong (HKG); Kwok Ka Wai; Fung Wan Him	35.521	
6	Chinese Taipei (TPE); Yu yin-ting Pai Hsiu-chuan	35.540	
7	India (IND); A. Chingching Singh; Sunny Kumar	37.826	
8	Tajikistan (TJK); Abdusattor Gafurov; Tokhir Nurmukhammadi	38.194	
9	Macau (MAC); Leong Lap Chong; Chao Man Kit	40.208	

=== Final ===
Rank	Team	Time
1st place, gold medalist(s)	Japan (JPN); Momotaro Matsushita; Hiroki Fujishima	32.348
2nd place, silver medalist(s)	Kazakhstan (KAZ); Yevgeniy Alexeyev; Alexey Dergunov	32.898
3rd place, bronze medalist(s)	China (CHN); Zong Meng; Chu Youyong	33.201
4	South Korea (KOR); Choi Min-kyu; Song Kuong-ho	33.220
5	Kyrgyzstan (KGZ); Maksim Bondar; Igor Dorofeev	33.297
6	Iran (IRI); Saeid Fazloula; Alireza Alimohammadi	33.306
7	Singapore (SIN); Syaheenul Aiman; Mervyn Toh	33.640
8	Indonesia (INA); Silo; Gandie	34.466
9	Thailand (THA); Aditep Srichart; Kasemsit Borriboonwasin	36.848
