= Zhou Peng (canoeist) =

Chinese sprint canoeist

Personal information
- Born: 12 September 1983 (age 42) Linghai, Jinzhou, Liaoning, China
- Height: 183 cm (6 ft 0 in)
- Weight: 88 kg (194 lb)
Medal record
Men's sprint canoe
Representing China
Asian Games
Silver medal – second place	2010 Guangzhou	K-1 200 m
Bronze medal – third place	2006 Doha	K-2 500 m
Asian Championships
Gold medal – first place	2005 Putrajaya	K-1 200 m
Gold medal – first place	2007 Hwacheon	K-1 200 m
Gold medal – first place	2007 Hwacheon	K-4 200 m
Gold medal – first place	2007 Hwacheon	K-4 500 m
Gold medal – first place	2007 Hwacheon	K-4 1000 m
Gold medal – first place	2011 Tehran	K-1 200 m
Bronze medal – third place	2005 Putrajaya	K-4 1000 m

Zhou Peng (simplified Chinese: 周鹏; traditional Chinese: 周鵬; pinyin: zhōu péng; born 12 September 1983 in Linghai, Jinzhou, Liaoning) is a Chinese sprint canoeist. Competing in the late 2000s, he finished seventh in the K-4 1000 m event at the 2008 Summer Olympics in Beijing.

He also won the silver medal in the 200m men's single kayak at the 2010 Asian Games in Guangzhou.
