= Pan Yao =

Chinese male sprint canoeist (born 1989)

Personal information
- Native name: 潘耀
- Nationality: Chinese
- Born: 27 March 1989 (age 37) Sanhe Farm, Xuyi county, Jiangsu
- Height: 1.88 m (6 ft 2 in)
- Weight: 82 kg (181 lb)

Sport
- Country: China
- Sport: Canoe sprint

Pan Yao (Chinese: 潘耀; born 1989-03-27 in Sanhe Farm, Xuyi county, Jiangsu) is a Chinese male sprint canoeist who competed in the late 2000s. At the 2008 Summer Olympics in Beijing, he was eliminated in the semifinals of both the K-1 500 m and the K-1 1000 m events.

Competing in the Guangzhou Asian Games, 2010, Pan won the silver medalist at K-1 1000 m, 4th at K-4 1000 m. His personal best was that he won the champion at k-2 1000 m in 2007 China Water Sports Games, held in Rizhao Water Sports Base.
