= Farzin Asadi =

Iranian professional sprint kayaker

Medal record

Men's sprint canoe

Representing Iran

Asian Games
Bronze medal – third place	2010 Guangzhou	K-4 1000 m

Asian Championships
Gold medal – first place	2013 Samarkand	K-4 1000 m
Gold medal – first place	2015 Palembang	K-4 1000 m
Silver medal – second place	2011 Tehran	K-4 1000 m
Silver medal – second place	2017 Shanghai	K-2 1000 m
Bronze medal – third place	2015 Palembang	K-1 1000 m

Farzin Asadi (Persian: فرزین اسدی) (born 17 January 1993) is an Iranian professional sprint kayaker. His best results were Bronze at 2010 Guangzhou China Asian Games in K-4 1000m, Gold in K-1 1000m Asian championship 2011 Tehran, Gold in K-4 1000m 2014 Asian Games in Uzbekistan, and Silver in K-2 2017 Asian Canoe Sprint Championships.
