= Ali Aghamirzaei =

Iranian canoeist (born 1993)

Personal information
- Born: 4 March 1993 (age 33) Bandar Anzali, Iran

Sport
- Country: Iran
- Sport: Canoe sprint
Medal record
Men's canoe sprint
Representing Iran
Asian Games
Silver medal – second place	2014 Incheon	K-2 1000 m
Bronze medal – third place	2018 Jakarta–Palembang	K-4 500 m
Bronze medal – third place	2026 Aichi–Nagoya	K-2 500 m
Asian Championships
Gold medal – first place	2015 Palembang	K-4 1000 m
Gold medal – first place	2022 Rayong	K-1 1000 m
Gold medal – first place	2022 Rayong	K-2 200 m
Gold medal – first place	2022 Rayong	K-2 500 m
Gold medal – first place	2022 Rayong	K-4 200 m
Gold medal – first place	2022 Rayong	K-4 500 m
Gold medal – first place	2022 Rayong	K-4 1000 m
Gold medal – first place	2025 Nanchang	K-2 500 m
Silver medal – second place	2013 Samarkand	K-2 500 m
Silver medal – second place	2013 Samarkand	K-2 1000 m
Silver medal – second place	2025 Nanchang	K-1 1000 m
Bronze medal – third place	2017 Shanghai	K-1 1000 m
Bronze medal – third place	2015 Palembang	K-2 1000 m
Bronze medal – third place	2024 Tokyo	K-1 200 m
Bronze medal – third place	2024 Tokyo	K-1 1000 m
Bronze medal – third place	2025 Nanchang	K-1 500 m

Ali Aghamirzaei Jenaghrad (Persian: علی آقامیرزایی جناقرد; born 4 March 1993 in Bandar Anzali) is an Iranian canoeist. He represented Iran at the 2020 Summer Olympics in Tokyo, competing in men's K-1 1000 metres.
