= Ning Menghua =

Chinese canoeist

Personal information
- Native name: 宁梦华
- Nationality: Chinese
- Born: 8 November 1973 (age 52) Jianjialong, Shaodong, Hunan
- Height: 1.70 m (5 ft 7 in)
- Weight: 67 kg (148 lb)

Sport
- Country: China
- Sport: female sprint canoeist
- Retired: yes
Medal record
Women's canoe sprint
Representing China
World Championships
Bronze medal – third place	1991 Paris	K-4 500 m
Asian Games
Gold medal – first place	1990 Beijing	K-4 500 m

Ning Menghua
- Traditional Chinese: 寧夢華
- Simplified Chinese: 宁梦华
Transcriptions
Standard Mandarin
- Hanyu Pinyin: Níng Mèng Huá

Ning Menghua (Chinese: 宁梦华; born November 8, 1973, in Jianjialong, Shaodong county) is a Chinese sprint canoeist who competed in the early to mid-1990s. She won a bronze medal in the K-4 500 m event at the 1991 ICF Canoe Sprint World Championships in Paris.

Ning competed in two Olympic Games, she finished 5th at K-4 500 m, 7th at K-2 500 m in 1992 Barcelona Olympics; 8th at K-2 500 m in 1996 Atlanta Olympics. She also won the gold medalist at K-4 500 m in 1990 Beijing Asian Games. As a canoeing player, Ning competed in international games, including the World Championship, World Cup, invitational tournament and domestic competitions, she won 11 gold medalists, 9 silver medalists and 9 bronze medalists. Ning received many honors, He was awarded the Pace-setters of the New Long March of Hunan and National Woman Pace-setter in 1991. Currently Ning serves as a water sports coach in Wuhan Sports University.
