= Naoya Sakamoto =

Japanese canoeist (born 1988)

Personal information
- Born: 29 June 1988 (age 38) Tanabe, Wakayama, Japan
- Height: 178 cm (5 ft 10 in)
- Weight: 83 kg (183 lb)
Medal record
Men's canoe sprint
Representing Japan
Asian Games
Silver medal – second place	2014 Incheon	C-1 200 m
Asian Championships
Silver medal – second place	2013 Samarkand	C-1 200 m
Silver medal – second place	2013 Samarkand	C-1 500 m
Bronze medal – third place	2011 Tehran	C-1 200 m

Naoya Sakamoto (Japanese: 阪本 直也; born 29 June 1988) is a Japanese male sprint canoeist. He was born in Tanabe, Wakayama.

At the 2012 Summer Olympics, he competed in the Men's C-1 200 metres.

At 2014 Asian Games he won a silver medal in the men's C-1 200 m event.
