= 2002 Asian Canoe Slalom Championships =

Canoeing competition in Karaj, Iran

- Host city: Karaj, Iran
- Dates: 20–21 May 2002
- Main venue: Karaj River

The 2002 Asian Canoe Slalom Championships were the 2nd Asian Canoe Slalom Championships and took place from May 20–21, 2002 in Karaj River, Karaj, Iran.

== Medal summary ==
Event	Gold	Silver	Bronze
Men's C-1	Seiichi Yamamoto; Japan	Masoud Khodayari; Iran	Adnan Karami; Iran
Men's C-2	Iran; Erfan Karami; Fardin Zaheri	None awarded	None awarded
Men's K-1	Aleksey Naumkin; Uzbekistan	Kohei Asano; Japan	Hamid Reza Mohammad; Iran
Women's K-1	Kiyomi Kono; Japan	Nailya Latipova; Uzbekistan	Hiroko Sasao; Japan

== Medal table ==
Rank	Nation	Gold	Silver	Bronze	Total
1	Japan	2	1	1	4
2	Iran	1	1	2	4
3	Uzbekistan	1	1	0	2
Totals (3 entries)		4	3	3	10
