= Saeid Fazloula =

Iranian canoeist (born 1992)

Personal information
- Nationality: Iranian
- Born: 9 August 1992 (age 34) Bandar-e Anzali, Iran

Sport
- Sport: Canoe sprint
Medal record
Men's canoe sprint
Representing Iran
Asian Games
Silver medal – second place	2014 Incheon	K2 1000 m
Asian Championships
Silver medal – second place	2013 Samarkand	K2 500 m
Silver medal – second place	2013 Samarkand	K2 1000 m
Bronze medal – third place	2011 Tehran	K2 1000 m
Bronze medal – third place	2013 Samarkand	K2 200 m

Saeid Fazloula (Persian: سعید فضل‌اولی; born 9 August 1992) is an Iranian retired canoeist who now lives in Germany after fleeing Iran in 2015. He competed in the men's K-1 1000 metres event at the 2020 Summer Olympics and as well as at the 2024 Summer Olympics. Both times, he represented the IOC Refugee Olympic Team (ROT), being the first canoeist on the ROT. Previously, while representing Iran, he was a silver medalist at the Asian Championships and the 2014 Asian Games.

== Career ==
Fazloula won several silver medals at the Asian Canoeing Championships while competing for Iran. In 2014, he won a silver medal at the 2014 Asian Games.

In 2015, he took a photo in front of Milan Cathedral. When he returned home, he was detained, accused of having converted to Christianity, and threatened with the death penalty. Fazloula chose to flee Iran and made his way through the Balkans to Germany.

Fazloula adjusted to life in Germany with the help of fellow canoeists, including his coach Detlef Hofmann. Due to his prior success while competing for Iran, his official situation was complicated, and his case caused the International Canoe Federation to change their rules to account for athletes who were forced to leave their country.

At the 2018 ICF Canoe Sprint World Championships, he and Kostja Stroinski placed 8th in the men's K-2 500 metres.

In June 2021, he was named to the Refugee Olympic Team. He competed in the men's K-1 1000 metres even at the 2020 Summer Olympics. There he advanced to the quarterfinals and placed fourth in his section with a time of 3:52.614.

Speaking about his position on the Refugee Olympic Team, he said, "It's just sad that we are 120 million refugees around the world because of false polity, because of war, because of religions, skin color," but added that he was proud to represent refugees and show that "we are many athletes, we are many doctors, we are many architects".

Fazloula also competed in the 2024 Summer Olympics, again as a member of the Refugee Olympic Team. He finished fourth in his quarterfinal of the men's K-1 1000 meters event. He announced that it was his last race and he was retiring from competition.
