= Ilya Golendov =

Kazakhstani canoeist (born 1994)

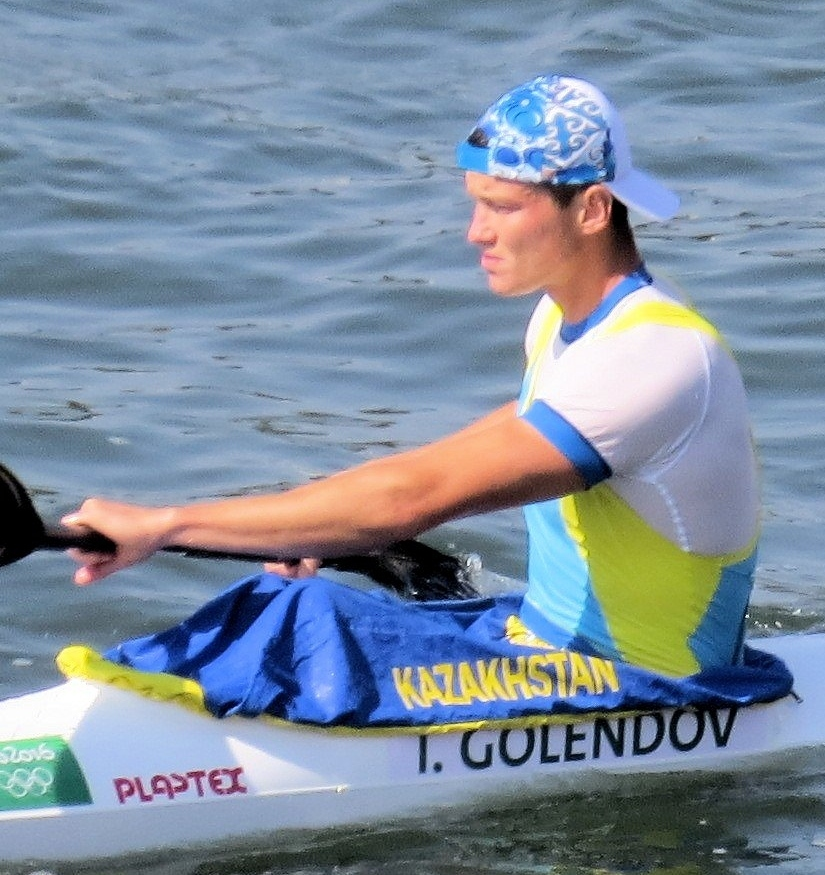
- Golendov at the 2016 Olympics

Personal information
- Born: 2 October 1994 (age 32) Jezkazgan, Kazakhstan
- Education: Kazakh Academy of Sport and Tourism
- Height: 185 cm (6 ft 1 in)
- Weight: 87 kg (192 lb)

Sport
- Sport: Canoe sprint
- Club: Dynamo Almaty
- Coached by: Sergey Koptev (personal); Dmitry Torlopov (personal); Andrey Shantarovich (national)
Medal record
Representing Kazakhstan
Asian Games
| Gold medal – first place | 2014 Incheon | K-4 1000 m |
| Gold medal – first place | 2018 Jakarta-Palembang | K-4 500m |
| Silver medal – second place | 2018 Jakarta-Palembang | K-2 1000m |
Asian Championships
| Gold medal – first place | 2017 Shanghai | K-2 1000 m |
| Gold medal – first place | 2017 Shanghai | K-4 500 m |
| Bronze medal – third place | 2013 Samarkand | K-4 1000 m |
| Bronze medal – third place | 2017 Shanghai | K-4 1000 m |

Ilya Golendov (Russian: Илья Голендов, born 2 October 1994) is a Kazakhstani canoeist. Competing in the four-man K-4 1000 m event he won a gold medal at the 2014 Asian Games and placed tenth at the 2016 Olympics.

Golendov was introduced to kayaking by his mother in 2004, and in 2011 was included to the national team. His wife Svetlana Golendova (Ivanchukova) is a sprint runner and won a gold medal in the 4 × 100 m relay at the 2015 World University Games.
