= Hiroki Watanabe =

Japanese canoeist

Personal information
- Nationality: Japan
- Born: 23 May 1988 (age 38)
- Height: 1.78 m (5 ft 10 in)
- Weight: 80 kg (176 lb)

Sport
- Sport: Canoeing
- Event: Sprint canoe
Medal record
Men's canoe sprint
Representing Japan
Asian Games
Bronze medal – third place	2010 Guangzhou	K-2 1000 m
Asian Championships
Gold medal – first place	2011 Tehran	K-2 200 m
Gold medal – first place	2013 Samarkand	K-1 200 m

Hiroki Watanabe (渡辺大規, Watanabe Hiroki; born May 23, 1988) is a Japanese sprint canoeist born in Yamanashi prefecture. He won a bronze medal, along with his partner Keiji Mizumoto, in the men's kayak doubles (1000 m) at the 2010 Asian Games in Guangzhou, China.

Watanabe qualified for the men's K-2 200 metres at the 2012 Summer Olympics in London by placing first at the 2011 Asian Canoe Sprint Championships in Tehran, Iran. Watanabe and his partner Momotaro Matsushita paddled to a second-place finish, and tenth overall in the B-final by twenty-four hundredths of a second (0.24) behind the Kazakh pair Alexey Dergunov and Yevgeniy Alexeyev, posting their time of 35.739 seconds.
