= 2013 Asian Canoe Sprint Championships =

Canoeing competition in Samarkand, Uzbekistan

- Host city: Samarkand, Uzbekistan
- Dates: 26–29 September 2013

The 2013 Asian Canoe Sprint Championships were the 15th Asian Canoe Sprint Championships and took place from September 26–29, 2013 in Samarkand, Uzbekistan.

== Medal summary ==
=== Men ===
Event	Gold	Silver	Bronze
C-1 200 m	Mirziyodjon Khojiev; Uzbekistan	Naoya Sakamoto; Japan	Li Qiang; China
C-1 500 m	Vadim Menkov; Uzbekistan	Naoya Sakamoto; Japan	Merey Medetov; Kazakhstan
C-1 1000 m	Vadim Menkov; Uzbekistan	Wang Riwei; China	Adel Mojallali; Iran
C-1 5000 m	Adel Mojallali; Iran	Wang Riwei; China	Ildar Kayumov; Uzbekistan
C-2 200 m	Kazakhstan; Mikhail Yemelyanov; Timofey Yemelyanov	China; Huang Maoxing; Li Qiang	Uzbekistan; Serik Mirbekov; Gerasim Kochnev
C-2 500 m	Uzbekistan; Serik Mirbekov; Gerasim Kochnev	Kazakhstan; Mikhail Yemelyanov; Timofey Yemelyanov	China; Huang Maoxing; Li Qiang
C-2 1000 m	Uzbekistan; Serik Mirbekov; Gerasim Kochnev	China; Huang Maoxing; Li Qiang	Kazakhstan; Maxim Sinyavskiy; Yevgeniy Safronov
C-4 1000 m	Uzbekistan; Ildar Kayumov; Nurislom Tukhtasin Ugli; Dilshod Yuldashov; Murod Azmetov	Kazakhstan; Maxim Sinyavskiy; Vladimir Petrov; Andrey Shpak; Yevgeniy Safronov	Iran; Pejman Divsalari; Kia Eskandani; Ali Bajelan; Mohsen Saadatkhah
K-1 200 m	Hiroki Watanabe; Japan	Alireza Alimohammadi; Iran	Ruslan Moltaev; Kyrgyzstan
K-1 500 m	Aleksey Mochalov; Uzbekistan	Alexandr Yemelyanov; Kazakhstan	Yasuhiro Suzuki; Japan
K-1 1000 m	Aleksey Mochalov; Uzbekistan	Ahmad Reza Talebian; Iran	Alexandr Yemelyanov; Kazakhstan
K-1 5000 m	Ahmad Reza Talebian; Iran	Sergey Borzov; Uzbekistan	Ajit Singh; India
K-2 200 m	Kazakhstan; Yevgeniy Alexeyev; Alexey Dergunov	Kyrgyzstan; Igor Dorofeev; Maksim Bondar	Iran; Saeid Fazloula; Alireza Alimohammadi
K-2 500 m	Kazakhstan; Yevgeniy Alexeyev; Alexey Dergunov	Iran; Ali Aghamirzaei; Saeid Fazloula	Uzbekistan; Vilyam Ibragimov; Vladimir Zibkin
K-2 1000 m	Kazakhstan; Yevgeniy Alexeyev; Alexey Dergunov	Iran; Ali Aghamirzaei; Saeid Fazloula	Uzbekistan; Vilyam Ibragimov; Vladimir Zibkin
K-4 1000 m	Iran; Ahmad Reza Talebian; Hamid Reza Torki; Farzin Asadi; Amin Boudaghi	Uzbekistan; Sergey Borzov; Vyacheslav Gorn; Aleksey Mochalov; Aleksandr Tropin	Kazakhstan; Pavel Samoilyuk; Daulet Sultanbekov; Ilya Golendov; Yuriy Berezintsev

=== Women ===
Event	Gold	Silver	Bronze
C-1 200 m	Yulia Tsoy; Uzbekistan	Nadia Talanak; Iran	Anna Kulikova; Kazakhstan
C-1 500 m	Nadia Talanak; Iran	Anna Kulikova; Kazakhstan	Ekaterina Zarkova; Uzbekistan
C-2 200 m	Iran; Nadia Talanak; Masoumeh Danapour	Uzbekistan; Yulia Tsoy; Ekaterina Zarkova	India; Nithya Kuriakose; Betty Joseph
C-2 500 m	Uzbekistan; Yulia Tsoy; Ekaterina Zarkova	Iran; Nadia Talanak; Masoumeh Danapour	India; Betty Joseph; Anjali Bashishth
K-1 200 m	Inna Klinova; Kazakhstan	Wu Yanan; China	Olga Umaralieva; Uzbekistan
K-1 500 m	Zhou Yu; China	Hedieh Kazemi; Iran	Natalya Sergeyeva; Kazakhstan
K-1 1000 m	Zhou Yu; China	Natalya Sergeyeva; Kazakhstan	Hedieh Kazemi; Iran
K-1 5000 m	Liu Haiping; China	Irina Podoinikova; Kazakhstan	Maria Gorn; Uzbekistan
K-2 200 m	China; Yu Lamei; Zhao Dongmei	Kazakhstan; Natalya Sergeyeva; Inna Klinova	Uzbekistan; Ekaterina Shubina; Kseniya Kochneva
K-2 500 m	China; Yu Lamei; Zhao Dongmei	Kazakhstan; Natalya Sergeyeva; Inna Klinova	Uzbekistan; Ekaterina Shubina; Kseniya Kochneva
K-2 1000 m	China; Yu Lamei; Zhao Dongmei	Japan; Shiho Kakizaki; Asumi Omura	Kazakhstan; Irina Podoinikova; Tatyana Kanivets
K-4 500 m	Kazakhstan; Inna Klinova; Irina Podoinikova; Natalya Sergeyeva; Tatyana Kanivets	China; Ren Wenjun; Liu Haiping; Cui Wei; Gai Xiaomei	Uzbekistan; Olga Umaralieva; Kseniya Kalinina; Ekaterina Shubina; Kseniya Kochneva

== Medal table ==
Rank	Nation	Gold	Silver	Bronze	Total
1	Uzbekistan	10	3	10	23
2	Kazakhstan	6	8	7	21
3	China	6	6	2	14
4	Iran	5	7	4	16
5	Japan	1	3	1	5
6	Kyrgyzstan	0	1	1	2
7	India	0	0	3	3
Totals (7 entries)		28	28	28	84
