= Liu Haiping =

Chinese canoeist

Personal information
- Nationality: China
- Born: 3 June 1988 (age 38) Shouguang, Shandong
- Height: 1.74 m (5 ft 9 in)
- Weight: 72 kg (159 lb)

Sport
- Sport: Canoeing
- Event: Sprint canoe
- Club: Shandong Sports Club
- Coached by: Wu Yubiao
Medal record
Women's sprint canoe
Representing China
Asian Championships
Gold medal – first place	2011 Tehran	K-1 1000 m
Gold medal – first place	2013 Samarkand	K-1 5000 m
Gold medal – first place	2015 Palembang	K-4 500 m
Gold medal – first place	2017 Shanghai	K-4 200 m
Gold medal – first place	2017 Shanghai	K-4 500 m
Silver medal – second place	2013 Samarkand	K-4 500 m
Silver medal – second place	2017 Shanghai	K-2 200 m

Liu Haiping (simplified Chinese: 刘海萍; traditional Chinese: 劉海萍; pinyin: Liú Hǎipíng; born June 3, 1988, in Shouguang, Shandong) is a Chinese female canoeist. She competed at the 2012 London Olympics and 2016 Rio Olympics in the k-4 500 m event.
