= Lin Miao =

Chinese sprint canoer (born 1986)

Personal information
- Native name: 林淼
- Nationality: Chinese
- Born: 9 April 1986 (age 40) Dandong, Liaoning
- Height: 1.88 m (6 ft 2 in)
- Weight: 90 kg (200 lb)

Sport
- Country: China
- Sport: male sprint canoeist
- Club: Sichuan
Medal record
Men's canoe sprint
Representing China
Asian Championships
Gold medal – first place	2007 Hwacheon	K-4 200 m
Gold medal – first place	2007 Hwacheon	K-4 500 m
Gold medal – first place	2007 Hwacheon	K-4 1000 m

Lin Miao (Chinese: 林淼; born April 9, 1983, in Dandong, Liaoning) is a Chinese sprint canoer who has competed since the late 2000s. He finished seventh in the K-4 1000 m event at the 2008 Summer Olympics in Beijing.
