= Mikiko Takeya =

Japanese canoeist

Medal record

Women's canoe sprint

Representing Japan

Asian Championships
Gold medal – first place	2005 Putrajaya	K-2 200 m
Silver medal – second place	2005 Putrajaya	K-2 500 m
Bronze medal – third place	2005 Putrajaya	K-2 1000 m

Mikiko Takeya (竹屋 美紀子, Takeya Mikiko; born June 19, 1980) is a Japanese sprint canoer who has competed since the mid-2000s. Competing in two Summer Olympics, she earned her best finish of fifth in the K-2 500 m event at Beijing in 2008.
