= Zhu Minyuan =

Chinese canoeist

Medal record

Women's canoe sprint

Representing China

World Championships
Silver medal – second place	2006 Szeged	K-2 1000 m

Asian Championships
Gold medal – first place	2005 Putrajaya	K-4 200 m
Gold medal – first place	2005 Putrajaya	K-4 500 m
Gold medal – first place	2007 Hwacheon	K-2 200 m
Gold medal – first place	2007 Hwacheon	K-2 500 m
Gold medal – first place	2007 Hwacheon	K-2 1000 m

Zhu Minyuan is a Chinese sprint canoer. She has competed since the mid-2000s, and won a silver medal in the K-2 1000 m event at the 2006 ICF Canoe Sprint World Championships in Szeged.
