= 2015 Asian Canoe Sprint Championships =

Canoeing competition in Palembang, Indonesia

- Host city: Palembang, Indonesia
- Dates: 4–7 November 2015
- Main venue: Jakabaring Lake

The 2015 Asian Canoe Sprint Championships were the 16th Asian Canoe Sprint Championships and took place from November 4–7, 2015 in Palembang, Indonesia.

== Medal summary ==
=== Men ===
Event	Gold	Silver	Bronze
C-1 200 m	Timur Khaidarov; Kazakhstan	Artur Guliev; Uzbekistan	Adel Mojallali; Iran
C-1 1000 m	Gerasim Kochnev; Uzbekistan	Wang Riwei; China	Choi Ji-sung; South Korea
C-2 200 m	Uzbekistan; Elyorjon Mamadaliev; Mirziyodjon Khojiev	Indonesia; Spens Stuber Mehue; Marjuki	Iran; Ali Ojaghi; Kia Eskandani
C-2 1000 m	Uzbekistan; Vadim Menkov; Serik Mirbekov	China; Zheng Pengfei; Wang Longkui	Kazakhstan; Sergey Yemelyanov; Timofey Yemelyanov
K-1 200 m	Sergii Tokarnytskyi; Kazakhstan	Cho Gwang-hee; South Korea	Mervyn Toh; Singapore
K-1 1000 m	Aleksey Mochalov; Uzbekistan	Zhuang Shuibin; China	Farzin Asadi; Iran
K-2 200 m	Kazakhstan; Oleg Yanitskiy; Sergii Tokarnytskyi	South Korea; Cho Gwang-hee; Choi Min-kyu	Japan; Momotaro Matsushita; Hiroki Fujishima
K-2 1000 m	Kazakhstan; Alexey Dergunov; Yevgeniy Alexeyev	Uzbekistan; Sergey Borzov; Vyacheslav Gorn	Iran; Ali Aghamirzaei; Amin Boudaghi
K-4 1000 m	Iran; Ali Aghamirzaei; Babak Darban; Farzin Asadi; Amin Boudaghi	Kazakhstan; Vladimir Kartushin; Alexandr Gudilov; Sergii Tokarnytskyi; Yuriy Berezintsev	Uzbekistan; Sergey Borzov; Vyacheslav Gorn; Marlen Seityagyaev; Aleksandr Tropin

=== Women ===
Event	Gold	Silver	Bronze
C-1 200 m	Fatemeh Karamjani; Iran	Yulia Tsoy; Uzbekistan	Ko Haeng-bok; North Korea
C-1 500 m	Trương Thị Phương; Vietnam	Fatemeh Karamjani; Iran	Lim Yuan Yin; Singapore
K-1 200 m	Olga Umaralieva; Uzbekistan	Li Yue; China	Stephenie Chen; Singapore
K-1 500 m	Zhou Yu; China	Zoya Ananchenko; Kazakhstan	Yuliya Borzova; Uzbekistan
K-2 200 m	Kazakhstan; Sofya Yemelyanova; Irina Podoinikova	China; Huang Jieyi; Wu Yanan	Chinese Taipei; Liu Hui-chi; Chou Ju-chuan
K-2 500 m	China; Ren Wenjun; Ma Qing	Kazakhstan; Natalya Sergeyeva; Irina Podoinikova	Japan; Asumi Omura; Shiho Kakizaki
K-4 500 m	China; Ren Wenjun; Huang Jieyi; Ma Qing; Liu Haiping	Kazakhstan; Natalya Sergeyeva; Irina Podoinikova; Zoya Ananchenko; Yekaterina Podstavochkina	South Korea; Choi Min-ji; Lee Sun-ja; Lee Hye-ran; Kim You-jin

== Medal table ==
Rank	Nation	Gold	Silver	Bronze	Total
1	Kazakhstan	5	4	1	10
2	Uzbekistan	5	3	2	10
3	China	3	5	0	8
4	Iran	2	1	4	7
5	Vietnam	1	0	0	1
6	South Korea	0	2	2	4
7	Indonesia	0	1	0	1
8	Singapore	0	0	3	3
9	Japan	0	0	2	2
10	Chinese Taipei	0	0	1	1
10	North Korea	0	0	1	1
Totals (11 entries)		16	16	16	48
