= Zoya Ananchenko =

Kazakhstani canoeist (born 1996)

Medal record

Women's canoe sprint

Representing Kazakhstan

Asian Championships
Silver medal – second place	2015 Palembang	K-1 500 m
Silver medal – second place	2015 Palembang	K-4 500 m
Silver medal – second place	2017 Shanghai	K-4 200 m
Silver medal – second place	2017 Shanghai	K-4 500 m
Silver medal – second place	2017 Shanghai	K-4 1000 m

Zoya Sergeyevna Ananchenko (born September 5, 1996) is a Kazakhstani sprint canoeist.

Ananchenko competed at the 2016 Summer Olympics in the women's K-1 500 metres race, in which she reached the semifinals, and as part of the tenth-place Kazakhstan team in the women's K-4 500 metres race.
