= 2009 Asian Canoe Sprint Championships =

Canoeing competition in Tehran, Iran

- Host city: Tehran, Iran
- Dates: 26–29 September 2009
- Main venue: Azadi Lake

The 2009 Asian Canoe Sprint Championships was the 13th Asian Canoe Sprint Championships and took place from September 26–29, 2009 in Azadi Lake, Tehran, Iran.

== Medal summary ==
=== Men ===
Event	Gold	Silver	Bronze
C-1 200 m	Mikhail Yemelyanov; Kazakhstan	Anwar Tarra; Indonesia	Shahoo Nasseri; Iran
C-1 500 m	Mikhail Yemelyanov; Kazakhstan	Shahoo Nasseri; Iran	Shin Dong-jin; South Korea
C-1 1000 m	Shahoo Nasseri; Iran	Zhu Chaoxun; China	Kim Tae-eun; South Korea
C-1 5000 m	Shahoo Nasseri; Iran	Hoàng Hồng Anh; Vietnam	Asnawir; Indonesia
C-2 200 m	Kazakhstan; Vyacheslav Stepanov; Zhomart Satubaldin	Indonesia; Eka Octarorianus; Anwar Tarra	Vietnam; Lưu Văn Hoàn; Trần Văn Long
C-2 500 m	Kazakhstan; Vyacheslav Stepanov; Zhomart Satubaldin	South Korea; Kim Tae-eun; Shin Dong-jin	Vietnam; Lưu Văn Hoàn; Trần Văn Long
C-2 1000 m	South Korea; Kim Tae-eun; Shin Dong-jin	Vietnam; Lưu Văn Hoàn; Trần Văn Long	China; Xu Shuai; Zhu Chaoxun
C-2 5000 m	Indonesia; Eka Octarorianus; Anwar Tarra	India; Amarjeet Singh; Gurdeep Singh	China; Xu Shuai; Zhu Chaoxun
K-1 200 m	Dmitriy Torlopov; Kazakhstan	Aleksey Mochalov; Uzbekistan	Nguyễn Thành Quang; Vietnam
K-1 500 m	Alexey Dergunov; Kazakhstan	Yasuhiro Suzuki; Japan	Ahmad Reza Talebian; Iran
K-1 1000 m	Ahmad Reza Talebian; Iran	Yasuhiro Suzuki; Japan	Dmitriy Torlopov; Kazakhstan
K-1 5000 m	Ahmad Reza Talebian; Iran	Yevgeniy Alexeyev; Kazakhstan	Vyacheslav Gorn; Uzbekistan
K-2 200 m	Uzbekistan; Aleksey Babadjanov; Sergey Borzov	Kazakhstan; Yevgeniy Yegorov; Alexey Dergunov	Iran; Abbas Sayyadi; Amin Boudaghi
K-2 500 m	Kazakhstan; Alexandr Yemelyanov; Alexey Dergunov	Uzbekistan; Aleksey Babadjanov; Sergey Borzov	Kyrgyzstan; Aleksandr Parol; Igor Dorofeev
K-2 1000 m	Kazakhstan; Alexandr Yemelyanov; Alexey Dergunov	Iran; Yaser Hedayati; Ahmad Reza Talebian	South Korea; Lee Hyun-woo; Seo Tae-won
K-2 5000 m	Uzbekistan; Aleksey Babadjanov; Sergey Borzov	Kazakhstan; Alexandr Yemelyanov; Alexey Dergunov	Kyrgyzstan; Aleksey Nikolaev; Ilia Algin
K-4 200 m	Uzbekistan; Aleksey Babadjanov; Sergey Borzov; Aleksey Mochalov; Vyacheslav Gorn	Iran; Yaser Hedayati; Abbas Sayyadi; Amin Boudaghi; Ahmad Reza Talebian	Kazakhstan; Yuriy Berezintsev; Artyom Loboda; Alexey Podoinikov; Danila Turchin
K-4 500 m	Uzbekistan; Aleksey Mochalov; Vladimir Osokin; Aleksey Pityakov; Vyacheslav Gorn	Kazakhstan; Yevgeniy Yegorov; Dmitriy Torlopov; Yevgeniy Alexeyev; Yegor Sergeyev	Iran; Yaser Hedayati; Abbas Sayyadi; Amin Boudaghi; Ahmad Reza Talebian
K-4 1000 m	Kazakhstan; Yevgeniy Yegorov; Dmitriy Torlopov; Yevgeniy Alexeyev; Alexandr Yemelyanov	Iran; Hossein Sinkaei; Armin Bakhshizad; Abbas Sayyadi; Amin Boudaghi	Uzbekistan; Aleksey Babadjanov; Sergey Borzov; Aleksey Mochalov; Aleksey Pityakov

=== Women ===
Event	Gold	Silver	Bronze
K-1 200 m	Natalya Sergeyeva; Kazakhstan	Yuliya Borzova; Uzbekistan	Yoo Mi-na; South Korea
K-1 500 m	Natalya Sergeyeva; Kazakhstan	Yuliya Borzova; Uzbekistan	Ayaka Kuno; Japan
K-1 1000 m	Natalya Sergeyeva; Kazakhstan	Arezoo Motamedi; Iran	Lee Sun-ja; South Korea
K-1 5000 m	Yuliya Borzova; Uzbekistan	Lee Sun-ja; South Korea	Dorsa Kafili; Iran
K-2 200 m	South Korea; Yoo Mi-na; Kim Guk-joo	Kazakhstan; Olga Shmelyova; Irina Podoinikova	Uzbekistan; Maria Mekheda; Ekaterina Shubina
K-2 500 m	Kazakhstan; Olga Shmelyova; Yelena Podoinikova	Japan; Asumi Omura; Ayaka Kuno	South Korea; Yoo Mi-na; Kim Guk-joo
K-2 1000 m	Kazakhstan; Olga Shmelyova; Yelena Podoinikova	Uzbekistan; Viktoria Petrishina; Ekaterina Shubina	Japan; Asumi Omura; Ayaka Kuno
K-2 5000 m	Uzbekistan; Maria Mekheda; Viktoria Petrishina	Iran; Sima Orouji; Arezoo Motamedi	Kazakhstan; Irina Podoinikova; Yelena Podoinikova
K-4 200 m	Uzbekistan; Yuliya Borzova; Maria Mekheda; Viktoria Petrishina; Ekaterina Shubina	Kazakhstan; Olga Shmelyova; Natalya Sergeyeva; Inna Popova; Yelena Podoinikova	South Korea; Yoo Mi-na; Shin Jin-ah; Lee Sun-ja; Kim Guk-joo
K-4 500 m	Uzbekistan; Yuliya Borzova; Maria Mekheda; Viktoria Petrishina; Ekaterina Shubina	Kazakhstan; Olga Shmelyova; Irina Podoinikova; Yelena Podoinikova; Alla Ispanbekova	South Korea; Yoo Mi-na; Shin Jin-ah; Lee Sun-ja; Kim Guk-joo
K-4 1000 m	South Korea; Yoo Mi-na; Shin Jin-ah; Lee Sun-ja; Kim Guk-joo	Kazakhstan; Olga Shmelyova; Irina Podoinikova; Yelena Podoinikova; Alla Ispanbekova	Uzbekistan; Yuliya Borzova; Maria Mekheda; Ksenia Polunina; Olga Umaralieva

== Medal table ==
Rank	Nation	Gold	Silver	Bronze	Total
1	Kazakhstan	14	8	3	25
2	Uzbekistan	8	5	4	17
3	Iran	4	6	5	15
4	South Korea	3	2	8	13
5	Indonesia	1	2	1	4
6	Japan	0	3	2	5
7	Vietnam	0	2	3	5
8	China	0	1	2	3
9	India	0	1	0	1
10	Kyrgyzstan	0	0	2	2
Totals (10 entries)		30	30	30	90
