= 2024 Asian Canoe Sprint Championships =

Canoeing competition in Tokyo, Japan

- Host city: Tokyo, Japan
- Dates: 18–21 April 2024
- Main venue: Sea Forest Waterway

The 2024 Asian Canoe Sprint Championships were the 19th Asian Canoe Sprint Championships and took place from 18 to 21 April 2024 in Sea Forest Waterway, Tokyo, Japan.

The event is also the continental qualification for the 2024 Summer Olympics in Paris.

== Medal summary ==
=== Men ===
Event	Gold	Silver	Bronze
C-1 200 m	Viktor Stepanov; Kazakhstan	Pitpiboon Mahawattanangkul; Thailand	Elyorjon Mamadaliev; Uzbekistan
C-1 1000 m	Mohammad Nabi Rezaei; Iran	Lai Kuan-chieh; Chinese Taipei	Miao Feilong; China
C-2 500 m	Kazakhstan; Sergey Yemelyanov; Timur Khaidarov	Japan; Masato Hashimoto; Ryo Naganuma	Uzbekistan; Artur Guliev; Vladlen Denisov
K-1 200 m	Cho Gwang-hee; South Korea	Denis Onufriev; Uzbekistan	Ali Aghamirzaei; Iran
K-1 1000 m	Shakhriyor Makhkamov; Uzbekistan	Andrey Yerguchyov; Kazakhstan	Ali Aghamirzaei; Iran
K-2 500 m	Kazakhstan; Bekarys Ramatulla; Sergii Tokarnytskyi	South Korea; Cho Gwang-hee; Jang Sang-won	China; Shang Yongkang; Chen Weiyang

=== Women ===
Event	Gold	Silver	Bronze
C-1 200 m	Nilufar Zokirova; Uzbekistan	Nguyễn Thị Hương; Vietnam	Mariya Brovkova; Kazakhstan
C-1 500 m	Diệp Thị Hương; Vietnam	Ulyana Kisseleva; Kazakhstan	Megha Pradeep; India
C-2 500 m	Kazakhstan; Mariya Brovkova; Rufina Iskakova	Vietnam; Nguyễn Thị Hương; Nguyễn Hồng Thái	Indonesia; Nurmeni; Sella Monim
K-1 200 m	Tatyana Tokarnitskaya; Kazakhstan	Shakhrizoda Mavlonova; Uzbekistan	Choi Ran; South Korea
K-1 500 m	Zhang Luxi; China	Ekaterina Shubina; Uzbekistan	Stephenie Chen; Singapore
K-2 500 m	China; Yu Shimeng; Chen Yule	Uzbekistan; Ekaterina Shubina; Arina Tanatmisheva	Kazakhstan; Olga Shmelyova; Irina Podoinikova

=== Mixed ===
Event	Gold	Silver	Bronze
C-2 500 m	Kazakhstan; Sergey Yemelyanov; Rufina Iskakova	Uzbekistan; Vladlen Denisov; Khamzoda Erkinova	Thailand; Pitpiboon Mahawattanangkul; Aphinya Sroichit
K-2 500 m	Uzbekistan; Ozodjon Amriddinov; Shakhrizoda Mavlonova	Kazakhstan; Artyom Terechshenko; Olga Shmelyova	South Korea; Jeong Ju-hwan; Lee Ha-lin

== Medal table ==
Rank	Nation	Gold	Silver	Bronze	Total
1	Kazakhstan	6	3	2	11
2	Uzbekistan	3	5	2	10
3	China	2	0	2	4
4	Vietnam	1	2	0	3
5	South Korea	1	1	2	4
6	Iran	1	0	2	3
7	Thailand	0	1	1	2
8	Chinese Taipei	0	1	0	1
8	Japan	0	1	0	1
10	India	0	0	1	1
10	Indonesia	0	0	1	1
10	Singapore	0	0	1	1
Totals (12 entries)		14	14	14	42
