= Mikhail Yemelyanov =

Kazakhstani canoeist

Medal record

Men's canoe sprint

Representing Kazakhstan

Asian Games
Bronze medal – third place	2010 Guangzhou	C-2 1000 m

Asian Championships
Gold medal – first place	2009 Tehran	C-1 200 m
Gold medal – first place	2009 Tehran	C-1 500 m
Gold medal – first place	2013 Samarkand	C-2 200 m
Gold medal – first place	2017 Shanghai	C-4 200 m
Gold medal – first place	2017 Shanghai	C-4 500 m
Gold medal – first place	2017 Shanghai	C-4 1000 m
Silver medal – second place	2013 Samarkand	C-2 500 m

Mikhail Yemelyanov (born 5 April 1991) is a Kazakhstani sprint canoer who competed in the late 2000s. At the 2008 Summer Olympics in Beijing, he was eliminated in the semifinals of both the C-1 500 m and the C-1 1000 m events.
