= Li Zhen (canoeist) =

Chinese sprint canoer (born 1985)

Personal information
- Native name: 李臻
- Nationality: Chinese
- Born: 26 February 1985 (age 41) Ma'anshan, Anhui
- Height: 1.89 m (6 ft 2 in)
- Weight: 82 kg (181 lb)

Sport
- Country: China
- Sport: male sprint canoeist
Medal record
Men's canoe sprint
Representing China
Asian Championships
Gold medal – first place	2007 Hwacheon	K-4 200 m
Gold medal – first place	2007 Hwacheon	K-4 500 m
Gold medal – first place	2007 Hwacheon	K-4 1000 m
Silver medal – second place	2005 Putrajaya	K-2 500 m
Silver medal – second place	2005 Putrajaya	K-4 200 m
Bronze medal – third place	2005 Putrajaya	K-4 1000 m

Li Zhen (Chinese: 李臻; born 26 February 1985 in Ma'anshan, Anhui) is a Chinese sprint canoer who competed in the late 2000s. He finished seventh in the K-4 1000 m event at the 2008 Summer Olympics in Beijing.
