= Gerasim Kochnev =

Uzbek canoeist (born 1987)

Personal information
- Born: 20 March 1987 (age 39) Chirchiq, Tashkent Region, Uzbek SSR, Soviet Union

Sport
- Sport: Canoe sprint
Medal record
Men's canoe sprint
Representing Uzbekistan
Asian Championships
Gold medal – first place	2005 Putrajaya	C-4 1000 m
Gold medal – first place	2013 Samarkand	C-2 500 m
Gold medal – first place	2013 Samarkand	C-2 1000 m
Gold medal – first place	2015 Palembang	C-1 1000 m
Silver medal – second place	2005 Putrajaya	C-4 500 m
Silver medal – second place	2007 Hwacheon	C-2 1000 m
Silver medal – second place	2011 Tehran	C-1 1000 m
Silver medal – second place	2011 Tehran	C-4 1000 m
Silver medal – second place	2017 Shanghai	C-4 500 m
Bronze medal – third place	2007 Hwacheon	C-2 200 m
Bronze medal – third place	2007 Hwacheon	C-2 500 m
Bronze medal – third place	2011 Tehran	C-1 500 m
Bronze medal – third place	2013 Samarkand	C-2 200 m
Bronze medal – third place	2017 Shanghai	C-4 1000 m
Bronze medal – third place	2022 Rayong	C-2 1000 m
Bronze medal – third place	2022 Rayong	C-4 200 m

Gerasim Kochnev (born 20 March 1987) is an Uzbekistani canoeist. He competed in the men's C-1 1000 metres event at the 2016 Summer Olympics.
