= Wang Lei (canoeist) =

Chinese canoeist

Wang Lei (born January 25, 1981) is a Chinese sprint canoer who competed in the mid-2000s. At the 2004 Summer Olympics in Athens, he was eliminated in the semifinals of the K-2 500 m event while being disqualified in the semifinals of the K-2 1000 m event.
