= Serik Mirbekov =

Uzbekistani canoeist (born 1988)

Personal information
- Nationality: Uzbekistani
- Born: 9 June 1988 (age 38)

Sport
- Sport: Canoeing
Medal record
Men's canoe sprint
Representing Uzbekistan
Asian Championships
| Gold medal – first place | 2013 Samarkand | C-2 500 m |
| Gold medal – first place | 2013 Samarkand | C-2 1000 m |
| Gold medal – first place | 2015 Palembang | C-2 1000 m |
| Silver medal – second place | 2007 Hwacheon | C-2 1000 m |
| Silver medal – second place | 2011 Tehran | C-4 1000 m |
| Silver medal – second place | 2017 Shanghai | C-4 200 m |
| Bronze medal – third place | 2007 Hwacheon | C-2 200 m |
| Bronze medal – third place | 2007 Hwacheon | C-2 500 m |
| Bronze medal – third place | 2013 Samarkand | C-2 200 m |
| Bronze medal – third place | 2017 Shanghai | C-4 1000 m |

Serik Mirbekov (born 9 June 1988) is an Uzbekistani sprint canoer.

He competed at the 2016 Summer Olympics in Rio de Janeiro, in the men's C-2 1000 metres.
