= Lee Sun-ja =

South Korean canoeist

Medal record

Women's canoe sprint

Representing South Korea

Asian Championships
Gold medal – first place	2009 Tehran	K-4 1000 m
Silver medal – second place	2005 Putrajaya	K-2 1000 m
Silver medal – second place	2005 Putrajaya	K-4 1000 m
Silver medal – second place	2007 Hwacheon	K-2 1000 m
Silver medal – second place	2009 Tehran	K-1 5000 m
Bronze medal – third place	2005 Putrajaya	K-1 500 m
Bronze medal – third place	2005 Putrajaya	K-4 500 m
Bronze medal – third place	2007 Hwacheon	K-1 500 m
Bronze medal – third place	2009 Tehran	K-1 1000 m
Bronze medal – third place	2009 Tehran	K-4 200 m
Bronze medal – third place	2009 Tehran	K-4 500 m
Bronze medal – third place	2015 Palembang	K-4 500 m

Lee Sun-Ja (born May 23, 1978) is a South Korean sprint canoer who competed in the late 2000s. At the 2008 Summer Olympics in Beijing, she was eliminated in the heats of the K-1 500 m event.
