= Keiji Mizumoto =

Japanese canoeist (born 1988)

Personal information
- Nationality: Japanese
- Born: 7 April 1988 (age 38)

Sport
- Sport: Canoe sprint
Medal record
Men's sprint canoe
Representing Japan
Asian Championships
Silver medal – second place	2011 Tehran	K-1 200 m
Silver medal – second place	2017 Shanghai	K-4 500 m

Keiji Mizumoto (水本 圭治, Mizumoto Keiji, born 7 April 1988) is a Japanese canoeist. He competed in the men's K-4 500 metres event at the 2020 Summer Olympics.
