= Ahmad Reza Talebian =

Iranian canoeist

Personal information
- Born: 19 May 1989 (age 37) Isfahan

Sport
- Country: Iran
- Sport: Canoe sprint
Medal record
Men's canoe sprint
Representing Iran
Asian Games
Gold medal – first place	2010 Guangzhou	K1 1000 m
Silver medal – second place	2014 Incheon	K1 1000 m
Bronze medal – third place	2010 Guangzhou	K4 1000 m
Bronze medal – third place	2018 Jakarta–Palembang	K4 500 m
Asian Championships
Gold medal – first place	2009 Tehran	K1 1000 m
Gold medal – first place	2009 Tehran	K1 5000 m
Gold medal – first place	2011 Tehran	K1 500 m
Gold medal – first place	2011 Tehran	K1 1000 m
Gold medal – first place	2011 Tehran	K1 5000 m
Gold medal – first place	2013 Samarkand	K1 5000 m
Gold medal – first place	2013 Samarkand	K4 1000 m
Silver medal – second place	2009 Tehran	K2 1000 m
Silver medal – second place	2009 Tehran	K4 200 m
Silver medal – second place	2013 Samarkand	K1 1000 m
Silver medal – second place	2017 Shanghai	K2 1000 m
Bronze medal – third place	2009 Tehran	K1 500 m
Bronze medal – third place	2009 Tehran	K4 500 m

Ahmad Reza Talebian (Persian: احمدرضا طالبیان; born 19 May 1989 in Isfahan) is an Iranian canoeist. He competed in the men's K-1 1000 metres event at the 2012 Summer Olympics.

He won a gold medal at the Canoeing at the 2010 Asian Games He won a bronze medal at the Canoeing at the 2018 Asian Games and gold medal in the 2013 Asian Canoe Sprint Championships and Participate in the London Olympics Canoeing at the 2012 Summer Olympics – Men's K-1 1000 metres.
