= Momotaro Matsushita =

Japanese canoeist (born 1988)

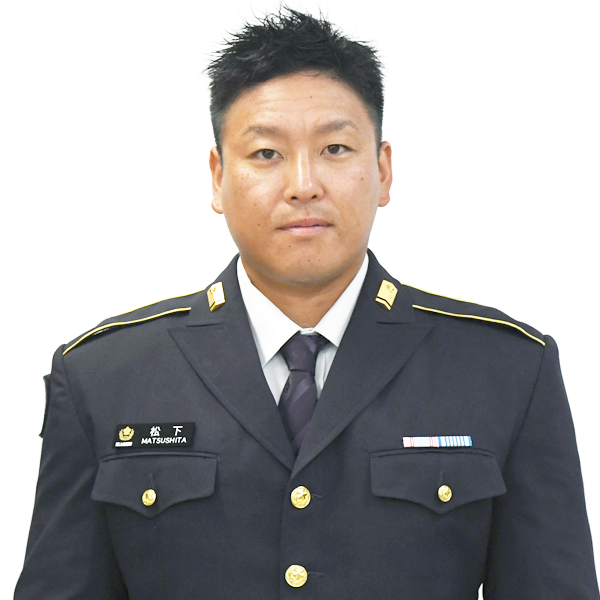
- Matsushita (2021)

Personal information
- Born: 3 March 1988 (age 38) Komatsu, Ishikawa, Japan
- Height: 168 cm (5 ft 6 in)
- Weight: 75 kg (165 lb)
Medal record
Men's canoe sprint
Representing Japan
Asian Games
Gold medal – first place	2010 Guangzhou	K-1 200 m
Gold medal – first place	2010 Guangzhou	K-2 200 m
Gold medal – first place	2014 Incheon	K-2 200 m
Asian Championships
Gold medal – first place	2011 Tehran	K-2 200 m
Silver medal – second place	2005 Putrajaya	K-2 200 m
Silver medal – second place	2017 Shanghai	K-2 200 m
Silver medal – second place	2017 Shanghai	K-4 500 m
Bronze medal – third place	2007 Hwacheon	K-2 200 m
Bronze medal – third place	2015 Palembang	K-2 200 m

Momotaro Matsushita (松下 桃太郎, Matsushita Momotarō; born 3 March 1988 in Komatsu, Ishikawa) is a Japanese sprint canoeist. At the 2012 Summer Olympics, he competed in the Men's K-1 200 metres and the men's K-2 200 m with Hiroki Watanabe.
