= Aleksey Babadjanov =

Uzbekistani sprint canoer (born 1978)

Medal record

Men's canoe sprint

Representing Uzbekistan

Asian Games
Gold medal – first place	2010 Guangzhou	K4 1000 m
Silver medal – second place	2010 Guangzhou	K2 200 m
Silver medal – second place	2006 Doha	K1 1000 m
Silver medal – second place	2006 Doha	K2 500 m
Bronze medal – third place	2002 Busan	K4 500 m

Asian Championships
Gold medal – first place	2005 Putrajaya	K-4 500 m
Gold medal – first place	2005 Putrajaya	K-4 1000 m
Gold medal – first place	2009 Tehran	K-2 200 m
Gold medal – first place	2009 Tehran	K-2 5000 m
Gold medal – first place	2009 Tehran	K-4 200 m
Silver medal – second place	2005 Putrajaya	K-1 200 m
Silver medal – second place	2005 Putrajaya	K-1 500 m
Silver medal – second place	2009 Tehran	K-2 500 m
Bronze medal – third place	2009 Tehran	K-4 1000 m

Aleksey Babadjanov (sometimes listed as Aleksey Babdazhanov, born September 25, 1978) is an Uzbekistani sprint canoer who competed in the mid-2000s. At the 2004 Summer Olympics in Athens, he was eliminated in the semifinals of both the K-2 500 m and the K-4 1000 m events.
