= Aleksey Mochalov =

Uzbek canoeist (born 1990)

Personal information
- Born: 13 February 1990 (age 36)

Sport
- Sport: Canoe sprint
Medal record
Men's canoe sprint
Representing Uzbekistan
Asian Championships
Gold medal – first place	2009 Tehran	K-4 200 m
Gold medal – first place	2009 Tehran	K-4 500 m
Gold medal – first place	2013 Samarkand	K-1 500 m
Gold medal – first place	2013 Samarkand	K-1 1000 m
Gold medal – first place	2015 Palembang	K-1 1000 m
Gold medal – first place	2017 Shanghai	K-1 1000 m
Silver medal – second place	2009 Tehran	K-1 200 m
Silver medal – second place	2011 Tehran	K-2 1000 m
Silver medal – second place	2013 Samarkand	K-4 1000 m
Bronze medal – third place	2009 Tehran	K-4 1000 m
Bronze medal – third place	2011 Tehran	K-1 200 m
Bronze medal – third place	2011 Tehran	K-2 200 m

Aleksey Mochalov (born 13 February 1990) is an Uzbekistani canoeist. He competed in the men's K-1 1000 metres event at the 2016 Summer Olympics.
