= Alexandr Yemelyanov =

Kazakhstani canoeist (born 1984)

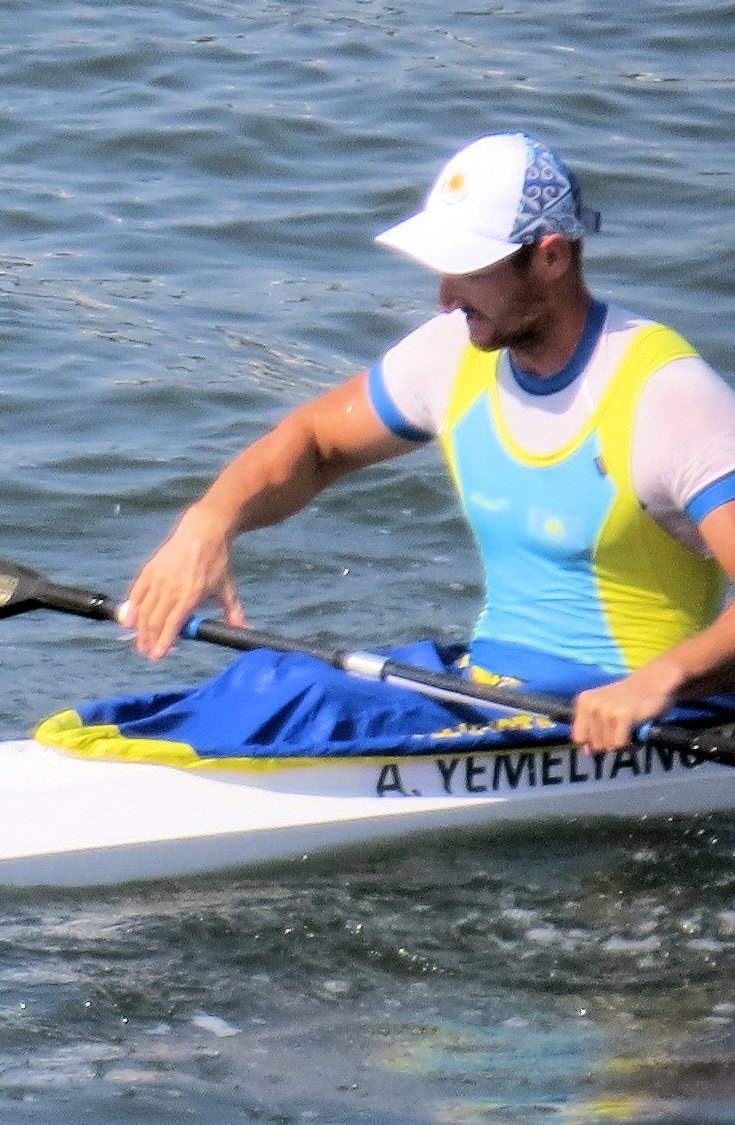
- Yemelyanov at the 2016 Summer Olympics

Personal information
- Born: January 1, 1984 (age 42)
Medal record
Men's sprint canoe
Representing Kazakhstan
Asian Championships
Gold medal – first place	2005 Putrajaya	K-1 500 m
Gold medal – first place	2005 Putrajaya	K-1 1000 m
Gold medal – first place	2009 Tehran	K-2 500 m
Gold medal – first place	2009 Tehran	K-2 1000 m
Gold medal – first place	2009 Tehran	K-4 1000 m
Gold medal – first place	2022 Rayong	K-2 1000 m
Silver medal – second place	2009 Tehran	K-2 5000 m
Silver medal – second place	2013 Samarkand	K-1 500 m
Bronze medal – third place	2013 Samarkand	K-1 1000 m
Bronze medal – third place	2022 Rayong	K-4 1000 m

Alexandr Yemelyanov (born January 1, 1984) is a Kazakhstani sprint canoeist. He competed at the 2016 Summer Olympics in the Canoeing at the 2016 Summer Olympics – Men's K-4 1000 metres race as part of the tenth-place Kazakhstan team.
