= Sergey Borzov =

Uzbekistani sprint canoer (born 1981)

Personal information
- Born: January 14, 1981 (age 45)
Medal record
Men's canoe sprint
Representing Uzbekistan
Asian Games
Gold medal – first place	2010 Guangzhou	K-4 1000 m
Silver medal – second place	2006 Doha	K-1 500 m
Silver medal – second place	2006 Doha	K-2 500 m
Silver medal – second place	2010 Guangzhou	K-2 200 m
Bronze medal – third place	2002 Busan	K-4 500 m
Asian Championships
Gold medal – first place	2005 Putrajaya	K-4 500 m
Gold medal – first place	2005 Putrajaya	K-4 1000 m
Gold medal – first place	2009 Tehran	K-2 200 m
Gold medal – first place	2009 Tehran	K-2 5000 m
Gold medal – first place	2009 Tehran	K-4 200 m
Silver medal – second place	2007 Hwacheon	K-1 500 m
Silver medal – second place	2007 Hwacheon	K-4 1000 m
Silver medal – second place	2009 Tehran	K-2 500 m
Silver medal – second place	2011 Tehran	K-2 1000 m
Silver medal – second place	2013 Samarkand	K-1 5000 m
Silver medal – second place	2013 Samarkand	K-4 1000 m
Silver medal – second place	2015 Palembang	K-2 1000 m
Bronze medal – third place	2005 Putrajaya	K-2 200 m
Bronze medal – third place	2007 Hwacheon	K-1 1000 m
Bronze medal – third place	2007 Hwacheon	K-4 200 m
Bronze medal – third place	2007 Hwacheon	K-4 500 m
Bronze medal – third place	2009 Tehran	K-4 1000 m
Bronze medal – third place	2011 Tehran	K-2 200 m
Bronze medal – third place	2015 Palembang	K-4 1000 m

Sergey Borzov (born January 14, 1981) is an Uzbekistani sprint canoer who competed in the mid-2000s. At the 2004 Summer Olympics in Athens, he was eliminated in the semifinals of both the K-2 500 m and the K-4 1000 m events.
