= Misari Regatta =

Rowing venue near Seoul, South Korea

Coordinates: 37°33′40″N 127°12′20″E

- Hangul: 미사경정공원
- Hanja: 渼沙里 漕艇競技場
- Revised Romanization: Misa jojeong gyeonggijang
- McCune–Reischauer: Misa chojŏng kyŏnggijang

Misa Regatta is a boat racing track and park located in the neighborhood of Misa-dong in Hanam, Gyeonggi Province, South Korea. It is 20 km east of Seoul. It was established for the rowing and canoeing competition during the 1986 Asian Games and the 1988 Olympics. The place has a 4.4 square kilometers in total, the lake area of which covers 2,212 m in length, 140m in width and depth 3m. The area was originally a small island surrounded by sand which made its scenery as beautiful as if it were waving, so was named "Misa-ri" (sand waving) in Korean.
