= Asian Canoeing Championships =

Canoeing championship organised by the Asian Canoe Confederation

The Asian Canoeing Championship is a Canoeing championship organised by the Asian Canoe Confederation for competitors from Asian countries.

== List tournaments ==
=== Canoe Sprint ===
#	Year	Venue	Date
1	1985	Kobe, Japan	
2	1987	Zhaoqing, China	10–12 October 1987
3	1989	Jakarta, Indonesia	4–7 November 1989
4	1991	Otsu, Japan	8–11 November 1991
5	1993	Hiroshima, Japan	7–10 October 1993
6	1995	Chengdu, China	8–10 October 1995
7	1997	Sokcho, South Korea	5–7 September 1997
8	1999	Changde, China	15–22 September 1999
9	2001	Tehran, Iran	17–20 May 2001
10	2003	Bhopal, India	1–4 October 2003
11	2005	Putrajaya, Malaysia	17–20 December 2005
12	2007	Hwacheon, South Korea	13–16 September 2007
13	2009	Tehran, Iran	26–29 September 2009
14	2011	Tehran, Iran	13–16 October 2011
15	2013	Samarkand, Uzbekistan	26–29 September 2013
16	2015	Palembang, Indonesia	4–8 November 2015
17	2017	Shanghai, China	15–18 October 2017
18	2022	Rayong, Thailand	24–26 March 2022
19	2024	Tokyo, Japan	18–21 April 2024
20	2025	Nanchang, China	8–10 May 2025
21	2026	Hefei, China	24–26 April 2026

=== Canoe Slalom ===
#	Year	Venue	Date
1	2000	Changzhou, China	4–7 November 2000
2	2002	Karaj, Iran	20–21 May 2002
3	2003	Shuili, Taiwan	14–16 November 2003
4	2005	Inje, South Korea	1–2 July 2005
5	2008	Nakhon Nayok, Thailand	17–18 May 2008
6	2010	Xiasi, China	1–3 May 2010
7	2011	Miyi, China	16–18 December 2011
8	2013	Shuili, Taiwan	23–26 May 2013
9	2016	Toyama, Japan	23–24 April 2016
10	2017	Nakhon Nayok, Thailand	24–26 February 2017
11	2022	Rayong, Thailand	20–22 March 2022
12	2023	Tokyo, Japan	27–29 October 2023
13	2024	Rayong, Thailand	5–9 March 2024
14	2025	Xiasi, China	14–17 August 2025
15	2026	Xiasi, China	13–16 May 2026

=== Canoe Polo ===
#	Year	Venue	Men			Women		
#	Year	Venue	1st	2nd	3rd	1st	2nd	3rd
1	1985	Tokyo, Japan	HKG	JPN	MAS	—		
2	1987	Zhaoqing, China	HKG A	HKG B	JPN	—		
3	1989	Jakarta, Indonesia	HKG A	HKG B	JPN	—		
4	1991	Ōtsu, Japan	HKG	JPN	INA	—		
5	1993	Hiroshima, Japan	INA	TPE	JPN	—		
6	1995	Chengdu, China	HKG	JPN	INA	—		
7	1997	Sokcho, South Korea	INA	HKG	JPN	—		
8	1999	Changde, China	TPE	HKG	IRI	JPN	TPE	HKG
9	2002	Tehran, Iran	JPN	IRI	TPE	JPN	IRI	TPE
10	2003	Tainan, Taiwan	TPE	JPN	IRI	JPN	TPE	HKG
11	2005	Putrajaya, Malaysia	TPE	JPN	IRI	IRI	SGP	JPN
12	2007	Hwacheon, South Korea	TPE	JPN	IRI	IRI	JPN	TPE
13	2009	Hualien, Taiwan	TPE	JPN	IRI	IRI	SGP	TPE
14	2011	Tehran, Iran	IRI	JPN	TPE	IRI	TPE	JPN
15	2013	New Delhi, India	TPE	JPN	IRI	IRI	SGP	JPN
16	2015	Hong Kong	JPN	TPE	IRI	SGP	IRI	TPE
17	2017	Sungai Mati, Malaysia	IRI	JPN	TPE	TPE	IRI	SGP
18	2023	Singapore	IRI; TPE	—	JPN	TPE	SGP	IRI
19	2025	Putrajaya, Malaysia	TPE	JPN	MAS	TPE	SGP	JPN
