= Switzerland at the 1996 Summer Olympics =

- IOC code: SUI
- NOC: Swiss Olympic Association
- Website: www.swissolympic.ch (in German and French)

in Atlanta
- Competitors: 114 (71 men and 43 women) in 17 sports
- Flag bearer: Stefan Schärer
- Medals Ranked 18th: Gold 4 Silver 3 Bronze 0 Total 7

Summer Olympics appearances (overview)
- 1896; 1900; 1904; 1908; 1912; 1920; 1924; 1928; 1932; 1936; 1948; 1952; 1956; 1960; 1964; 1968; 1972; 1976; 1980; 1984; 1988; 1992; 1996; 2000; 2004; 2008; 2012; 2016; 2020; 2024

Other related appearances
- 1906 Intercalated Games

Switzerland competed at the 1996 Summer Olympics in Atlanta, United States. 114 competitors, 71 men and 43 women, took part in 83 events in 17 sports.

== Medalists ==
Medal	Name	Sport	Event	Date
Gold	Pascal Richard	Cycling	Men's road race	
Gold	Li Donghua	Gymnastics	Men's pommel horse	
Gold	Xeno Müller	Rowing	Men's single sculls	
Gold	Markus Gier; Michael Gier	Rowing	Men's lightweight double sculls	
Silver	Thomas Frischknecht	Cycling	Men's mountainbike cross country	
Silver	Daniela Baumer; Sabine Eichenberger; Gabi Müller; Ingrid Haralamow	Canoeing	Women's K-4 500 metres	
Silver	Wilhelm Melliger; Calvaro V	Equestrian	Individual jumping	

== Athletics ==
Men's 1,500 metres

- Peter Philipp

- Qualification — 3:41.60 (→ did not advance)

Men's 4 × 400 m Relay

- Laurent Clerc, Kevin Widmer, Alain Rohr, and Mathias Rusterholz

- Heat — 3:03.05
- Semi Final — 3:05.36 (→ did not advance)

Men's 400m Hurdles

- Marcel Schelbert

- Heat — 51.20s (→ did not advance)

Men's Decathlon

- Philipp Huber

- Final Result — 7743 points (→ 28th place)

Men's 50 km Walk

- Pascal Charrière — 4:10:20 (→ 31st place)

Women's 400 metres

- Corinne Simasotchi

- Heat — 53.69 (→ did not advance)

Women's 10,000 metres

- Daria Nauer

- Qualification — 33:56.95 (→ did not advance)

- Ursula Jeitziner

- Qualification — did not finish (→ did not advance)

Women's 400m Hurdles

- Michele Schenk

- Qualification — 55.70
- Semifinals — 55.96 (→ did not advance)

- Martina Stoop

- Qualification — 56.32 (→ did not advance)

Women's High Jump

- Sieglinde Cadusch

- Qualification — 1.85m (→ did not advance)

Women's Heptathlon

- Patricia Nadler

- Final Result — 5803 points (→ 23rd place)

Women's Marathon

- Franziska Rochat-Moser — 2:34.48 (→ 18th place)
- Nelly Glauser — 2:37.19 (→ 34th place)

== Cycling ==
=== Road Competition ===
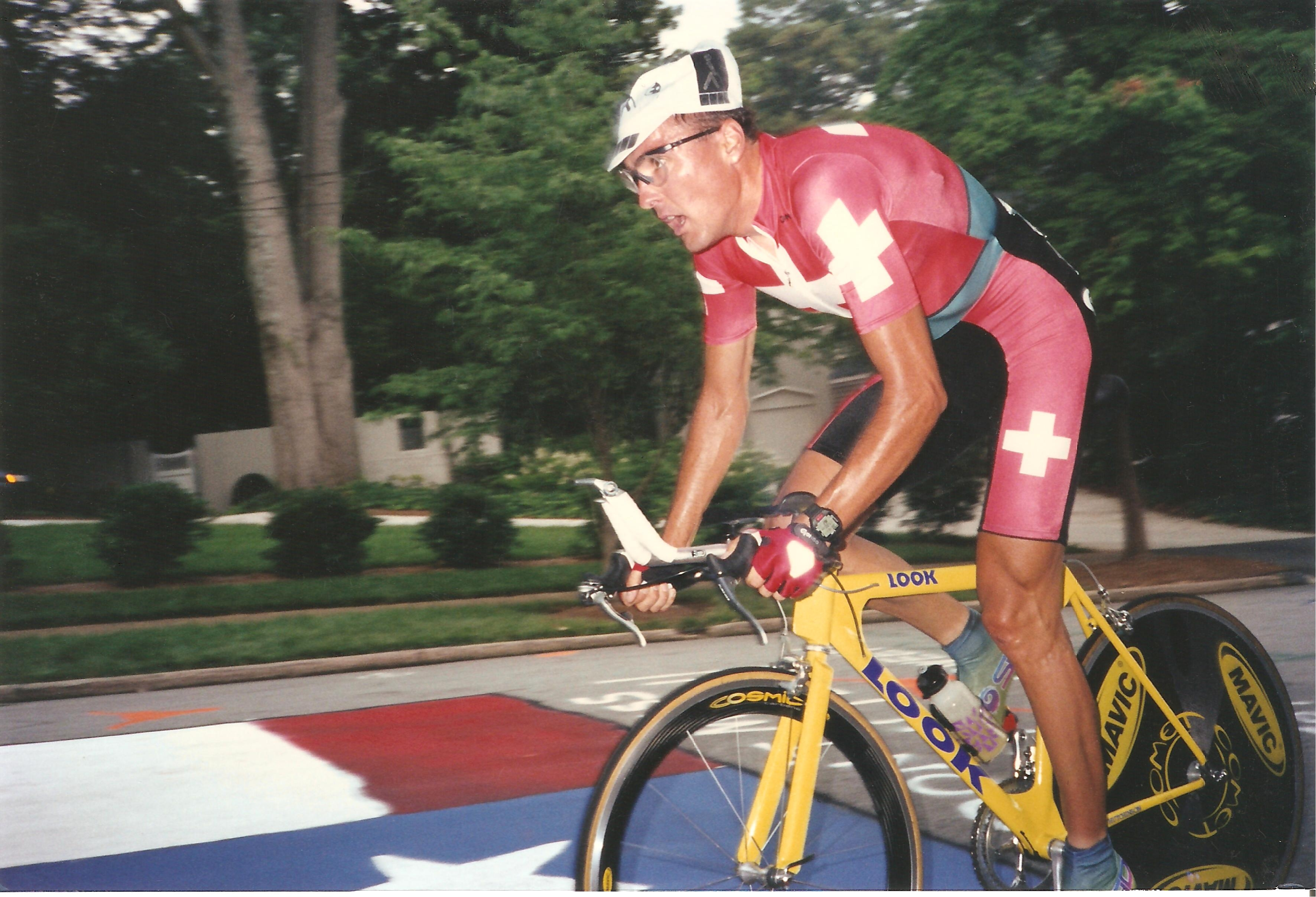
Alex Zulle during the road time trial

Men's Individual Time Trial

- Tony Rominger

- Final — 1:06:05 (→ 5th place)

- Alex Zülle

- Final — 1:06:33 (→ 7th place)

Women's Individual Road Race

- Barbara Heeb

- Final — 02:37:06 (→ 8th place)

- Yvonne Schnorf

- Final — 02:37:06 (→ 13th place)

- Diana Rast

- Final — 02:37:06 (→ 15th place)

Women's Individual Time Trial

- Diana Rast

- Final — 39:28 (→ 15th place)

=== Track Competition ===
Men's Points Race

- Bruno Risi

- Final — 8 points (→ 17th place)

=== Mountain Bike ===
Men's Cross Country

- Thomas Frischknecht

- Final — 2:20:14 (→ Silver Medal)

- Beat Wabel

- Final — 2:32:17 (→ 14th place)

Women's Cross Country

- Daniela Gassmann

- Final — 1:59.11 (→ 12th place)

- Silvia Fürst

- Final — 2:03.04 (→ 16th place)

== Fencing ==
Five fencers, two men and three women, represented Switzerland in 1996.

Men's épée

- Nic Bürgin
- Olivier Jacquet

Women's épée

- Gianna Hablützel-Bürki
- Michèle Wolf
- Sandra Kenel

Women's team épée

- Gianna Hablützel-Bürki, Michèle Wolf, Sandra Kenel

== Modern pentathlon ==
Men's Competition

- Philipp Wäffler → 29th place (4774 pts)

== Swimming ==
Women's 50m Freestyle

- Dominique Diezi
  1. Heat — 26.57 (→ did not advance, 32nd place)

Women's 100m Freestyle

- Sandrine Paquier
  1. Heat — 58.38 (→ did not advance, 36th place)

Women's 400m Freestyle

- Chantal Strasser
  1. Heat — 4:24.49 (→ did not advance, 35th place)

Women's 4 × 100 m Freestyle Relay

- Dominique Diezi, Nicole Zahnd, Lara Preacco, and Sandrine Paquier
  1. Heat — 3:53.30 (→ did not advance, 17th place)

Women's 4 × 200 m Freestyle Relay

- Sandrine Paquier, Dominique Diezi, Nicole Zahnd, and Chantal Strasser
  1. Heat — 8:21.55 (→ did not advance, 16th place)

== Tennis ==
Men's Singles Competition

- Marc Rosset
  1. First round — Defeated Hicham Arazi (Morocco) 6-2 6-3
  2. Second round — Defeated Frederik Fetterlein (Denmark) 7-6 7-5
  3. Third round — Lost to Renzo Furlan (Italy) 0-6 2-4 retired

Women's Singles Competition

- Martina Hingis
  1. First round — Defeated Joelle Schad (Dominican Republic) 6-0 6-1
  2. Second round — Lost to Ai Sugiyama (Japan) 4-6 4-6
- Patty Schnyder
  1. First round — Lost to Conchita Martínez (Spain) 1-6 2-6
