= Gladiators: Australia vs Russia =

- Starring: Kimberley Joseph and Mike Hammond
- No. of episodes: 3

Release
- Original network: Seven Network

Gladiators: Australia vs Russia was the first and only Gladiators Challenge series between Australia and Russia. The filming took place, late in 1995, at the conclusion of the third Australian series, but predominantly featured contestants from the second Australian series.

The series was a team event, in which two challengers from each country competed together, changing which contestant competes in each event. There was only one team of Russian challengers, who competed in both heats.

Joe Lukowski broke the record on Hit & Run scoring 16 points. The previous record was 14 points, which he achieved in Australian series 2.

The series was aired in Australia in 1996 and was a tie with the Australian women and the Russian men winning respectively.

== Contenders ==
Contenders
| Country | Female Contenders | Male Contenders |
|---|---|---|
| Australia | Charity Crosby (semi-finalist in series 2) & Kathy McMorrow (runner-up in series 2) | Joe Lukowski (runner-up in series 2) & Shane Saltmarsh (winner of series 2) |
| Australia | Karen Trent (semi-finalist in series 2) & Sue-Ann Woodwiss (new contestant) | Wayne Neuendorf (lost in heat 1 of series 3) & Dimitri Moskovich (new contestant) |
| Russia | Elena Eirikh and Larissa Toutchinskaya | Vladimir Vassiliev and Yuri Volkov (represented Russia at International Gladiators 2) |

== Gladiators ==
Gladiators
| Country | Female Gladiators | Male Gladiators |
|---|---|---|
| Australia | Flame, Glacier, Delta, Storm, Fury, Electra | Vulcan, Condor, Tornado, Commando, Tower, Taipan, Hammer |
| Russia | Lynx, Comet | Goliath, Dynamite, Titan, Viking |

== Shows ==
| Episode | Contest | Original airdate | Challengers (Female) | Challengers (Male) | Events |
|---|---|---|---|---|---|
| 1 | Heat 1 | | Kathy McMorrow & Charity Crosby (AUS) Vs Elena Eirikh & Larissa Toutchinskaya (RUS) | Shane Saltmarsh & Joe Lukowski (AUS) Vs Vladimir Vassiliev & Yuri Volkov (RUS) | Gauntlet, Hit & Run, Atlaspheres, Wall |
| 2 | Heat 2 | | Karen Trent & Sue-Ann Woodwiss (AUS) Vs Elena Eirikh & Larissa Toutchinskaya (RUS) | Wayne Neuendorf & Dimitri Moskovich (AUS) Vs Vladimir Vassiliev & Yuri Volkov (RUS) | Whiplash, Duel, Pursuit, Swingshot |
| 3 | Final | | Kathy McMorrow & Charity Crosby (AUS) Vs Elena Eirikh & Larissa Toutchinskaya (RUS) | Shane Saltmarsh & Joe Lukowski (AUS) Vs Vladimir Vassiliev & Yuri Volkov (RUS) | Pyramid, Hang Tough, Suspension Bridge, Powerball |

=== Heat One ===
Challengers:

- Charity Crosby & Kathy McMorrow (Australia) Vs Elena Eirikh and Larissa Toutchinskaya (Russia).
- Joe Lukowski & Shane Saltmarsh (Australia) Vs Vladimir Vassiliev and Yuri Volkov (Russia)

Female
| Event | Australia | Russia | Gladiators |
|---|---|---|---|
| Gauntlet | 5 (Kathy) | 10 (Larissa) | Fury, Storm, Delta, Lynx, Flame |
| Hit & Run | 12 (Charity) | 6 (Elena) | Lynx, Electra, Glacier, Storm |
| Atlaspheres | 4 (Charity) | 4 (Larissa) | Lynx & Flame |
| Wall | 10 (Kathy) | 0 (Larissa) | Lynx & Fury |
| TOTAL | 31 | 20 | |

Male
| Event | Australia | Russia | Gladiators |
|---|---|---|---|
| Gauntlet | 0 (Joe) | 10 (Vladimir) | Goliath, Titan, Viking, Vulcan & Dynamite; Condor, Tornado, Commando, Dynamite & Tower |
| Hit & Run | 16 (Joe) | 4 (Vladimir) | Viking, Goliath, Commando & Taipan |
| Atlaspheres | 0 (Shane) | 2 (Yuri) | Dynamite & Condor |
| Wall | 10 (Joe) | 0 (Yuri) | Goliath & Hammer |
| TOTAL | 26 | 16 | |

Eliminator

- Female 5.5 second head start for Australia.

Kathy ran the eliminator in a time of 1.13. Elena ran the eliminator in a time of 1.45

- Male: 5 second head start for Australia

Shane ran the eliminator in a time of 1.13. Vladimir ran the eliminator in a time of 1.31.

Winners: Women Australia & Men Australia

=== Heat Two ===
Challengers:

- Karen Trent & Sue-Ann Woodwiss (Australia) Vs Elena Eirikh and Larissa Toutchinskaya (Russia)
- Wayne Neuendorf & Dimitri Moskovich (Australia) Vs Vladimir Vassiliev and Yuri Volkov (Russia)

Female
| Event | Australia | Russia | Gladiators |
|---|---|---|---|
| Whiplash | 0 (Sue-Ann) | 0 (Larissa) | Comet & Flame |
| Duel | 0 (Sue-Ann) | 5 (Larissa) | Comet & Glacier |
| Pursuit | 0 (Karen) | 0 (Elena) | Lynx & Delta |
| Swing Shot | 1 (Karen) | 0 (Elena) | Lynx & Storm |
| TOTAL | 1 | 5 | |

Male
| Event | Australia | Russia | Gladiators |
|---|---|---|---|
| Whiplash | 0 (Dimitri) | 0 (Vladimir) | Goliath & Tower |
| Duel | 0 (Dimitri) | 0 (Yuri) | Dynamite & Vulcan |
| Pursuit | 0 (Wayne) | 0 (Vladimir) | Viking & Condor |
| Swing Shot | 1 (Wayne) | 2 (Yuri) | Titan & Taipan |
| TOTAL | 1 | 2 | |

Eliminator

- Female 2 second head start for Russia

Karen ran the eliminator in a time of 1.41. Larissa ran the eliminator in a time of 1.22

- Male: 0.5 second head start for Russia

Wayne ran the eliminator in a time of 1.16. Vladimir ran the eliminator in a time of 1.01.

Winners: Women Russia & Men Russia

=== Grand Final ===
Challengers:

- Charity Crosby & Kathy McMorrow (Australia) Vs Elena Eirika and Larissa Toutchinskaya (Russia)
- Joe Lukowski & Shane Saltmarsh (Australia) Vs Vladimir Vassiliev and Yuri Volkov (Russia)

Female
| Event | Australia | Russia | Gladiators |
|---|---|---|---|
| Pyramid | 0 (Charity) | 0 (Larissa) | Comet & Delta |
| Hang Tough | 5 (Charity) | 0 (Elena) | Lynx & Fury |
| Suspension Bridge | 5 (Kathy) | 5 (Larissa) | Comet & Flame |
| Powerball | 8 (Kathy) | 0 (Elena) | Lynx, Storm & Glacier |
| TOTAL | 18 | 5 | |

Male
| Event | Australia | Russia | Gladiators |
|---|---|---|---|
| Pyramid | 0 (Shane) | 0 (Vladimir) | Goliath & Hammer |
| Hang Tough | 5 (Joe) | 0 (Yuri) | Viking & Taipan |
| Suspension Bridge | 0 (Shane) | 0 (Yuri) | Dynamite & Vulcan |
| Powerball | 6 (Shane) | 10 (Vladimir) | Goliath, Tower & Titan |
| TOTAL | 11 | 10 | |

Eliminator

- Female 6.5 second head start for Australia

Charity ran the eliminator in a time of 1.17. Larissa ran the eliminator in a time of 1.40.

- Male: 0.5 second head start for Australia

Joe ran the eliminator in a time of 1.24. Vladimir ran the eliminator in a time of 1.02.

Winners: Women Australia & Men Russia.
