= Canoeing at the 1996 Summer Olympics – Women's K-2 500 metres =

Women's K-2 500 metres at the Games of the XXVI Olympiad
- Venue: Lake Lanier
- Dates: 31 July 1996 (heats & repechage); 2 August 1996 (semifinals); 4 August 1996 (final)
- Competitors: 20 boats from 20 nations
- Winning time: 1:39.329

Medalists
1st place, gold medalist(s)		Agneta Andersson; Susanne Gunnarsson	Sweden
2nd place, silver medalist(s)		Ramona Portwich; Birgit Fischer	Germany
3rd place, bronze medalist(s)		Katrin Borchert; Anna Wood	Australia

The women's K-2 500 metres event was a pairs kayaking event conducted as part of the Canoeing at the 1996 Summer Olympics program.

== Medalists ==
Gold	Silver	Bronze
Agneta Andersson and Susanne Gunnarsson (SWE)	Birgit Fischer and Ramona Portwich (GER)	Anna Wood and Katrin Borchert (AUS)

== Results ==
=== Heats ===
20 crews entered in three heats. The top three finishers in each heat advanced to the semifinals while the rest advanced to the repechages.

Heat 1
1.	Birgit Fischer and Ramona Portwich (GER)	1:45.504	QS
2.	Ingrid Haralamow and Daniela Baumer (SUI)	1:45.764	QS
3.	Sanda Toma and Viorica Iordache (ROU)	1:47.200	QS
4.	Hanna Balabanova and Kateryna Yurchenko (UKR)	1:48.436	QR
5.	Bonka Pindzheva and Neli Zafirova (BUL)	1:48.652	QR
6.	Tatiana Levina and Inna Isakova (UZB)	1:50.544	QR
7.	Renata Hernández and Sandra Rojas (MEX)	1:51.252	QR
Heat 2
1.	Agneta Andersson and Susanne Gunnarsson (SWE)	1:43.022	QS
2.	Izaskun Aramburu and Beatriz Manchón (ESP)	1:44.038	QS
3.	Izabela Dylewska-Światowiak and Elżbieta Urbańczyk (POL)	1:44.906	QS
4.	Larisa Kosorukova and Nataliya Guly (RUS)	1:47.186	QR
5.	DeAnne Hemmens and Lia Rousset (USA)	1:47.914	QR
6.	Jitka Janáčková and Pavlína Jobánková (CZE)	1:51.346	QR
7.	Helen Gilby and Alison Thorogood (GBR)	1:51.386	QR
Heat 3
1.	Rita Kőbán and Szilvia Mednyánszki (HUN)	1:43.313	QS
2.	Anna Wood and Katrin Borchert (AUS)	1:43.633	QS
3.	Marie-Josée Gibeau and Corrina Kennedy (CAN)	1:44.685	QS
4.	Sabine Kleinhenz and Séverine Loyau (FRA)	1:46.989	QR
5.	Ning Menghua and Hu Dongmei (CHN)	1:50.721	QR
6.	Chieko Akagi and Asako Watanabe (JPN)	1:52.109	QR

=== Repechages ===
The top four finishers in each repechage and the fastest fifth-place finisher advanced to the semifinals.

Repechage 1
1.	Sabine Kleinhenz and Séverine Loyau (FRA)	1:51.417	QS
2.	DeAnne Hemmens and Lia Rousset (USA)	1:52.669	QS
3.	Hanna Balabanova and Kateryna Yurchenko (UKR)	1:54.373	QS
4.	Jitka Janáčková and Pavlína Jobánková (CZE)	1:55.377	QS
5.	Renata Hernández and Sandra Rojas (MEX)	1:55.801	QS
Repechage 2
1.	Larisa Kosorukova and Nataliya Guly (RUS)	1:52.520	QS
2.	Ning Menghua and Hu Dongmei (CHN)	1:53.544	QS
3.	Bonka Pindzheva and Neli Zafirova (BUL)	1:53.644	QS
4.	Helen Gilby and Alison Thorogood (GBR)	1:55.088	QS
5.	Tatiana Levina and Inna Isakova (UZB)	1:56.896
6.	Chieko Akagi and Asako Watanabe (JPN)	1:57.944

=== Semifinals ===
The top four finishers in each semifinal and the fastest fifth-place finisher advanced to the final.

Semifinal 1
1.	Rita Kőbán and Szilvia Mednyánszki (HUN)	1:42.789	QF
2.	Birgit Fischer and Ramona Portwich (GER)	1:43.069	QF
3.	Izaskun Aramburu and Beatriz Manchón (ESP)	1:44.433	QF
4.	Marie-Josée Gibeau and Corrina Kennedy (CAN)	1:44.461	QF
5.	Sabine Kleinhenz and Séverine Loyau (FRA)	1:46.589	QF
6.	Sanda Toma and Viorica Iordache (ROU)	1:47.061
7.	Hanna Balabanova and Kateryna Yurchenko (UKR)	1:48.857
8.	Ning Menghua and Hu Dongmei (CHN)	1:49.189
9.	Helen Gilby and Alison Thorogood (GBR)	1:49.849
Semifinal 2
1.	Agneta Andersson and Susanne Gunnarsson (SWE)	1:43.521	QF
2.	Anna Wood and Katrin Borchert (AUS)	1:43.729	QF
3.	Izabela Dylewska-Światowiak and Elżbieta Urbańczyk (POL)	1:45.190	QF
4.	Larisa Kosorukova and Nataliya Guly (RUS)	1:45.505	QF
5.	Ingrid Haralamow and Daniela Baumer (SUI)	1:46.629
6.	Bonka Pindzheva and Neli Zafirova (BUL)	1:48.313
7.	Jitka Janáčková and Pavlína Jobánková (CZE)	1:49.125
8.	DeAnne Hemmens and Lia Rousset (USA)	1:49.465
9.	Renata Hernández and Sandra Rojas (MEX)	1:52.053

=== Final ===
The final was held on August 4.

Gold	Agneta Andersson and Susanne Gunnarsson (SWE)	1:39.329
Silver	Birgit Fischer and Ramona Portwich (GER)	1:39.689
Bronze	Anna Wood and Katrin Borchert (AUS)	1:40.641
4.	Rita Kőbán and Szilvia Mednyánszki (HUN)	1:40.893
5.	Marie-Josée Gibeau and Corrina Kennedy (CAN)	1:41.313
6.	Izaskun Aramburu and Beatriz Manchón (ESP)	1:42.621
7.	Izabela Dylewska-Światowiak and Elżbieta Urbańczyk (POL)	1:42.753
8.	Larisa Kosorukova and Nataliya Guly (RUS)	1:43.237
9.	Sabine Kleinhenz and Séverine Loyau (FRA)	1:43.449

Andersson's Olympic medal total was brought to seven with three gold, two silver, and two bronze. Fischer's silver matched the total of Sweden's Gert Fredriksson with eight. Australia's bronze medal crew was foreign-born with Wood (formerly Annemarie Cox) from the Netherlands and Borchert from Germany.
