= Itzel (disambiguation) =

Itzel or Ixchel is the Mayan goddess of midwifery and medicine. It also may refer to:

== Personal name ==
=== Given name ===
- Laura Itzel Castillo (born 1957), Mexican architect and politician
- Katia Itzel García, Mexican referee
- Itzel Nayeli García Montaño (born 1995), Mexican criminal and a suspected spree killer
- Itzel González (born 1994), Mexican footballer
- Itzel Manjarrez (born 1990), Mexican taekwondo athlete
- Itzel Reza (born 1979), Mexican sprint canoer
- Itzel Ríos de la Mora (born 1978), Mexican politician

=== Surname ===
- Adam Itzel Jr. (1864–1893), American conductor and composer
- Jack Itzel (1924–1966), American footballer
- Sandra Itzel (born 1993), Mexican actress

== See also ==
- Conasprella ixchel, a marine gastropod species
- Ixchela, a genus of spiders
