= Loyau =

Loyau is a surname. Notable people with the surname include:

- George E. Loyau (1835–1898), English-born traveller, poet, and historian in Australia
- Séverine Loyau (born 1973), French sprint canoeist
