= Gladiators (Australian TV series) series 2 =

Gladiators
- Season 2
- Starring: Kimberley Joseph; Mike Hammond
- No. of episodes: 15

Release
- Original network: Seven Network
- Original release: 2 September – 2 December 1995

Series chronology
- ← Previous; Series 1 Next → Series 3

The second series of Gladiators began airing on Seven Network on 2 September 1995.

Fifteen episodes were filmed for this series. Once again the shows were filmed at the Brisbane Entertainment Centre between 5 July and 19 July.

Kimberley Joseph returned to host along with Mike Hammond, who replaced Aaron Pedersen. Play-by-play commentary was again performed by Tony Schibeci. John Alexander was unable to return due to his commitments to Wimbledon and was replaced by Mike Whitney. Once again, John Forsyth acted as assistant referee and the Kix cheerleaders returned to perform in the background of the events. In Heats 2 and 8, Forsyth was absent for unknown reasons, and was replaced by Neil Waldron for those Heats.

Winners of the heats received a Sony PlayStation and sound system with CDs. Runners-up received a titanium watch. The grand final winners won a car.

== Gladiators ==
=== Male ===
- Commando - Geoff Barker
- Condor - Alistair Gibb
- Cougar - Ashley Buck
- Hammer - Mark McGaw
- Predator - Tony Forrow
- Taipan - Michael Melksham
- Tower - Ron Reeve
- Vulcan - John Seru

Force (John Gergelifi) retired after Series 1 due to injury. In his place were two new recruits, Commando and Predator.

=== Female ===
- Blade - Bev Carter
- Cheeta - Nicky Davico
- Delta - Karen Alley
- Flame - Lynda Byrnes
- Fury - Julie Saunders
- Rebel - Barbara Kendell
- Storm - Charlene Machin

== Events ==
Atlasphere, Duel, Gauntlet, Hang Tough, Hit & Run, Powerball, Pyramid, Suspension Bridge, Tilt and Wall returned from Series 1, as well as the Eliminator which featured as the final event in every show.

Three new events, Swingshot, Pursuit and Whiplash were introduced all of them having already featured in either or both of the American or British TV series.

== Shows ==
Once again fifteen shows were filmed in a progressive competition. Each show featured four events along with the Eliminator. The winner of the Eliminator would progress to the next round.

Kimberley and Mike stood with the winners of the show as they said their goodbyes.

Winning challengers are in bold.

Episode	Contest	Original airdate	Challengers (Female)	Challengers (Male)	Events
01	Heat 1	2 September 1995	**Leanne Hickey** Vs Bernadine Wilde/Jillian Ikin^{1}	**Tommy Le** Vs Rowan Cameron	Hang Tough, Powerball, Pursuit, Wall
02	Heat 2	9 September 1995	**Kathy McMorrow** Vs Claire Sudran	**Scott Brewer** Vs Jonathon Dunne	Powerball, Swingshot, Whiplash, Pyramid
03	Heat 3	16 September 1995	Kim McGaw Vs **Charity Crosby**	**Kris Lacey** Vs the real "Kane Winther"	Powerball, Duel, Pyramid, Tilt^{2}
04	Heat 4	23 September 1995	Donna Talbot Vs **Kim Knott**	Scott Bannan Vs **Neil Campbell**	Hang Tough, Gauntlet, Atlasphere, Suspension Bridge
05	Heat 5	30 September 1995	**Lourene Bevaart** Vs Rhona Broughton	Martin Ryan Vs **Dominic Deligny**	Pyramid, Hit & Run, Duel, Swingshot
06	Heat 6	7 October 1995	Melanie Sawtell Vs **Karen Trent**	Mark Laboyrie^{3} Vs **Joe Lukowski**	Gauntlet, Duel, Pursuit, Hang Tough
07	Heat 7	14 October 1995	**Nicholle Singleton** Vs Tamzin Van De Weg	**Steve Smith** Vs Russell Perring	Suspension Bridge, Pyramid, Atlasphere, Whiplash
08	Heat 8	21 October 1995	**Sandra Nori** Vs Bellinda Panizza	**Shane Saltmarsh** Vs Matthew Dugard	Gauntlet, Swingshot, Pursuit, Hang Tough
09	Quarter Final 1	28 October 1995	**Kathy McMorrow** Vs Kim Knott	**Shane Saltmarsh** Vs Neil Campbell	Suspension Bridge, Powerball, Wall, Swingshot
10	Quarter Final 2	4 November 1995	**Charity Crosby** Vs Sandra Nori/ Claire Sudran ^{4}	Dominic Deligny Vs **Scott Brewer**	Hang Tough, Pyramid, Pursuit, Duel
11	Quarter Final 3	11 November 1995	**Lourene Bevaart** Vs Nicholle Singleton	Tommy Le Vs **Joe Lukowski**	Gauntlet, Pursuit, Pyramid, Hit & Run
12	Quarter Final 4	18 November 1995	Leanne Hickey Vs **Karen Trent**	**Kris Lacey** Vs Steve Smith	Duel, Hang Tough, Atlasphere, Wall
13	Semi Final 1	25 November 1995	**Lourene Bevaart** Vs Karen Trent	**Joe Lukowski** Vs Scott Brewer	Wall, Gauntlet, Swingshot, Hit & Run^{5}
13	Semi Final 2	25 November 1995	**Kathy McMorrow** Vs Charity Crossby	Kris Lacey Vs **Shane Saltmarsh**	Powerball, Hang Tough, Suspension Bridge, Wall
14	Final	2 December 1995	**Lourene Bevaart** Vs Kathy McMorrow	**Shane Saltmarsh** Vs Joe Lukowski	Gauntlet, Swingshot, Duel, Pyramid

^{1}Replaced Bernadine after she was injured in Powerball.
^{2}This episode would mark Tilt's last appearance in the show.
^{3}Mark was injured after falling from Hang Tough and withdrew from the competition before the Eliminator.
^{4}Replaced Sandra after she was injured on Pyramid.
^{5}This marks Rebel's last appearance as a Gladiator.

== Episode summary ==
=== Heat 1 ===
Original airdate: 2 September 1995
Challengers: Leanne Hickey v Bernadine Wilde/Jillian Ikin, Tommy Le v Rowan Cameron

Female
Event	Leanne	Bernadine/Jillian	Gladiators
Hang Tough	0	10	Blade & Fury
Powerball	2	2^{1}	Cheeta, Flame & Rebel
Pursuit	0	0	Cheeta & Fury
Wall	0	0	Storm & Delta
TOTAL	2	12	

Male
Event	Tommy	Rowan	Gladiators
Hang Tough	0	5	Cougar & Taipan
Powerball	0	0	Predator, Tower & Vulcan
Pursuit	3	10	Taipan & Tower
Wall	5	10	Condor & Commando
TOTAL	8	25	

Eliminator

- Female: 5 second head start for Jillian
- Male: 8.5 second head start for Rowan
- Winners: Leanne Hickey & Tommy Le

^{1} Bernadine was injured following a tackle from Cheeta in Powerball, Jillian Ikin played the remainder of the games

=== Heat 2 ===
Original airdate: 9 September 1995
Challengers: Kathy McMorrow v Claire Sudran, Scott Brewer v Jonathon Dunne

Female
Event	Kathy	Claire	Gladiators
Powerball	8	6	Delta, Fury & Rebel
Swing Shot	9	1	Storm & Blade
Whiplash	0	0	Flame & Cheeta
Pyramid	0	0	Cheeta & Fury
TOTAL	17	7	

Male
Event	Scott	Jonathon	Gladiators
Powerball	6	6	Commando, Hammer & Predator
Swing Shot	3	5	Taipan & Cougar
Whiplash	0	0	Tower & Vulcan
Pyramid	0	0	Condor & Predator
TOTAL	9	11	

Eliminator

- Female: 5 second head start for Kathy
- Male: 1 second head start for Jonathan
- Winners: Kathy McMorrow & Scott Brewer

=== Heat 3 ===
Original airdate: 16 September 1995
Challengers: Kim McGaw v Charity Crosby, Kris Lacey v Kane Winther

Female
Event	Kim	Charity	Gladiators
Powerball	2	0	Blade, Rebel & Storm
Duel	0	0	Storm & Flame
Pyramid	0	10	Fury & Delta
Tilt	0	0	Cheeta & Flame
TOTAL	2	10	

Male
Event	Kris	Kane	Gladiators
Powerball	2	4	Commando, Condor & Taipan
Duel	0	0	Tower & Vulcan
Pyramid	0	0	Condor & Cougar
Tilt	5	0	Tower & Predator
TOTAL	7	4	

Eliminator

- Female: 4 second head start for Charity
- Male: 1.5 second head start for Kris
- Winners: Charity Crosby & Kris Lacey

=== Heat 4 ===
Original airdate: 23 September 1995
Challengers: Donna Talbot v Kim Knott, Scott Bannan v Neil Campbell

Female
Event	Donna	Kim	Gladiators
Hang Tough	0	10	Blade & Fury
Gauntlet	10	0	Rebel, Cheeta, Flame, Fury & Blade
Atlasphere	0	0	Rebel & Delta
Suspension Bridge	0	0	Flame & Storm
TOTAL	10	10	

Male
Event	Scott	Neil	Gladiators
Hang Tough	0	5	Commando & Condor
Gauntlet	0	0	Commando, Predator, Vulcan, Condor & Tower
Atlasphere	4	0	Predator & Condor
Suspension Bridge	0	0	Tower & Vulcan
TOTAL	4	5	

Eliminator

- Female: No headstart
- Male: 0.5 second head start for Neil
- Winners: Kim Knott & Neil Campbell

=== Heat 5 ===
Original airdate: 30 September 1995
Challengers: Lourene Bevaart v Rhona Broughton, Martin Ryan v Dominic Deligny

Female
Event	Lourene	Rhona	Gladiators
Pyramid	10	0	Cheeta & Blade
Hit & Run	12	12	Blade, Rebel, Delta & Fury
Duel	5	0	Flame & Storm
Swing Shot	3	1	Storm & Delta
TOTAL	30	13	

Male
Event	Martin	Dominic	Gladiators
Pyramid	0	0	Condor & Tower
Hit & Run	8	12	Vulcan, Predator, Commando & Tower
Duel	0	0	Vulcan & Tower
Swing Shot	6	2	Predator & Condor
TOTAL	14	14	

Eliminator

- Female: 8.5 second head start for Lourene
- Male: No head start
- Winners: Lourene Bevaart & Dominic Deligny

=== Heat 6 ===
Original airdate: 7 October 1995
Challengers: Melanie Sawtell v Karen Trent, Mark Laboyrie v Joe Lukowski

Female
Event	Melanie	Karen	Gladiators
Gauntlet	5	0	Cheeta, Storm, Rebel, Fury & Flame
Duel	0	0	Storm & Flame
Pursuit	0	0	Blade & Fury
Hang Tough	0	5	Cheeta & Delta
TOTAL	5	5	

Male
Event	Mark	Joe	Gladiators
Gauntlet	0	0	Predator, Vulcan, Commando, Condor & Tower
Duel	10	0	Tower & Vulcan
Pursuit	5	10	Predator & Condor
Hang Tough	0	10	Condor & Commando
TOTAL	15	20	

Eliminator

- Female: No head start
- Male: Mark is injured in Hang Tough and cannot run eliminator
- Winners: Joe Lukowski & Karen Trent

=== Heat 7 ===
Original airdate: 14 October 1995
Challengers: Nicholle Singleton v Tamzin Van De Weg, Steve Smith v Russell Perring

Female
Event	Nicholle	Tamzin	Gladiators
Suspension Bridge	0	0	Rebel & Storm
Pyramid	0	0	Blade & Delta
Atlasphere	2	2	Fury & Delta
Whiplash	10	0	Cheeta & Flame
TOTAL	12	2	

Male
Event	Steve	Russell	Gladiators
Suspension Bridge	0	10	Tower & Vulcan
Pyramid	10	0	Condor & Predator
Atlasphere	4	0	Commando & Tower
Whiplash	0	0	Predator & Vulcan
TOTAL	14	10	

Eliminator

- Female: 5 second head start for Nicholle
- Male: 2 second head start for Steve
- Winners: Nicholle Singleton & Steve Smith

=== Heat 8 ===
Original airdate: 21 October 1995
Challengers: Sandra Nori v Bellinda Panizza, Shane Saltmarsh v Matthew Dugard

Female
Event	Sandra	Bellinda	Gladiators
Gauntlet	5	10	Delta, Storm, Fury, Cheeta & Flame
Swing Shot	1	1	Blade & Flame
Pursuit	0	10	Storm & Rebel
Hang Tough	10	0	Blade & Fury
TOTAL	16	21	

Male
Event	Shane	Matthew	Gladiators
Gauntlet	5	0	Condor, Vulcan, Predator, Hammer & Tower
Swing Shot	4	0	Tower & Cougar
Pursuit	10	0	Commando & Predator
Hang Tough	10	10	Cougar & Taipan
TOTAL	29	10	

Eliminator

- Female: 2.5 second head start for Bellinda
- Male: 9.5 second head start for Shane
- Winners: Sandra Nori & Shane Saltmarsh

=== Quarter-Final 1 ===
Original airdate: 28 October 1995
Challengers: Kathy McMorrow v Kim Knott, Shane Saltmarsh v Neil Campbell

Female
Event	Kathy	Kim	Gladiators
Suspension Bridge	0	0	Flame & Storm
Powerball	8	6	Cheeta, Delta & Fury
Wall	10	0	Blade & Storm
Swing Shot	4	1	Fury & Delta
TOTAL	22	7	

Male
Event	Shane	Neil	Gladiators
Suspension Bridge	0	0	Tower & Vulcan
Powerball	2	2	Commando, Hammer & Predator
Wall	0	0	Condor & Commando
Swing Shot	1	0	Taipan & Cougar
TOTAL	3	2	

Eliminator

- Female: 7.5 second head start for Kathy
- Male: 0.5 second head start for Shane
- Winners: Kathy McMorrow & Shane Saltmarsh

=== Quarter-Final 2 ===
Original airdate: 4 November 1995
Challengers: Charity Crosby v Sandra Nori/Claire Sudran, Dominique Deligny v Scott Brewer

Female
Event	Charity	Sandra/Claire	Gladiators
Hang Tough	5	0	Fury & Blade
Pyramid	0	0	Delta & Cheeta
Pursuit	0	0	Storm & Blade
Duel	5	0	Storm & Flame
TOTAL	10	0	

Male
Event	Dominique	Scott	Gladiators
Hang Tough	0	10	Taipan & Cougar
Pyramid	0	0	Hammer & Condor
Pursuit	0	10	Condor & Predator
Duel	0	0	Tower & Vulcan
TOTAL	0	20	

Eliminator

- Female: 5 second head start for Charity
- Male: 10 second head start for Scott
- Winners: Charity Crosby & Scott Brewer

=== Quarter-Final 3 ===
Original airdate: 11 November 1995
Challengers: Lourene Bevaart v Nicholle Singleton, Tommy Le v Joe Lukowski

Female
Event	Lourene	Nicholle	Gladiators
Gauntlet	10	5	Delta, Cheeta, Storm, Fury & Flame
Pursuit	0	0	Storm & Fury
Pyramid	0	0	Cheeta & Delta
Hit and Run	12	6	Blade, Cheeta, Flame & Rebel
TOTAL	22	11	

Male
Event	Tommy	Joe	Gladiators
Gauntlet	0	0	Hammer, Vulcan, Predator, Commando & Tower
Pursuit	3	10	Condor & Predator
Pyramid	0	0	Hammer & Condor
Hit and Run	0	14	Vulcan, Taipan, Tower & Cougar
TOTAL	3	24	

Eliminator

- Female: 5.5 second head start for Lourene
- Male: 10.5 second head start for Joe
- Winners: Lourene Bevaart & Joe Lukowski

=== Quarter-Final 4 ===
Original airdate: 18 November 1995
Challengers: Leanne Hickey v Karen Trent, Kris Lacey v Steve Smith

Female
Event	Leanne	Karen	Gladiators
Duel	0	0	Storm & Flame
Hang Tough	5	0	Fury & Blade
Atlasphere	0	4	Delta & Flame
Wall	5	10	Fury & Blade
TOTAL	10	14	

Male
Event	Kris	Steve	Gladiators
Duel	0	0	Tower & Vulcan
Hang Tough	0	0	Cougar & Taipan
Atlasphere	6	6	Predator & Hammer
Wall	0	0	Commando & Condor
TOTAL	6	6	

Eliminator

- Female: 2 second head start for Karen
- Male: No head start
- Winners: Karen Trent & Kris Lacey

=== Semi-final 1 ===
Original airdate: 25 November 1995
Challengers: Lourene Bevaart v Karen Trent, Joe Lukowski v Scott Brewer

Female
Event	Lourene	Karen	Gladiators
Wall	0	10	Fury & Blade
Gauntlet	10	5	Storm, Delta, Cheeta, Fury & Flame
Swing Shot	1	1	Flame & Delta
Hit and Run	12	12	Cheeta, Blade, Delta & Rebel
TOTAL	23	28	

Male
Event	Joe	Scott	Gladiators
Wall	10	5	Taipan & Commando
Gauntlet	5	0	Predator, Vulcan, Hammer, Commando & Tower
Swing Shot	3	0	Condor & Taipan
Hit and Run	12	14	Predator, Condor, Hammer & Vulcan
TOTAL	30	19	

Eliminator

- Female: 2.5 second head start for Karen
- Male: 4.5 second head start for Joe
- Winners: Lourene Bevaart & Joe Lukowski

=== Semi-final 2 ===
Original airdate: 25 November 1995
Challengers: Kathy McMorrow v Charity Crosby, Kris Lacey v Shane Saltmarsh

Female
Event	Kathy	Charity	Gladiators
Powerball	9	0	Cheeta, Fury & Storm
Hang Tough	0	0	Blade & Fury
Suspension Bridge	0	5	Flame & Storm
Wall	10	0	Storm & Delta
TOTAL	19	5	

Male
Event	Kris	Shane	Gladiators
Powerball	4	2	Hammer, Predator & Tower
Hang Tough	5	5	Cougar & Taipan
Suspension Bridge	0	0	Tower & Vulcan
Wall	0	10	Condor & Commando
TOTAL	9	17	

Eliminator

- Female: 7 second head start for Kathy
- Male: 4 second head start for Shane
- Winners: Kathy McMorrow & Shane Saltmarsh

=== Grand Final ===
Original airdate: 2 December 1995
Challengers: Lourene Bevaart v Kathy McMorrow, Shane Saltmarsh v Joe Lukowski

Female
Event	Lourene	Kathy	Gladiators
Gauntlet	10	5	Storm, Blade, Cheeta, Fury & Flame
Swing Shot	1	2	Fury & Blade
Duel	10	0	Flame & Storm
Pyramid	0	0	Cheeta & Delta
TOTAL	21	7	

Male
Event	Shane	Joe	Gladiators
Gauntlet	0	0	Vulcan, Commando, Predator, Hammer & Tower
Swing Shot	0	0	Cougar & Taipan
Duel	0	0	Vulcan & Tower
Pyramid	10	5	Condor & Hammer
TOTAL	10	5	

Eliminator

- Female: 7 second start for Lourene
- Male: 2.5 second start for Shane
- Series 2 Winners: Lourene Bevaart & Shane Saltmarsh

== Production ==
Production began in May 1995 following the instant success of the first series. Tryouts were held in May whilst the producers decided to bring in new events. Filming began in the Brisbane Entertainment Centre on 5 July with audience figures of 5,000. Former Gladiator Force attended the Series Two Wrap Party.

Series two began broadcast in August 1995 with production for the next series beginning in October.
