= Gladiators (Australian TV series) series 1 =

Gladiators
- Season 1
- No. of episodes: 15

Release
- Original network: Seven Network
- Original release: 29 April – 5 August 1995

Series chronology
- Next → Series 2

The first series of Gladiators began airing on Seven Network on 29 April 1995, following versions of the Gladiators format in United States, United Kingdom and Finland. The series closely resembled the British series albeit with just four events and the Eliminator.

Fifteen episodes were filmed in a progressive competition at the Brisbane Entertainment Centre between 24 March and 2 April. Kimberley Joseph and Aaron Pedersen presented the show whilst play by play commentary was by Tony Schibeci. John Alexander acted as referee and John Forsyth as assistant referee. Cheerleaders performed in the background of the events.

Winners of the heats received a Sony music system and a selection of CD's valued to $2,000. The runners up received a set of gym apparatus. The winners of the final won a car (Hyundai Sonata).

== Gladiators ==
=== Male ===
- Condor - Alistair Gibb
- Cougar - Ashley Buck
- Force - John Gergelifi
- Hammer - Mark McGaw
- Taipan - Michael Melksham
- Tower - Ron Reeve
- Vulcan - John Seru

Force suffered an injury in Atlasphere in the third quarter final and had to retire from the show.

=== Female ===
- Blade - Bev Carter
- Cheeta - Nicky Davico
- Delta - Karen Alley
- Flame - Lynda Byrnes
- Fury - Julie Saunders
- Rebel - Barbara Kendell
- Storm - Charlene Machin

== Events ==
Atlasphere, Duel, Gauntlet, Hang Tough, Hit & Run, Powerball, Pyramid, Suspension Bridge, Tilt and Wall were played over Series 1.

The Eliminator featured as the final event in every show.

== Shows ==
Fifteen shows along with an unaired pilot were filmed with the televised shows taking the form of a progressive competition. Each show featured four events along with the Eliminator. The winner of the Eliminator would progress to the next round.

Winning challengers are in bold.

Episode	Contest	Original airdate	Challengers (Female)	Challengers (Male)	Events
N/A	Unaired Pilot^{1}	N/A	Lisa Vs Jane	Brian Vs James	Powerball, Wall, Hang Tough, Duel
01	Heat 1	29 April 1995	Heather Marychurch Vs **Gina Good**	Clinton Barter Vs **Howard Arbuthnot**	Gauntlet, Pyramid, Powerball, Hit & Run
02	Heat 2	6 May 1995	**Bernie Withers** Vs Tracey Nicholson	**Andrew Halliday** Vs Adam Cooney	Suspension Bridge, Hang Tough, Atlasphere, Tilt
03	Heat 3	13 May 1995	**Sabrina Hooyman** Vs Carol-Anne Horvath	**David Wallis** Vs Paul Vella	Hit & Run, Wall, Duel, Powerball
04	Heat 4	20 May 1995	**Karen Swansborough** Vs Hillary Ord	**Tony Langdon** Vs Corey Parker	Pyramid, Tilt, Gauntlet, Suspension Bridge
05	Heat 5	27 May 1995	**Nellie Baker** Vs Fernanda Lacey	**Ashley Martin** Vs Alex Sanz	Atlasphere, Wall, Hang Tough, Duel
06	Heat 6	3 June 1995	**Teresa Brett** Vs Alison Jackson	**Rod McQueen** Vs John Powell	Gauntlet, Atlasphere, Hang Tough, Suspension Bridge
07	Heat 7	10 June 1995	Annie Alderson Vs **Kerry Warman**	Mark Brine and **Ian Jacobs**	Powerball, Hang Tough, Wall, Duel
08	Heat 8	17 June 1995	**Tania Logan** Vs Donna Sutor/ Kathy Katzourakis^{2}	**Rhett Foreman** Vs Andrew Strickland	Pyramid, Gauntlet, Duel, Powerball
09	Quarter Final 1	24 June 1995	Sabrina Hooyman Vs **Nellie Baker**	Ashley Martin Vs **David Wallis**	Pyramid, Tilt, Wall, Suspension Bridge
10	Quarter Final 2	1 July 1995	Kerry Warman Vs **Bernie Withers**	**Andrew Halliday** Vs Ian Jacobs	Powerball, Duel, Hit & Run, Pyramid
11	Quarter Final 3	8 July 1995	**Teresa Brett** Vs Karen Swansborough	**Rod McQueen** Vs Tony Langdon	Wall, Atlasphere^{3}, Hang Tough, Gauntlet
12	Quarter Final 4	15 July 1995	**Fernanda Lacey**^{4} Vs Tania Logan	Howard Arbuthnot Vs **Rhett Foreman**	Duel, Pyramid, Hit & Run, Powerball
13	Semi Final 1	22 July 1995	**Teresa Brett** Vs Nellie Baker	**Dave Wallis** Vs Rod McQueen	Suspension Bridge, Pyramid, Powerball, Hang Tough
14	Semi Final 2	29 July 1995	Fernanda Lacey Vs **Bernie Withers**	**Andrew Halliday** Vs Rhett Foreman	Duel, Wall, Tilt, Gauntlet
15	Final	5 August 1995	Teresa Brett Vs **Bernie Withers**	Dave Wallis Vs **Andrew Halliday**	Gauntlet, Duel, Pyramid, Hang Tough

^{1} The challengers in this episode were actually members of the production crew and changed throughout the episode. The names given were just for filming purposes. The headstarts given in the Eliminator were not based on points scored in the events.
^{2}Replaced Donna after she fell on her pugil stick and injured her leg.
^{3}This would be the last ever appearance by Force after falling over in his Atlasphere and injuring his leg.
^{4}Replaced Gina Goode who having won her heat was unable to continue in the Quarter finals due to an ankle injury sustained in Powerball in her heat.

== Episode summary ==
=== Heat 1 ===
Original airdate: 29 April 1995
Challengers: Heather Marychurch v Gina Good, Clinton Barter v Howard Arbuthnot

Female
Event	Heather	Gina	Gladiators
Gauntlet	0	5	Rebel, Cheeta, Blade, Fury & Delta
Pyramid	0	0	Flame & Cheeta
Powerball	2	2	Delta, Flame & Storm
Hit and Run	2	8	Delta, Rebel, Fury & Cheeta
TOTAL	4	15	

Male
Event	Clinton	Howard	Gladiators
Gauntlet	0	0	Vulcan, Condor, Cougar, Force & Tower
Pyramid	10	0	Taipan & Hammer
Powerball	0	0	Cougar, Hammer & Vulcan
Hit and Run	0	0	Taipan, Tower, Condor & Force
TOTAL	10	0	

Eliminator

- Female: 5.5 second head start for Gina
- Male: 5 second head start for Clinton
- Winners: Gina Good & Howard Arbuthnot

=== Heat 2 ===
Original airdate: 6 May 1995
Challengers: Bernadette Withers v Tracey Nicholson, Andrew Halliday v Adam Cooney

Female
Event	Bernadette	Tracey	Gladiators
Suspension Bridge	0	0	Flame & Storm
Hang Tough	0	0	Blade & Fury
Atlaspheres	2	4	Delta & Rebel
Tilt	10	5	Cheeta & Flame
TOTAL	12	9	

Male
Event	Andrew	Adam	Gladiators
Suspension Bridge	0	0	Tower & Condor
Hang Tough	10	5	Taipan & Cougar
Atlaspheres	6	2	Hammer & Condor
Tilt	10	5	Taipan & Tower
TOTAL	26	12	

Eliminator

- Female: 1.5 second head start for Bernadette
- Male: 7 second head start for Andrew
- Winners: Bernadette Withers & Andrew Halliday

=== Heat 3 ===
Original airdate: 13 May 1995
Challengers: Sabrina Hooyman v Carol-Anne Horvath, David Wallis v Paul Vella

Female
Event	Sabrina	Carol-Anne	Gladiators
Hit and Run	6	6	Blade, Delta, Cheeta & Rebel
Wall	10	5	Blade & Storm
Duel	5	0	Storm & Flame
Powerball	0	4	Delta, Flame & Rebel
TOTAL	21	15	

Male
Event	David	Paul	Gladiators
Hit and Run	4	0	Hammer, Force, Cougar & Taipan
Wall	0	0	Cougar & Condor
Duel	5	0	Vulcan & Tower
Powerball	7	3	Cougar, Hammer & Taipan
TOTAL	16	3	

Eliminator

- Female: 3 second head start for Sabrina
- Male: 6.5 second head start for David
- Winners: Sabrina Hooyman & David Wallis

=== Heat 4 ===
Original airdate: 20 May 1995
Challengers: Karen Swansborough v Hillary Ord, Corey Parker v Tony Langdon

Female
Event	Karen	Hillary	Gladiators
Pyramid	0	0	Fury & Cheeta
Tilt	10	0	Storm & Flame
Gauntlet	10	5	Fury, Delta, Rebel, Blade & Flame
Suspension Bridge	10	0	Rebel & Storm
TOTAL	30	5	

Male
Event	Corey	Tony	Gladiators
Pyramid	0	0	Condor & Cougar
Tilt	5	5	Vulcan & Tower
Gauntlet	10	5	Condor, Vulcan, Hammer, Force & Tower
Suspension Bridge	0	10	Taipan & Force
TOTAL	15	20	

Eliminator

- Female: 12.5 second head start for Karen
- Male: 2.5 second head start for Tony
- Winners: Karen Swansborough & Tony Langdon

=== Heat 5 ===
Original airdate: 27 May 1995
Challengers: Nellie Baker v Fernanda Lacey, Ashley Martin v Alex Sanz

Female
Event	Nellie	Fernanda	Gladiators
Atlasphere	2	2	Cheeta & Rebel
Wall	5	10	Fury & Delta
Hang Tough	10	10	Cheeta & Blade
Duel	5	5	Storm & Flame
TOTAL	22	27	

Male
Event	Ashley	Alex	Gladiators
Atlasphere	6	4	Tower & Hammer
Wall	10	5	Taipan & Hammer
Hang Tough	10	5	Condor & Cougar
Duel	5	0	Tower & Vulcan
TOTAL	31	14	

Eliminator

- Female: 2.5 second head start for Fernanda
- Male: 8.5 second head start for Ashley
- Winners: Nellie Baker & Ashley Martin

=== Heat 6 ===
Original airdate: 3 June 1995
Challengers: Teresa Brett v Alison Jackson, Rod McQueen v John Powell

Female
Event	Teresa	Alison	Gladiators
Gauntlet	5	10	Storm, Rebel, Delta, Cheeta & Blade
Atlasphere	2	2	Flame & Storm
Hang Tough	0	0	Blade & Cheeta
Suspension Bridge	0	10	Flame & Rebel
TOTAL	7	22	

Male
Event	Rod	John	Gladiators
Gauntlet	0	0	Tower, Cougar, Vulcan, Condor & Hammer
Atlaspheres	8	2	Force & Condor
Hang Tough	5	5	Taipan & Hammer
Suspension Bridge	0	10	Tower & Hammer
TOTAL	13	17	

Eliminator

- Female: 7.5 second head start for Alison
- Male: 2 second head start for John
- Winners: Teresa Brett & Rod McQueen

=== Heat 7 ===
Original airdate: 10 June 1995
Challengers: Annie Alderson v Kerry Warman, Mark Brine v Ian Jacobs

Female
Event	Annie	Kerry	Gladiators
Powerball	6	6	Cheeta, Delta & Rebel
Hang Tough	5	5	Blade & Fury
Wall	5	10	Storm & Blade
Duel	5	5	Storm & Flame
TOTAL	21	26	

Male
Event	Mark	Ian	Gladiators
Powerball	4	3	Hammer, Taipan & Vulcan
Hang Tough	0	5	Cougar & Taipan
Wall	10	5	Condor & Cougar
Duel	5	10	Tower & Force
TOTAL	19	23	

Eliminator

- Female: 2.5 second head start for Kerry
- Male: 2 second head start for Ian
- Winners: Kerry Warman & Ian Jacobs

=== Heat 8 ===
Original airdate: 17 June 1995
Challengers: Tania Logan v Donna Sutor/Kathy Katzourakis, Rhett Foreman v Andrew Strickland

Female
Event	Tania	Donna/Kathy	Gladiators
Pyramid	0	0	Delta & Blade
Gauntlet	0	0	Flame, Rebel, Cheeta, Blade & Delta
Duel	5	0	Flame & Storm
Powerball	2	4	Cheeta, Rebel & Storm
TOTAL	7	4	

Male
Event	Rhett	Andrew	Gladiators
Pyramid	0	10	Condor & Vulcan
Gauntlet	5	5	Force, Cougar, Hammer, Condor & Tower
Duel	0	0	Cougar & Taipan
Powerball	0	0	Hammer, Tower & Vulcan
TOTAL	5	15	

Eliminator

- Female: 1.5 second head start for Tania
- Male: 5 second head start for Andrew
- Winners: Tania Logan & Rhett Foreman

1 Donna injured herself after landing on her pugil stick in Duel, therefore Kathy replaced her in Powerball.

=== Quarter-Final 1 ===
Original airdate: 24 June 1995
Challengers: Nellie Baker v Sabrina Hooyman, Ashley Martin v David Wallis

Female
Event	Nellie	Sabrina	Gladiators
Pyramid	10	0	Cheeta & Delta
Tilt	0	2	Flame & Cheeta
Wall	10	5	Storm & Blade
Suspension Bridge	0	0	Flame & Storm
TOTAL	20	7	

Male
Event	Ashley	David	Gladiators
Pyramid	0	0	Tower & Condor
Tilt	2	7	Tower & Vulcan
Wall	10	0	Cougar & Taipan
Suspension Bridge	0	0	Tower & Vulcan
TOTAL	12	7	

Eliminator

- Female: 6.5 second head start for Nellie
- Male: 2.5 second head start for Ashley
- Winners: Nellie Baker & David Wallis

=== Quarter-Final 2 ===
Original airdate: 1 July 1995
Challengers: Kerry Warman v Bernadette Withers, Ian Jacobs v Andrew Halliday

Female
Event	Kerry	Bernadette	Gladiators
Powerball	4	0	Blade, Delta & Flame
Duel	0	0	Flame & Storm
Hit and Run	12	10	Fury, Cheeta, Delta & Rebel
Pyramid	0	0	Cheeta & Storm
TOTAL	16	10	

Male
Event	Ian	Andrew	Gladiators
Powerball	0	8	Hammer, Taipan & Tower
Duel	5	5	Vulcan & Tower
Hit and Run	2	4	Taipan, Force, Hammer & Vulcan
Pyramid	0	10	Cougar & Condor
TOTAL	7	27	

Eliminator

- Female: 3 second head start for Kerry
- Male: 10 second head start for Andrew
- Winners: Bernadette Withers & Andrew Halliday

=== Quarter-Final 3 ===
Original airdate: 8 July 1995
Challengers: Karen Swansborough v Teresa Brett, Tony Langdon v Rod McQueen

Female
Event	Karen	Teresa	Gladiators
Wall	10	0	Storm & Delta
Atlaspheres	2	6	Rebel & Flame
Hang Tough	5	5	Delta & Cheeta
Gauntlet	10	10	Flame, Delta, Blade, Rebel & Fury
TOTAL	27	21	

Male
Event	Tony	Rod	Gladiators
Wall	0	10	Condor & Cougar
Atlaspheres	10	4	Force & Hammer
Hang Tough	0	0	Taipan & Cougar
Gauntlet	0	0	Vulcan, Taipan, Tower, Condor & Hammer
TOTAL	10	14	

Eliminator

- Female: 3 second head start for Karen
- Male: 2 second head start for Rod
- Winners: Teresa Brett & Rod McQueen

=== Quarter-Final 4 ===
Original airdate: 15 July 1995
Challengers: Tania Logan v Fernanda Lacey, Howard Arbuthnot v Rhett Foreman

Female
Event	Tania	Fernanda	Gladiators
Duel	5	5	Flame & Storm
Pyramid	0	0	Delta & Cheeta
Hit and Run	2	8	Flame, Fury, Blade & Rebel
Powerball	2	2	Cheeta, Delta & Rebel
TOTAL	9	15	

Male
Event	Howard	Rhett	Gladiators
Duel	5	0	Tower & Vulcan
Pyramid	0	0	Hammer & Condor
Hit and Run	8	8	Taipan, Tower, Cougar & Vulcan
Powerball	0	2	Cougar, Hammer & Taipan
TOTAL	13	10	

Eliminator

- Female: 3 second head start for Fernanda
- Male: 1.5 second head start for Howard
- Winners: Fernanda Lacey & Rhett Foreman

=== Semi-final 1 ===
Original airdate: 22 July 1995
Challengers: Teresa Brett v Nellie Baker, David Wallis v Rod McQueen

Female
Event	Teresa	Nellie	Gladiators
Suspension Bridge	5	0	Storm & Flame
Pyramid	0	0	Delta & Cheeta
Powerball	3	6	Cheeta, Delta & Rebel
Hang Tough	0	0	Fury & Blade
TOTAL	8	6	

Male
Event	David	Rod	Gladiators
Suspension Bridge	0	0	Tower & Vulcan
Pyramid	0	0	Condor & Hammer
Powerball	2	0	Condor, Hammer & Taipan
Hang Tough	0	0	Taipan & Cougar
TOTAL	2	0	

Eliminator

- Female: Teresa walkover in to Grand Final due to Nellie's injury.
- Male: 1 second head start for David
- Winners: Teresa Brett & David Wallis

=== Semi-final 2 ===
Original airdate: 29 July 1995
Challengers: Bernadette Withers v Fernanda Lacey, Andrew Halliday v Rhett Foreman

Female
Event	Bernadette	Fernanda	Gladiators
Duel	5	5	Storm & Flame
Wall	10	5	Blade & Storm
Tilt	0	2	Flame & Cheeta
Gauntlet	0	5	Rebel, Fury, Blade, Delta & Storm
TOTAL	15	17	

Male
Event	Andrew	Rhett	Gladiators
Duel	5	0	Tower & Vulcan
Wall	10	0	Condor & Cougar
Tilt	5	0	Tower & Taipan
Gauntlet	10	10	Vulcan, Taipan, Cougar, Condor & Hammer
TOTAL	30	10	

Eliminator

- Female: 1 second head start for Fernanda
- Male: 10 second head start for Andrew
- Winners: Bernadette Withers & Andrew Halliday

=== Grand Final ===
Original airdate: 5 August 1995
Challengers: Teresa Brett v Bernadette Withers, David Wallis v Andrew Halliday

Female
Event	Teresa	Bernadette	Gladiators
Gauntlet	10	10	Rebel, Fury, Blade, Delta & Storm
Duel	5	5	Storm & Flame
Pyramid	0	0	Delta & Cheeta
Hang Tough	0	5	Blade & Fury
TOTAL	15	20	

Male
Event	David	Andrew	Gladiators
Gauntlet	0	10	Tower, Vulcan, Cougar, Condor & Taipan
Duel	5	0	Vulcan & Tower
Pyramid	0	0	Hammer & Condor
Hang Tough	0	10	Cougar & Taipan
TOTAL	5	20	

Eliminator

- Female: 2.5 second start for Bernadette
- Male: 7.5 second start for Andrew
- Winners: Bernadette Withers & Andrew Halliday

== Cheerleaders ==
Choreographer: Davidia Lind

Cheerleaders: Cintra Bedford, Jane Crichton, Jessica Emblen, Sarah Harlow, Tamra Lind, Tamara Raup, Emma Sieber, Leigh-Anne Vizer, Francene Vedelago, Kyle Watson

== Production ==
Production began in January 1995 when the producers began their search for Gladiators and challengers. The long list was cut to 100 people who attended tryouts in Brisbane (where it was decided the show would be filmed), Melbourne and Sydney. Fourteen Gladiators and a number of challengers were selected.

The apparatus was delivered to the Brisbane Entertainment Centre in March requiring 35 trucks and 100 riggers whilst the Gladiators filmed the opening credits at Dee Why. Challengers arrived at the BEC on 16 March to begin training.

An unaired pilot episode was filmed using the Gladiators and production crew as challengers. There was no audience and Force, Rebel and Cheeta did not compete in any events.

Filming commenced on 24 March and wrapped on 2 April. Initially audiences numbered 2,000 but grew to 5,000 as filming progressed. St John's Ambulance personnel were on site during filming.

The first episode aired on Seven Network on 29 April and immediately entered the top 10 most watch shows in Australia. A second series entered production in May.
