= Gladiators (Australian TV series) series 3 =

Gladiators
- Season 3
- Starring: Kimberley Joseph; Mike Hammond
- No. of episodes: 24

Release
- Original network: Seven Network
- Original release: 13 April – 21 September 1996

Series chronology
- ← Previous; Series 2

The third series of Gladiators began airing on Seven Network on 13 April 1996.

Twenty four episodes were filmed at the Brisbane Entertainment Centre in December 1995, including three three-part specials.

The series was once again presented by Kimberley Joseph and Mike Hammond with Tony Schibeci as commentator, Mike Whitney as referee, John Forsyth as assistant referee and the Kix cheerleaders performed in the background of the events. Forsyth also acted as a stand-in referee in Quarter-finals 1 and 2 after Mike Whitney caught a stomach bug virus, and Forsyth's position as assistant referee was taken over by Neil Waldron because of this.

The third series suffered a slight decline in viewing figures and due to an increase in costs, production on the fourth series was halted until the revival in 2008.

== Gladiators ==
=== Male ===
- Commando - Geoff Barker
- Condor - Alistair Gibb
- Hammer - Mark McGaw
- Predator - Tony Forrow
- Taipan - Michael Melksham
- Tornado - Tony Latina
- Tower - Ron Reeve
- Vulcan - John Seru

Predator suffered an injury in Heat 4 and was sidelined for the rest of the series. Taipan missed a number of episodes due to a knee injury and was only able to play in non-contact games like Hang Tough, Joust and Swing Shot.

=== Female ===
- Blade - Bev Carter
- Cheeta - Nicky Davico
- Delta - Karen Alley
- Electra - Roz Forsyth
- Flame - Lynda Byrnes
- Fury - Julie Saunders
- Glacier - Lourene Bevaart
- Storm - Charlene Machin

Blade suffered an injury on Hang Tough in heat 7 when she landed on part of the arena floor not fully covered by crash mats. Whilst the fall was televised, Blade's injury was not referred to onscreen and she was sidelined until the semi-finals.

Cheeta chose to leave the show after heat 4. Due to this, reserve Gladiator, Electra was brought in though she only appeared in six episodes and never appeared in the starting credits or any publicity material. The official Australian Gladiators magazine makes no reference to her. She is married to John Forsythe, who was assistant referee, stand in referee for quarter-finals 1 and 2, and Director of training.

== Events ==
Atlaspheres, Duel, Gauntlet, Hang Tough, Hit & Run, Powerball, Pursuit, Pyramid, Swingshot, Suspension Bridge, Wall and Whiplash all returned. The layout of the Pursuit course was slightly changed for this series. Two new events were introduced, Skytrack and Joust, the latter of which had been recently axed in the UK series with the apparatus being shipped to Australia. Tilt which had only appeared once early on in the preceding series did not return.

== Shows ==
A three-part individual sports athletes challenge preluded the third domestic series. Fifteen shows were filmed in a progressive competition, followed by a further two specials at the conclusion of the domestic series.

Winning challengers are in bold.

Episode	Contest	Original airdate	Challengers (Female)	Challengers (Male)	Events
Sports Athletes Challenge
01	Sports Athletes 1	13 April 1996	Karla Gilbert Vs **Emma George**	Chris Fydler Vs **Peter Winters**	Wall, Whiplash, Swingshot, Duel
02	Sports Athletes 2	20 April 1996	**Shelley Oates** Vs Nici Andronicus	**Guy Andrews** Vs Sean Carlan	Pyramid, Atlasphere, Hang Tough, Suspension Bridge
03	Sports Athletes Final	27 April 1996	Shelley Oates Vs **Emma George**	Guy Andrews Vs **Peter Winters**	Hang Tough, Suspension Bridge, Wall, Swingshot
Domestic Series 3
04	Heat 1	4 May 1996	Allison Ferry Vs **Joanne Rogers**	**Shane Vuletich** Vs Wayne Neuendorf	Hang Tough, Powerball, Duel, Atlaspheres
05	Heat 2	11 May 1996	Liz Ruffin Vs **Marisa Huettner**	**Paul Stubbs** Vs Sam Soliman	Skytrak, Pyramid, Hang Tough, Suspension Bridge
06	Heat 3	18 May 1996	**Leanne Martin** Vs Mary Kominos	Cameron Simon Vs **Paul Reynolds**	Wall, Gauntlet, Whiplash, Swingshot
07	Heat 4	25 May 1996	**Nicki Richards** Vs Kylie Saunders	Jamie Rafanelli Vs **Phil Burgess**	Powerball^{1}, Duel, Skytrak, Hang Tough
08	Heat 5	1 June 1996	Astrid Edlinger Vs **Catherine Arlove**	**Joshua McEwen** Vs Kerry Packer	Joust, Powerball^{2}, Hit & Run, Pursuit
09	Heat 6	8 June 1996	Jacqui Drew Vs **Christine Dale**	**Jeff Prewett** Vs Gavin Wise	Gauntlet, Swingshot, Suspension Bridge, Wall
10	Heat 7	15 June 1996	Leesa Sharpe Vs **Debbie Santic**	Daniel Di Paolo Vs **James Lenehan**	Pyramid, Pursuit, Gauntlet, Hang Tough
11	Heat 8	22 June 1996	**Sandra Hansen** Vs Siobhan Skinner	Keith Hansen Vs **Peter Cranney**	Duel, Atlaspheres, Pyramid, Whiplash
12	Quarter-final 1	29 June 1996	Leanne Martin Vs **Debbie Santic**	Joshua McEwen Vs **Paul Reynolds**	Powerball, Duel, Skytrak, Gauntlet
13	Quarter-final 2	6 July 1996	**Marisa Huettner** Vs Christine Dale	**Paul Stubbs** Vs Peter Cranney	Atlaspheres, Pyramid, Hang Tough, Suspension Bridge
14	Quarter-final 3	13 July 1996	Joanne Rogers Vs **Catherine Arlove**	Phil Burgess Vs **Jeff Prewett**	Duel, Skytrak, Hit & Run, Wall
15	Quarter-final 4	20 July 1996	Nicki Richards Vs **Sandra Hansen**	**Shane Vuletich** Vs James Lenehan	Pyramid, Swingshot, Joust, Hang Tough
16	Semi-final 1	27 July 1996	Sandra Hansen Vs **Catherine Arlove**	Shane Vuletich Vs **Paul Stubbs**	Wall, Gauntlet, Skytrak, Suspension Bridge
17	Semi-final 2	3 August 1996	**Marisa Huettner** Vs Debbie Santic	Jeff Prewett Vs **Paul Reynolds**	Swingshot, Duel, Whiplash, Pyramid
18	Final	10 August 1996	Catherine Arlove^{3} ^{4} Vs **Marisa Huettner**^{4}	**Paul Reynolds**^{4} Vs Paul Stubbs ^{4}	Gauntlet, Pursuit, Pyramid, Hang Tough
Team Sports Challenge
19	Team Sports 1	17 August 1996	**Natalie Shapiro & Leigh Martyn (Softball)** Vs Kristen Towers & Julie Towers (Hockey)	**John Platten & Richard Champion (AFL)** Vs Matthew Hayden & Jimmy Maher (Cricket)	Pyramid, Skytrak, Hit & Run, Duel
20	Team Sports 2	24 August 1996	**Debbie Watson & Naomi Castle (Water Polo)** Vs Sharon Finnan & Keeley Devery (Netball)	**Graham Mackay & Jason Croker (Rugby League)** Vs Brett Smith & Michael Foley (Rugby Union)	Gauntlet, Swingshot, Atlaspheres, Hang Tough
21	Team Sports Final	31 August 1996	**Natalie Shapiro & Leigh Martyn (Softball)** Vs Debbie Watson & Naomi Castle (Water Polo)	Johnny Platten & Richard Champion (AFL) Vs **Jason Croker & Graeme Mackay (Rugby League)**	Wall, Pyramid, Hang Tough, Suspension Bridge
Army Vs Navy
22	Army Vs Navy 1	7 September 1996	Sandra Hansen & Suzie Llewellyn (Navy) Vs **Sandra-Lee Walker & Michelle Perrone (Army)**	Peter Gatti & Keith Lewis (Navy) Vs **Gavin Davis & Ritchie Gibson (Army)**	Duel, Skytrak, Gauntlet, Wall
23	Army Vs Navy 2	14 September 1996	**Jacinta Peel & Candice Cushway (Army)** Vs Donna Hunt & Tess Donellan (Navy)	Dwayne & Rick "Wombat" Morse (Army) Vs **Tim O'Brien & John Iles (Navy)**	Pyramid, Whiplash, Swingshot, Suspension Bridge
24	Army Vs Navy Final	21 September 1996	Sandra-Lee Walker & Michelle Perrone (Army A) Vs **Candice Cushway & Jacinta Peel (Army B)**	Gavin Davis & Ritchie Gibson (Army) Vs **Tim O'Brien & John Iles (Navy)**	Joust, Skytrack, Pyramid, Hang Tough

^{1}These were the lasts appearances by Cheeta and Predator.
^{2}This was the first appearance of reserve Gladiator Electra.
^{3}Catherine Arlove was injured after Hang Tough and was unable to compete in the Eliminator. Marisa Huettner had to run the eliminator by herself against the clock. She won the series as the strongest competitor holding the fastest Eliminator time recorded in any series.
^{4}All four finalists won the right to compete for Australia in the second Ashes series in Birmingham.

== Episode summary ==
=== Individual Sports Challenge ===
==== Individual Sports Challenge Heat One ====
Original airdate: 13 April 1996
Challengers: Karla Gilbert (Iron Woman) v Emma George (Pole Vaulter), Chris Fydler (Swimmer) v Peter Winters (Decathlete)

Female
Event	Karla	Emma	Gladiators
Wall	0	0	Blade & Delta
Whiplash	10	10	Fury & Flame
Swing Shot	0	5	Fury & Blade
Duel	0	5	Flame & Storm
TOTAL	10	20	

Male
Event	Chris	Peter	Gladiators
Wall	0	10	Commando & Condor
Whiplash	0	0	Tower & Vulcan
Swing Shot	7	11	Taipan & Hammer
Duel	0	0	Tower & Vulcan
TOTAL	7	21	

Eliminator

- Female: 5 second start for Emma
- Male: 7 second start for Peter
- Heat One Winners: Emma George & Peter Winters

==== Individual Sports Challenge Heat Two ====
Original airdate: 20 April 1996
Challengers: Shelley Oates (Kayaker) v Nici Andronicus (Triathlete), Guy Andrews (Iron Man) v Sean Carlan (Hammer Thrower)

Female
Event	Shelley	Nici	Gladiators
Pyramid	0	0	Delta & Fury
Atlaspheres	2	4	Cheeta & Flame
Hang Tough	0	0	Delta & Fury
Suspension Bridge	5	0	Flame & Storm
TOTAL	7	4	

Male
Event	Guy	Sean	Gladiators
Pyramid	0	0	Hammer & Condor
Atlaspheres	4	0	Tower & Hammer
Hang Tough	0	0	Taipan & Commando
Suspension Bridge	0	0	Tower & Vulcan
TOTAL	4	0	

Eliminator

- Female: 1.5 second start for Shelley
- Male: 2 second start for Guy
- Heat Two Winners: Shelley Oates & Guy Andrews

==== Individual Sports Challenge Grand Final ====
Original airdate: 27 April 1996
Challengers: Shelley Oates (Kayaker) v Emma George (Pole Vaulter), Guy Andrews (Iron Man) v Peter Winter (Decathlete)

Female
Event	Shelley	Emma	Gladiators
Hang Tough	0	5	Delta & Fury
Suspension Bridge	5	10	Flame & Storm
Wall	5	10	Storm & Delta
Swing Shot	4	8	Flame & Fury
TOTAL	14	33	

Male
Event	Guy	Peter	Gladiators
Hang Tough	0	0	Taipan & Commando
Suspension Bridge	0	0	Tower & Condor
Wall	0	10	Hammer & Condor
Swing Shot	0	3	Commando & Taipan
TOTAL	0	13	

Eliminator

- Female: 9.5 second start for Emma
- Male: 6.5 second start for Peter
- Heat Grand Winners: Emma George & Peter Winters

=== Domestic Series ===
==== Heat 1 ====
Original airdate: 4 May 1996
Challengers: Allison Ferry v Joanne Rogers, Shane Vuletich v Wayne Neuendorf

Female
Event	Joanne	Allison	Gladiators
Hang Tough	0	0	Blade & Fury
Powerball	2	0	Blade, Delta & Storm
Duel	0	0	Flame & Glacier
Atlasphere	2	0	Storm & Flame
TOTAL	4	0	

Male
Event	Shane	Wayne	Gladiators
Hang Tough	10	0	Condor & Commando
Powerball	4	0	Condor, Hammer & Vulcan
Duel	0	0	Vulcan & Tower
Atlasphere	4	2	Hammer & Commando
TOTAL	18	2	

Eliminator

- Female: 2 second head start for Joanne
- Male: 8 second head start for Shane
- Winners: Joanne Rogers & Shane Vuletich

==== Heat 2 ====
Original airdate: 11 May 1996
Challengers: Liz Ruffin v Marisa Huettner, Paul Stubbs vs Sam Soliman

Female
Event	Liz	Marisa	Gladiators
Skytrack	10 ^{1}	0	Cheeta & Storm
Pyramid	0	0	Cheeta & Delta
Hang Tough	0	5	Blade & Fury
Suspension Bridge	0	5	Glacier & Flame
TOTAL	10	10	

Male
Event	Paul	Sam	Gladiators
Skytrack	10	0	Predator & Commando
Pyramid	0	0	Hammer & Condor
Hang Tough	0	0	Commando & Condor
Suspension Bridge	0	0	Predator & Hammer
TOTAL	10	0	

Eliminator

- Female: No head start
- Male: 5 second head start for Paul
- Winners: Marisa Huettner & Paul Stubbs

^{1}Cheeta caught Liz but was disqualified by Mike Whitney for starting before the whistle.

==== Heat 3 ====
Original airdate: 18 May 1996
Challengers: Leanne Martin v Mary Kominos, Cameron Simon v Paul Reynolds

Female
Event	Leanne	Mary	Gladiators
Wall	0	10	Storm & Blade
Gauntlet	0	0	Cheeta, Delta, Glacier, Fury & Flame
Whiplash	0	0	Flame & Glacier
Swing Shot	4	1	Delta & Fury
TOTAL	4	11	

Male
Event	Cameron	Paul	Gladiators
Wall	0	0	Condor & Hammer
Gauntlet	0	0	Predator, Tornado, Condor, Vulcan & Tower
Whiplash	10	0	Condor & Predator
Swing Shot	3	3	Commando & Taipan
TOTAL	13	3	

Eliminator

- Female: 3.5 second head start for Mary
- Male: 5 second head start for Cameron
- Winners: Leanne Martin & Paul Reynolds

==== Heat 4 ====
Original airdate: 25 May 1996
Challengers: Nicki Richards v Kylie Saunders, Jamie Rafanelli v Phil Burgess

Female
Event	Nicki	Kylie	Gladiators
Powerball	6	0	Cheeta, Delta & Glacier
Skytrack	10	0	Blade & Fury
Duel	5	0	Storm & Flame
Hang Tough	0	0	Blade & Delta
TOTAL	21	0	

Male
Event	Jamie	Phil	Gladiators
Powerball	6	6	Condor, Hammer & Predator/Vulcan^{1}
Skytrack	10	0	Condor & Commando
Duel	0	10	Tower & Hammer
Hang Tough	5	0	Tornado & Commando
TOTAL	21	16	

Eliminator

- Female: 10.5 second head start for Nicki
- Male: 2.5 second head start for Jamie
- Winners: Nicki Richards & Phil Burges

^{1} Predator suffered a season-ending injury in Powerball and Vulcan was substituted in for the remainder of the game.

==== Heat 5 ====
Original airdate: 1 June 1996
Challengers: Astrid Edlinger v Catherine Arlove, Joshua McEwan v Kerry Packer

Female
Event	Astrid	Catherine	Gladiators
Joust	5	5	Flame & Glacier
Powerball	6	2	Delta, Electra & Flame
Hit & Run	2	4	Blade, Delta, Fury & Electra
Pursuit	0	0	Fury & Glacier
TOTAL	13	9	

Male
Event	Jousha	Kerry	Gladiators
Joust	5	5	Tower & Taipan
Powerball	5	0	Condor, Hammer & Vulcan
Hit and Run	10	10	Taipan, Tower, Commando & Vulcan
Pursuit	0	0	Condor & Tornado
TOTAL	20	15	

Eliminator

- Female: 2 second head start for Astrid
- Male: 2.5 second head start for Joshua
- Winners: Catherine Arlove & Joshua McEwan

==== Heat 6 ====
Original airdate: 8 June 1996
Challengers: Jacqui Drew v Christine Dale, Jeff Prewett v Gavin Wise

Female
Event	Jacqui	Christine	Gladiators
Gauntlet	0	0	Delta, Fury, Glacier, Storm & Flame
Swing Shot	4	0	Blade & Delta
Suspension Bridge	0	5	Flame & Glacier
Wall	0	0	Fury & Storm
TOTAL	4	5	

Male
Event	Jeff	Gavin	Gladiators
Gauntlet	5	0	Vulcan, Tornado, Hammer, Condor & Tower
Swing Shot	3	1	Taipan & Hammer
Suspension Bridge	5	0	Tower & Vulcan
Wall	10	0	Condor & Tornado
TOTAL	23	1	

Eliminator

- Female: 0.5 second head start for Christine
- Male: 11 second head start for Jeff
- Winners: Christine Dale & Jeff Prewett

==== Heat 7 ====
Original airdate: 15 June 1996
Challengers: Leesa Sharpe v Debbie Santic, Daniel Di Paolo v James Lenehan

Female
Event	Leesa	Debbie	Gladiators
Pyramid	0	0	Delta & Glacier
Gauntlet	0	5	Delta, Storm, Glacier, Blade & Flame
Pursuit	0	0	Fury & Storm
Hang Tough	0	0	Fury & Blade
TOTAL	0	5	

Male
Event	Daniel	James	Gladiators
Pyramid	0	0	Tower & Hammer
Gauntlet	0	0	Vulcan, Hammer, Condor, Tornado & Tower
Pursuit	0	10	Condor & Tornado
Hang Tough	10	0	Commando & Taipan
TOTAL	10	10	

Eliminator

- Female: 2.5 second head start for Debbie
- Male: no head start
- Winners: Debbie Santic & James Lenehan

==== Heat 8 ====
Original airdate: 22 June 1996
Challengers: Sandra Hansen v Siobhan Skinner, Keith Hansen v Peter Cranney

Female
Event	Sandra	Siobhan	Gladiators
Duel	0	5	Flame & Storm
Atlaspheres	0	0	Fury & Glacier
Pyramid	0	10	Storm & Delta
Whiplash	10	0	Fury & Glacier
TOTAL	10	15	

Male
Event	Keith	Peter	Gladiators
Duel	0	0	Commando & Vulcan
Atlaspheres	4	0	Condor & Tower
Pyramid	0	0	Tornado & Hammer
Whiplash	10	10	Tower & Vulcan
TOTAL	14	10	

Eliminator

- Female: 2 second head start for Keith
- Male: 2.5 second head start for Siobhan
- Winners: Sandra Hansen & Peter Cranney

==== Quarter-final 1 ====
Original airdate: 29 June 1996
Challengers: Leanne Martin v Debbie Santic, Joshua McEwan v Paul Reynolds

Female
Event	Leanne	Debbie	Gladiators
Powerball	2	6	Delta, Glacier & Storm
Duel	5	5	Flame & Glacier
Skytrack	10	0	Fury & Storm
Gauntlet	0	0	Fury, Delta, Glacier, Storm & Flame
TOTAL	17	11	

Male
Event	Joshua	Paul	Gladiators
Powerball	8	9	Hammer, Tornado & Tower
Duel	0	0	Tower & Vulcan
Skytrack	0	0	Condor & Tornado
Gauntlet	0	0	Hammer, Vulcan, Condor, Tornado & Tower
TOTAL	8	9	

Eliminator

- Female: 3 second head start for Leanne
- Male: 0.5 second head start for Paul
- Winners: Debbie Santic & Paul Reynolds

==== Quarter-final 2 ====
Original airdate: 6 July 1996
Challengers: Marisa Huettner v Christine Dale, Paul Stubbs v Peter Cranney

Female
Event	Marisa	Christine	Gladiators
Atlasphere	4	4	Flame & Storm
Pyramid	0	0	Delta & Storm
Hang Tough	0	0	Fury & Delta
Suspension Bridge	5	0	Glacier & Flame
TOTAL	9	4	

Male
Event	Paul	Peter	Gladiators
Atlasphere	0	0	Tower & Vulcan
Pyramid	0	0	Hammer & Condor
Hang Tough	10	0	Taipan & Commando
Suspension Bridge	0	0	Hammer & Vulcan
TOTAL	10	0	

Eliminator

- Female: 2.5 second head start for Christine
- Male: 5 second head start for Paul
- Winners: Marisa Huettner & Paul Stubbs

==== Quarter-final 3 ====
Original airdate: 13 July 1996
Challengers: Joanne Rogers & Catherine Arlove, Phil Burgess v Jeff Prewett

Female
Event	Joanne	Catherine	Gladiators
Duel	0	0	Glacier & Flame
Skytrack	0	10^{1}	Fury & Delta
Hit and Run	0	8	Blade, Delta, Flame, Storm
Wall	0	0	Fury & Storm
TOTAL	0	18	

Male
Event	Phil	Jeff	Gladiators
Duel	0	0	Condor & Vulcan
Skytrack	0	0	Commando & Tornado
Hit and Run	0	10	Vulcan, Taipan, Commando & Tornado
Wall	0	10	Hammer & Condor
TOTAL	0	20	

Eliminator

- Female: 9 second head start for Catherine
- Male: 10 second head start for Jeff
- Winners: Catherine Arlove & Jeff Prewett

^{1} Fury caught Joanne early but lost her footing on the track, forcing Catherine to crash in to her. Fury was taken down and Catherine re-ran her race with Delta which she won.

==== Quarter-final 4 ====
Original airdate: 20 July 1996
Challengers: Nicki Richards v Sandra Hansen, Shane Vuletich v James Lenehan

Female
Event	Nicki	Sandra	Gladiators
Pyramid	0	0	Glacier & Fury
Swing Shot	3	0	Fury & Storm
Joust	5	5	Glacier & Flame
Hang Tough	0	5	Electra & Delta
TOTAL	8	10	

Male
Event	Shane	James	Gladiators
Pyramid	0	10	Condor & Hammer
Swing Shot	9	0	Commando & Hammer
Joust	5	0	Taipan & Vulcan
Hang Tough	5	0	Tornado & Taipan
TOTAL	19	10	

Eliminator

- Female: 1 second head start for Sandra
- Male: 4.5 second head start for Shane
- Winners: Sandra Hansen & Shane Vuletich

==== Semi-final 1 ====
Original airdate: 27 July 1996
Challengers: Sandra Hansen v Catherine Arlove, Shane Vuletich v Paul Stubbs

Female
Event	Sandra	Catherine	Gladiators
Wall	0	0	Blade & Storm
Gauntlet	0	10	Delta, Storm, Glacier, Fury & Flame
Skytrack	0	0^{1}	Fury & Delta
Suspension Bridge	0	5^{2}	Flame & Glacier
TOTAL	0	15	

Male
Event	Shane	Paul	Gladiators
Wall	0	10	Condor & Hammer
Gauntlet	0	0	Hammer, Commando, Condor, Tornado & Vulcan
Skytrack	10^{3}	0	Tornado & Commando
Suspension Bridge	0	10^{4}	Vulcan & Hammer
TOTAL	10	20	

Eliminator

- Female: 7.5 second head start for Catherine
- Male: 5 second head start for Paul
- Winners: Catherine Arlove & Paul Stubbs

^{1} Despite appearing to hit Catherine's buzzer multiple times, no sparks appeared. Upon replay a malfunction was reported and Catherine received 0 points.
^{2} Catherine had legally hit Glacier off the bridge, however threw her hammerhead to the matts, and in a controversial ruling only scored five points.
^{3} Shane's detonator triggered despite Tornado not being remotely close to him, luckily he kept running the race to claim his ten points.
^{4} Hammer was disqualified for dropping his hammerhead.

==== Semi-final 2 ====
Original airdate: 3 August 1996
Challengers: Marisa Huettner v Debbie Santic, Jeff Prewett v Paul Reynolds

Female
Event	Marisa	Debbie	Gladiators
Swing Shot	3	2	Blade & Fury
Duel	5	10	Flame & Electra
Whiplash	0	0	Glacier & Flame
Pyramid	0	0	Delta & Glacier
TOTAL	8	12	

Male
Event	Jeff	Paul	Gladiators
Swing Shot	3	7	Taipan & Commando
Duel	0	0	Hammer & Vulcan
Whiplash	0	0	Condor & Vulcan
Pyramid	0	0	Condor & Hammer
TOTAL	3	7	

Eliminator

- Female: 2 second head start for Debbie
- Male: 2 second head start for Paul
- Winners: Marisa Huettner & Paul Reynolds

==== Grand Final ====
Original airdate: 10 August 1996
Challengers: Catherine Arlove v Marisa Huettner, Paul Reynolds v Paul Stubbs

Female
Event	Catherine	Marisa	Gladiators
Gauntlet	5	0	Glacier, Storm, Delta, Blade & Flame
Pursuit	10	10^{1}	Fury & Storm
Pyramid	0	0	Delta & Glacier
Hang Tough	0	5	Blade & Fury
TOTAL	15	15	

Male
Event	Paul Reynolds	Paul Stubbs	Gladiators
Gauntlet	5	0	Hammer, Condor, Commando, Vulcan & Tower
Pursuit	6^{2}	5	Condor & Tornado
Pyramid	0	0	Vulcan & Hammer
Hang Tough	0	5	Taipan & Commando
TOTAL	11	10	

Eliminator

- Female: Catherine forced to pull out of eliminator due to shoulder injury. Marisa must complete the course alone.
- Male: 0.5 second start for Paul Reynolds.
- Series 3 Winners: Marisa Huettner & Paul Reynolds

^{1} Storm was disqualified for holding and impeding Marisa's progress during the web trap
^{2} Despite crossing the line first for 10 points, Paul Reynolds' score was reduced to 6 for knocking over two cones

=== Team Sports Special ===
This was a 3-episode team event between the Australian sports teams.

==== Team Sports Special Heat One ====
Original airdate: 17 August 1996
Challengers:

- Natalie Shapiro & Leigh Martyn (Softball) v Kristen Towers & Julie Towers (Hockey)
- John Platten & Richard Champion (AFL) v Matthew Hayden & Jimmy Maher (Cricket)

Female
Event	Softball	Hockey	Gladiators
Pyramid	0	0	Glacier & Storm
Skytrack	0	0	Fury & Blade
Hit and Run	12	10	Fury, Flame, Delta & Blade
Duel	5	0	Flame & Storm
TOTAL	17	10	

Male
Event	AFL	Cricket	Gladiators
Pyramid	0	10	Hammer & Condor
Skytrack	0	0	Commando & Tornado
Hit and Run	14	14	Taipan, Tower, Vulcan & Hammer
Duel	0	0	Tower & Vulcan
TOTAL	14	24	

Eliminator

- Female: 3.5 second head start for Softball (Natalie)
- Male: 5 second start for Cricket (Jimmy)
- Winners: Softball & AFL

==== Team Sports Special: Heat Two ====
Original airdate: 24 August 1996
Challengers:

- Debbie Watson & Naomi Castle (Water Polo) v Sharon Finnan & Keeley Deverey (Netball)
- Graham Mackay & Jason Crocker (Rugby League) v Brett Smith & Michael Foley (Rugby Union)

Female
Event	Water Polo	Netball	Gladiators
Gauntlet	10	5	Fury, Delta, Glacier, Blade & Flame
Swing Shot	0	0	Fury & Storm
Atlasphere	2	0	Flame & Glacier
Hang Tough	0	0	Blade & Delta
TOTAL	12	5	

Male
Event	Rugby League	Rugby Union	Gladiators
Gauntlet	10	0	Condor, Vulcan, Hammer, Commando & Tower
Swing Shot	8	0	Taipan & Condor
Atlasphere	2	2	Tower & Vulcan
Hang Tough	5	5	Commando & Tornado
TOTAL	25	7	

Eliminator

- Female: 3.5 second head start for Water Polo (Naomi)
- Male: 9 second start for Rugby League (Graham)
- Winners: Water Polo & Rugby League

==== Team Sports Special: Final ====
Original airdate: 31 August 1996
Challengers:

- Natalie Shapiro & Leigh Martyn (Softball) v Debbie Watson & Naomi Castle (Water Polo)
- Johnny Platten & Richard Champion (AFL) v Graham Mackay & Jason Croker (Rugby League)

Female
Event	Softball	Water Polo	Gladiators
Wall	10^{1}	0	Storm & Blade
Pyramid	0	0	Glacier & Delta
Hang Tough	0	0	Fury & Delta
Suspension Bridge	0	0	Flame & Storm
TOTAL	10	0	

Male
Event	AFL	Rugby League	Gladiators
Wall	0	0	Commando & Condor
Pyramid	0	0	Tower & Condor
Hang Tough	0	0	Commando & Taipan
Suspension Bridge	0^{2}	0	Tower & Vulcan
TOTAL	0	0	

Eliminator

- Female: 5 second head start for Softball (Natalie)
- Male: No head start
- Team Sports Special Winners: Softball & Rugby League

^{1} Storm was red-carded for attacking the challenger's head while pulling from the Wall.
^{2} In an Australian Gladiators first, both Richard and Tower fell from the bridge at exactly the same time, calling for a re-match.

=== Army vs Navy ===
This was a 3-episode team event between the Australian Army and Australian Navy.

==== Army vs Navy Heat One ====
Original airdate: 7 September 1996
Challengers:

- Sandra Hansen & Suzie Llewellyn (Navy) Vs Sandra-Lee Walker & Michelle Perrone (Army)
- Peter Gatti & Keith Lewis (Navy) Vs Gavin Davis & Ritchie Gibson (Army)

Female
Event	Navy	Army	Gladiators
Duel	0	0	Glacier & Flame
Skytrack	0	0	Delta & Storm
Gauntlet	0	0	Fury, Glacier, Electra, Blade & Flame
Wall	0	0	Delta & Blade
TOTAL	0	0	

Male
Event	Navy	Army	Gladiators
Duel	0	0	Vulcan & Condor
Skytrack	0	0	Tornado & Commando
Gauntlet	0	0	Hammer, Commando, Vulcan, Condor & Tower
Wall	0	0	Condor & Hammer
TOTAL	0	0	

Eliminator

- Female No head start
- Male: No head start
- Winners: Army won both Eliminators

==== Army vs Navy Heat Two ====
Original airdate: 14 September 1996
Challengers:

- Tess Donellan & Donna Hunt (Navy) Vs Candice Cushway & Jacinta Peel (Army)
- Tim O'Brien & Jon Iles (Navy) Vs Dwaine Stevenson & Rick Morse (Army)

Female
Event	Navy	Army	Gladiators
Pyramid	0	0	Electra & Fury
Whiplash	0	0	Electra & Glacier
Swing Shot	1	3	Flame & Fury
Suspension Bridge	0	0	Glacier & Flame
TOTAL	1	3	

Male
Event	Navy	Army	Gladiators
Pyramid	0	0	Tornado & Condor
Whiplash	0	0	Vulcan & Tower
Swing Shot	2	3	Commando & Taipan
Suspension Bridge	0	0	Condor & Vulcan
TOTAL	2	3	

Eliminator

- Female 1 second head start for Army
- Male: 0.5 second head start for Army
- Winners: Army won women's Eliminator, Navy won men's Eliminator

==== Army vs Navy Final ====
Original airdate: 21 September 1996
Challengers:

- Sandra-Lee Walker & Michelle Perrone (Army A) Vs Candice Cushway & Jacinta Peel (Army B)
- Gavin Davis & Ritchie Gibson (Army) Vs Tim O'Brien & John Iles (Navy)

Female
Event	Army A	Army B	Gladiators
Joust	5	5	Flame & Glacier
Skytrack	0	0	Fury & Storm
Pyramid	0	0	Glacier & Storm
Hang Tough	0	0	Fury & Delta
TOTAL	5	5	

Male
Event	Army	Navy	Gladiators
Joust	5	0	Taipan & Vulcan
Skytrack	0	10	Tornado & Commando
Pyramid	0	0	Condor & Tower
Hang Tough	0	0	Taipan & Commando
TOTAL	5	10	

Eliminator

- Female No head start
- Male: 2.5 second head start for Navy
- Winners: Army B won women's Eliminator, Navy won men's Eliminator.

== Cheerleaders ==
Choreographers: Davidia Lind, Simon Lind

Cheerleaders: Cintra Bedford, Jane Crichton, Jessica Emblen, Sarah Harlow, Tamra Lind, Tamara Raup, Emma Sieber, Leigh-Anne Vizer, Francene Vedelago, Kyle Watson

== Production ==
Production began in October 1995 following the success of series two. Recording dates were pencilled in for 11–22 December at the Brisbane Entertainment Centre.

The Gladiators were given their specialist training schedules in October and took a break from promotional activities in November whilst the production crew started work on the new events.

Filming began in December and continued through into the new year. Seating in the Brisbane Entertainment Centre was increased to 8,000 and the arena itself had some subtle changes with darker lighting and an increased use of spotlights similar to the UK arena at the National Indoor Arena. The Arena floor was also changed to a black floor with lights, just like the UK.

A fourth series went into pre production. Pendulum, a UK event seen in the International series was to be introduced and there were events being developed that would be unique to the Australian series.

However, due to injuries, rising production costs and a slight decline in viewing figures, Channel 7 opted not to go ahead with a fourth series and after being on television for an almost constant eighteen months, Gladiators was over until its revival in 2008.
