= Neli =

Neli may refer to:

== Given name ==
- Neli A'asa (born 1988), American football player
- Neli Boteva (born 1974), Bulgarian badminton player
- Neli Irman (born 1986), Slovenian handball player
- Neli Marinova (born 1971), Bulgarian volleyball player
- Neli Lifuka (born 1909), Tuvaluan marine engineer and magistrate on Vaitupu
- Neli Kodrič (born 1964), Slovenian children's writer
- Neli Zafirova (born 1976), Bulgarian sprint canoer

== Other uses ==
- Coleophora neli, is a moth of the family Coleophoridae
- Colophon neli, is a species of beetle in family Lucanidae

== See also ==
- Nelli (disambiguation)
