= Nelli =

Nelli is a feminine given name and a surname. It may refer to:

== Given name ==
- Nelli Abramova (born 1940), Jewish former Soviet competitive female
- Nelli Chervotkina (born 1965), former pair skater for the Soviet Union
- Cornelli Nelli Cooman (born 1964), former Dutch athlete of Surinamese origin
- Nelli Korovkina (born 1989), Russian footballer
- Nelli Korbukova, Soviet female sprint canoer
- Nelli Laitinen (born 2002), Finnish ice hockey player
- Nelli Neumann (1886–1942), German mathematician who worked in synthetic geometry
- Nelli Shkolnikova (1928–2010), Russian Jewish classical violinist
- Nelli Tarakanova (born 1954), Ukrainian rower and medalist
- Nelli Uvarova (born 1980), Russian theater and film actress
- Nelli Voronkova (born 1972), Belarusian hurdler
- Nelli Zhiganshina (born 1987), Russian-born German ice dancer

== Surname ==
=== Pre-modern era ===
- Fabio Nelli (1533–?), Spanish banker
- Francesco Nelli (fl. 1363), Italian secretary of bishop Angelo Acciaioli and friend of Francesco Petrarca
- Ottaviano Nelli (1375–1444), Italian painter
- Pietro Nelli (1672–after 1730), Italian painter of the late Baroque period
- Plautilla Nelli (1524–1588), the first-known female Renaissance painter of Florence

=== Modern era ===
- Alessandro Nelli (1842–?), Italian founder of the Fonderia Nelli, active in Rome
- Carlos Nelli (1902–1994), Brazilian athlete
- Gabriele Nelli (born 1993), Italian male volleyball player
- Herva Nelli (1909–1994), Italian-American operatic soprano
- Renat Nelli (1906–1982), French-born leading Occitan author
- Victor Nelli Jr., American television director and producer

== See also ==
- Nelly (disambiguation), also lists entries for Nellie
- Nelliy Yefremova (1962–2019), Soviet sprint canoer
- Neli (disambiguation)
