= Richard Champion (footballer) =

Australian rules footballer, born 1968

Personal information
- Full name: Richard Champion
- Born: 14 April 1968 (age 58)
- Original team: Woodville (SANFL)
- Draft: No. 30, 1988 national draft
- Height: 186 cm (6 ft 1 in)
- Weight: 94 kg (207 lb)

Playing career^{1}
Years	Club	Games (Goals)
1991–1996	Brisbane Bears	119 (37)
1997–2000	Brisbane Lions	64 (43)
Total		183 (80)
- ^{1} Playing statistics correct to the end of 2000.

Richard Champion (born 14 April 1968 on Yorke Peninsula in Kadina, South Australia) is a former Australian rules footballer in the Australian Football League (AFL) and South Australian National Football Leagues (SANFL).

Originally from SANFL club Woodville, Champion was a high draft pick by the Brisbane Bears in 1988 VFL Draft, but he did not move to Brisbane until the 1991 AFL season.

When the club moved from Carrara on the Gold Coast, growing their fanbase, Champion became a cult figure. He was endeared by Bears fans, was Best Clubman several times, and became a local celebrity with his Jimmy Barnes impressions. He was a media figure for the club. He even appeared with John Platten to represent the AFL on the television show Gladiators.

When it became apparent that the Bears would make the finals for the first time in 1995, Champion openly wept, a sign of his endurance as a player through tough times.

Champion competed in the Gladiator Team Sports Challenge in 1995.

In 1997 he was a member of the inaugural Brisbane Lions team following the Bears rebranding.

He retired at the end of the 2000 AFL season after 183 AFL games.

== Post-football career ==
Champion is currently a television presenter and radio commentator in Brisbane and a local celebrity. He has presented TV’s The Great South East, the Lotto draw, and commentates the AFL for Triple M. In 2006, he appeared in the television show It Takes Two, where he was mentored by Wendy Matthews.

In additional to multiple singing performances on The Footy Show, Champion went on to front the classic rock supergroup The Filthy Animals after it was formed in 2021 during the COVID-19 pandemic. The band usually plays cover songs at corporate gigs; the band often features, among many others, Kerry Jacobson (Dragon, Mondo Rock, Ian Moss), Brett Williams (The Choirboys), and Glen Muirhead (Eurogliders, James Reyne Band).
