= Hluchý =

Hluchý (Czech feminine: Hluchá) is a surname. Notable people with the surname include:

- Kateřina Hluchá (born 1975), Czech sprint canoer
- Milan Hluchý (born 1985), Czech ice hockey player
