= Zabirova =

Zabirova is a surname. Notable people with the surname include:

- Tolkyn Zabirova (born 1970), Kazakhstani female singer
- Zulfiya Zabirova (born 1973), Russian cycle racer

== See also ==
- Zafirova
