= Nossiter =

Nossiter is a surname of English origin.

Notable bearers of the name include:

- Anthony Nossiter (born 1973), Australian sailor
- Bernard Nossiter (1926–1992), American journalist; father of Jonathan (see below)
- Clarence Frank Nossiter (1912 -1993), British engineer
- Dorrie Nossiter (1893–1977), British jewelry designer
- Jonathan Nossiter (born 1961), American film director
- Maria Isabella Nossiter (1735–1759), English actress
- Thomas Nossiter (1937–2004), L.S.E professor
- Yanda Nossiter (born 1976), Australian sprint canoeist
