= Kateřina Heková =

Czech canoeist (born 1976)

Kateřina Heková (born May 18, 1976 in Hradec Králové) is a Czech sprint canoer who competed in the mid-1990s. She was eliminated in the semifinals of the K-4 500 m event at the 1996 Summer Olympics in Atlanta.
