= Sandra Rojas =

Mexican canoeist (born 1973)

Personal information
- Born: October 20, 1973 (age 53)

Sport
- Sport: Canoeing
Medal record
Representing Mexico
Pan American Games
Bronze medal – third place	1995 Mar del Plata	K-2 500m
Central American and Caribbean Games
Silver medal – second place	1993 Ponce	K-2 500m
Silver medal – second place	1993 Ponce	K-4 200m
Silver medal – second place	1993 Ponce	K-4 500m

Sandra Rojas Gutiérrez (born October 20, 1973) is a Mexican sprint canoer who competed in the mid-1990s. At the 1996 Summer Olympics in Atlanta, she was eliminated in the semifinals of both the K-2 500 m and the K-4 500 m events.
