= Lia Rousset =

American canoeist

Lia Rousset (born October 5, 1977, in Alhambra, California) is an American sprint canoer who competed in the mid-1990s. At the 1996 Summer Olympics in Atlanta, she was eliminated in the semifinals of both the K-2 500 m and the K-4 500 m events.
