= Tatyana Tishchenko =

Russian canoeist

Medal record

Women's canoe sprint

World Championships
Silver medal – second place	1999 Milan	K-4 200 m
Bronze medal – third place	1995 Duisburg	K-2 200 m
Bronze medal – third place	1998 Szeged	K-4 200 m

Tatyana Tischenko (born January 1, 1975) is a Russian sprint canoer who competed in the late 1990s. She won three medals at the ICF Canoe Sprint World Championships with a silver (K-4 200 m: 1999) and two bronzes (K-2 200 m: 1995, K-4 200 m: 1998).

Tischenko also finished seventh in the K-4 500 m event at the 1996 Summer Olympics in Atlanta.
