= Marie-Josée Gilbeau-Ouimet =

Canadian sprint kayaker (born 1972)

Medal record

Women's canoe sprint

World Championships
Gold medal – first place	1995 Duisburg	K-2 200 m
Gold medal – first place	1995 Duisburg	K-4 200 m
Gold medal – first place	1998 Szeged	K-2 200 m
Silver medal – second place	1997 Dartmouth	K-4 200 m

Marie-Josée Gibeau-Ouimet (born November 2, 1972, in Lachine, Quebec) is a Canadian sprint kayaker who competed from the early 1990s to the early 2000s (decade). She won four medals at the ICF Canoe Sprint World Championships with three golds (K-2 200 m: 1995, 1998; K-4 200 m: 1995) and a silver (K-4 200 m: 1997).

Gibeau-Ouimet also competed in two Summer Olympics, earning best finish of fifth on two occasions (K-2 500 m, K-4 500 m: both 1996).
