= Larissa Kosorukova =

Russian-born Israeli sprint canoer (born 1973)

Medal record

Women's canoe sprint

World Championships
Bronze medal – third place	1995 Duisburg	K-2 200 m
Bronze medal – third place	1998 Szeged	K-4 200 m
Bronze medal – third place	2002 Seville	K-2 1000 m

Larissa Kosorukova-Pesyakhovich (Russian: Лариса Косорукова-Песяхович, Hebrew: לריסה קוסורוקובה-פסחוביץ'; born May 30, 1973) is a Russian-born Israeli sprint canoer who competed from the mid-1990s to the mid-2000s (decade). She won three bronze medals at the ICF Canoe Sprint World Championships, earning them in 1995 (K-2 200 m for Russia under her maiden name of Kosorukova), 1998 (K-4 200 m for Russia under her married name of Pesyakhovich), and 2002 (K-2 1000 m for Israel under her married name).

Kosorukova-Pesyakhovich also competed in three Summer Olympics. Competing for Russia at the 1996 Games in Atlanta, she finished seventh in the K-4 500 m and eighth in the K-2 500 m. Four years later in Sydney, Kosorukova-Pesyakhovich competed for Israel in the K-2 500 m event, but was eliminated in the semifinals. She closed out her Olympic career at the 2004 Games in Athens with her best overall finish of sixth in the K-1 500 m event.

Kosorukova-Pesyakhovich moved to Israel following the 1998 ICF Canoe Sprint World Championships in Szeged.
