= Canoeing at the 1996 Summer Olympics – Women's K-4 500 metres =

Women's K-4 500 metres at the Games of the XXVI Olympiad
- Venue: Lake Lanier
- Dates: 30 July 1996 (heats); 1 August 1996 (semifinals); 3 August 1996 (final)
- Competitors: 16 boats from 16 nations
- Winning time: 1:31.077

Medalists
1st place, gold medalist(s)		Ramona Portwich; Manuela Mucke; Birgit Fischer; Anett Schuck	Germany
2nd place, silver medalist(s)		Daniela Baumer; Sabine Eichenberger; Ingrid Haralamow; Gabi Müller	Switzerland
3rd place, bronze medalist(s)		Agneta Andersson; Ingela Ericsson; Anna Olsson; Susanne Rosenqvist	Sweden

The women's K-4 500 metres event was a fours kayaking event conducted as part of the Canoeing at the 1996 Summer Olympics program.

== Medalists ==
Gold	Silver	Bronze
Germany; Anett Schuck; Birgit Fischer; Manuela Mucke; Ramona Portwich	Switzerland; Gabi Müller; Ingrid Haralamow; Sabine Eichenberger; Daniela Baumer	Sweden; Susanne Rosenqvist; Anna Olsson; Ingela Ericsson; Agneta Andersson

== Results ==
=== Heats ===
16 crews entered in two heats. The top two finishers from each of the heats advanced directly to the finals while the remaining teams were relegated to the semifinals.

Heat 1
1.	Xian Bangdi, Gao Beibei, Dong Ying, and Zhang Qin (CHN)	1:40.045	QF
2.	Ingrid Haralamow, Daniela Baumer, Sabine Eichenberger, and Gabi Müller (SUI)	1:40.197	QF
3.	Shelley Oates, Yanda Nossiter, Lynda Lehmann, and Natalie Hunter (AUS)	1:41.185	QS
4.	Sanda Toma, Viorica Iordache, Raluca Ioniţǎ, and Mihaela Bene (ROU)	1:41.685	QS
5.	Szilvia Mednyánski, Éva Dónusz, Kinga Czigány, and Erika Mészáros (HUN)	1:42.821	QS
6.	Hanna Balabanova, Nataliya Feklisova, Tetyana Teklyan, and Kateryna Yurchenko (UKR)	1:43.381	QS
7.	Tatyana Levina, Inna Isakova, Irina Lyalina, and Yelena Lebedeva (UZB)	1:45.905	QS
8.	Sayuri Maruyama, Keiko Muto, Asako Watanabe, and Natsuki Nishi (JPN)	1:49.505	QS
Heat 2
1.	Ramona Portwich, Birgit Fischer, Anett Schuck, and Manuela Mucke (GER)	1:37.895	QF
2.	Agneta Andersson, Ingela Ericsson, Anna Olsson, and Susanne Rosenqvist (SWE)	1:39.363	QF
3.	Marie-Josée Gibeau, Alison Herst, Corrina Kennedy, and Klari MacAskill (CAN)	1:39.691	QS
4.	Izaksun Aramburu, Beatriz Manchón, Ana María Penas, and Belén Sánchez (ESP)	1:39.863	QS
5.	Olga Tishchenko, Tatyana Tishchenko, Larisa Kosorukova, and Nataliya Guly (RUS)	1:41.695	QS
6.	Alexandra Harbold, DeAnne Hemmens, Lia Rousset, and Druella Van Hengel (USA)	1:43.311	QS
7.	Jitka Janáčková, Kateřina Heková, Kateřina Hluchá, and Milena Pergnerová (CZE)	1:44.707	QS
8.	Erika Duron, Renata Hernández, Sandra Rojas, and Itzel Reza (MEX)	1:45.215	QS

=== Semifinals ===
The top two finishers in each of the semifinals and the fastest third-place finisher advanced to the final.

Semifinal 1
1.	Marie-Josée Gibeau, Alison Herst, Corrina Kennedy, and Klari MacAskill (CAN)	1:38.712	QF
2.	Olga Tishchenko, Tatyana Tishchenko, Larisa Kosorukova, and Nataliya Guly (RUS)	1:39.764	QF
3.	Sanda Toma, Viorica Iordache, Raluca Ioniţǎ, and Mihaela Bene (ROU)	1:40.088
4.	Hanna Balabanova, Nataliya Feklisova, Tetyana Teklyan, and Kateryna Yurchenko (UKR)	1:40.092
5.	Jitka Janáčková, Kateřina Heková, Kateřina Hluchá, and Milena Pergnerová (CZE)	1:42.216
6.	Sayuri Maruyama, Keiko Muto, Asako Watanabe, and Natsuki Nishi (JPN)	1:45.996
Semifinal 2
1.	Szilvia Mednyánski, Éva Dónusz, Kinga Czigány, and Erika Mészáros (HUN)	1:37.145	QF
2.	Izaksun Aramburu, Beatriz Manchón, Ana María Penas, and Belén Sánchez (ESP)	1:37.365	QF
3.	Shelley Oates, Yanda Nossiter, Lynda Lehmann, and Natalie Hunter (AUS)	1:37.905	QF
4.	Alexandra Harbold, DeAnne Hemmens, Lia Rousset, and Druella Van Hengel (USA)	1:40.045
5.	Tatyana Levina, Inna Isakova, Irina Lyalina, and Yelena Lebedeva (UZB)	1:40.893
6.	Erika Duron, Renata Hernández, Sandra Rojas, and Itzel Reza (MEX)	1:42.157

=== Final ===
The final was held on August 3.

Gold	Ramona Portwich, Birgit Fischer, Anett Schuck, and Manuela Mucke (GER)	1:31.077
Silver	Ingrid Haralamow, Daniela Baumer, Sabine Eichenberger, and Gabi Müller (SUI)	1:32.701
Bronze	Agneta Andersson, Ingela Ericsson, Anna Olsson, and Susanne Rosenqvist (SWE)	1:32.917
4.	Xian Bangdi, Gao Beibei, Dong Ying, and Zhang Qin (CHN)	1:33.089
5.	Marie-Josée Gibeau, Alison Herst, Corrina Kennedy, and Klari MacAskill (CAN)	1:33.093
6.	Izaksun Aramburu, Beatriz Manchón, Ana María Penas, and Belén Sánchez (ESP)	1:33.577
7.	Olga Tishchenko, Tatyana Tishchenko, Larisa Kosorukova, and Nataliya Guly (RUS)	1:34.345
8.	Shelley Oates, Yanda Nossiter, Lynda Lehmann, and Natalie Hunter (AUS)	1:34.673
9.	Szilvia Mednyánski, Éva Dónusz, Kinga Czigány, and Erika Mészáros (HUN)	1:34.693

Fischer became the first woman in any sport to win Olympic gold medals 16 years apart. She won the women's K-1 500 m event at the 1980 Summer Olympics in Moscow.
