= Zafirov =

Zafirov (Bulgarian: Зафиров, Macedonian: Зафиров) or female version Zafirova (Bulgarian: Зафирова, Macedonian: Зафирова) is a Slavic surname. Notable people with the surname include:

- Adalbert Zafirov (born 1969), Bulgarian footballer
- Dalia Zafirova (born 1991), Bulgarian tennis player
- Erika Zafirova (born 1999), Bulgarian rhythmic gymnast
- Ivan Zafirov (1947–2025), Bulgarian footballer
- Krasimir Zafirov (born 1950), Bulgarian footballer
- Martin Zafirov (born 1973), Bulgarian association football player
- Neli Zafirova (born 1976), Bulgarian sprint canoer
- Vladimir Zafirov (born 1983), Bulgarian footballer
