= Natsuki Nishi =

Japanese sprint canoer (born 1972)

Natsuki Nishi (西夏樹, Nishi Natsuki, born 4 June 1972) is a Japanese sprint canoer who competed in the mid-1990s. She was eliminated in the semifinals of the K-4 500 m event at the 1996 Summer Olympics in Atlanta.
