= Pavlína Jobánková =

Czech sprint canoer (born 1973)

Pavlína Jobánková (born 3 December 1973 in Nymburk) is a Czech sprint canoer. At the 1992 Summer Olympics in Barcelona for Czechoslovakia, she was eliminated in the semifinals of both the K-2 500 m and the K-4 500 m events. Four years later in Atlanta for the Czech Republic, Jobánková was eliminated in the repechages of the K-1 500 m event and the semifinals of the K-2 500 m event.
