= Helen Gilby =

British canoeist (born 1974)

Helen Gilby (born 18 June 1974) is a British canoe sprinter and marathon canoeist who competed in the mid-1990s.

== Early life ==
She came from Shepperton, taking part in the Guides. She trained with Elmbridge Canoe Club. Later she lived with Weybridge in the late 1990s.

== Career ==
At the 1996 Summer Olympics in Atlanta, she was eliminated in the semifinals of the K-2 500 m event.
