= Milena Pergnerová =

Czech sprint canoer (born 1975)

Milena Pergnerová (born 29 July 1975) is a Czech sprint canoer who competed in the mid-1990s. She was eliminated in the semifinals of the K-4 500 m event at the 1996 Summer Olympics in Atlanta.
