= Yelena Lebedeva =

Uzbekistani canoeist (born 1977)

Yelena Lebedeva (born November 13, 1977) is an Uzbekistani sprint canoer who competed in the mid-1990s. She was eliminated in the semifinals of the K-4 500 m event at the 1996 Summer Olympics in Atlanta.
