= Renata Hernández =

Mexican canoeist (born 1974)

Personal information
- Born: November 2, 1974 (age 52)

Sport
- Sport: Canoeing
Medal record
Representing Mexico
Pan American Games
Bronze medal – third place	1995 Mar del Plata	K-2 500m

Renata Hernández (born November 2, 1974) is a Mexican sprint canoer who competed in the mid-1990s. At the 1996 Summer Olympics in Atlanta, she was eliminated in the semifinals of both the K-2 500 m and the K-4 500 m events.
