= Hu Dongmei =

Chinese canoeist

Personal information
- Native name: 胡冬梅
- Nationality: Chinese
- Born: 23 December 1971 (age 54) Zhangye, Gansu
- Height: 1.76 m (5 ft 9 in)
- Weight: 73 kg (161 lb)

Sport
- Country: China
- Sport: female sprint canoeist
- Retired: yes
Medal record
Women's canoe sprint
Representing China
Asian Games
Gold medal – first place	1994 Hiroshima	K-4 500 m

Hu Dongmei
- Traditional Chinese: 胡冬梅
- Simplified Chinese: 胡冬梅
Transcriptions
Standard Mandarin
- Hanyu Pinyin: hú dōng méi

Hu Dongmei (Chinese: 胡冬梅; pinyin: hú dōng méi; born 23 December 1971 in Zhangye, Gansu) is a Chinese canoe sprinter who competed in the mid-1990s. At the 1996 Summer Olympics in Atlanta, she was eliminated in the semifinals of the K-2 500 m event.
