= Jitka Janáčková =

Czech sprint canoer (born 1973)

Jitka Janáčková (born 22 May 1973 in Mladá Boleslav) is a Czech sprint canoeist who competed in the early to mid-1990s. At the 1992 Summer Olympics in Barcelona for Czechoslovakia, she was eliminated in the semifinals of both the K-2 500 m and the K-4 500 m events. Four years later in Atlanta for the Czech Republic, Janáčková was eliminated in the semifinals of both the K-2 500 m and the K-4 500 m events.

Her daughter, Tereza Valentová, is a professional tennis player.
