= Zhang Qin =

Chinese canoeist

Personal information
- Native name: 張琴
- Born: 27 February 1974 (age 52)
- Height: 173 cm (5 ft 8 in)
- Weight: 73 kg (161 lb)
Medal record
Women's canoe sprint
Representing China
World Championships
Silver medal – second place	1995 Duisburg	K-4 500 m
Asian Games
Gold medal – first place	1994 Hiroshima	K-4 500 m

Zhang Qin (Chinese: 張琴, born 27 February 1974) is a Chinese canoe sprinter. Competing in the mid-1990s, she won a silver medal in the K-4 500 m event at the 1995 ICF Canoe Sprint World Championships in Duisburg.

Zhang also finished fourth in the K-4 500 m event at the 1996 Summer Olympics in Atlanta.
