= Lynda Lehmann =

Australian sprint canoeist (born 1958)

Lynda Lehmann (born 14 November 1958) is an Australian sprint canoeist who competed in the early to mid-1990s. Competing in two Summer Olympics, she earned her best finish of eighth in the K-4 500 m event twice (1992, 1996).
