= Asako Watanabe =

Japanese canoeist

Personal information
- Born: December 5, 1959 (age 66) Hyogo, Japan
- Height: 167 cm (5 ft 6 in)
- Weight: 63 kg (139 lb)
Medal record
Women's canoe sprint
Representing Japan
Asian Games
Bronze medal – third place	1994 Hiroshima	K-4 500 m

Asako Watanabe (渡辺 麻子, Watanabe Asako) (born December 5, 1959) is a Japanese sprint canoer who competed in the mid-1990s. At the 1996 Summer Olympics in Atlanta, she was eliminated in the repechages of the K-2 500 m event and the semifinals of the K-4 500 m event.
