= Chieko Akagi =

Japanese sprint canoer (born 1966)

Personal information
- Born: 16 December 1966 (age 59) Gunma, Japan
- Height: 165 cm (5 ft 5 in)
- Weight: 59 kg (130 lb)
Medal record
Women's canoe sprint
Representing Japan
Asian Games
| Bronze medal – third place | 1990 Beijing | K-4 500 m |
| Bronze medal – third place | 1994 Hiroshima | K-4 500 m |

Chieko Akagi (赤城 千恵子; born 16 December 1966) is a Japanese sprint canoer who competed in the mid-1990s. At the 1996 Summer Olympics in Atlanta, she was eliminated in the repêchages of the K-2 500 m event.
