= Kateryna Yurchenko =

Ukrainian sprint canoer (born 1976)

Kateryna Yurchenko (Ukrainian: Катерина Юрченко) (born August 19, 1976) is a Ukrainian sprint canoer who competed in the mid-1990s. At the 1996 Summer Olympics in Atlanta, she was eliminated in the semifinals of both the K-2 500 m and the K-4 500 m event.

Yurchenko's father, Vasyl, won two Olympic medals in canoeing in the late 1970s and early 1980s.
