= Xian Bangdi =

Chinese canoeist

Personal information
- Native name: 冼傍娣
- Born: 11 August 1976 (age 50)
- Height: 172 cm (5 ft 8 in)
- Weight: 71 kg (157 lb)
Medal record
Women's canoe sprint
Representing China
World Championships
Silver medal – second place	1995 Duisburg	K-4 500 m
Asian Games
Gold medal – first place	1994 Hiroshima	K-4 500 m

Xian Bangdi (Chinese: 冼傍娣, born 11 August 1976) is a Chinese canoe sprinter who competed in the mid-1990s. She won a silver medal in the K-4 500 m event at the 1995 ICF Canoe Sprint World Championships in Duisburg, Germany.

Xian also finished fourth in the K-4 500 m event at the 1996 Summer Olympics in Atlanta.
