= Shelley Oates-Wilding =

Australian canoeist (born 1965)

Shelley Oates-Wilding (born 4 July 1965) is an Australian sprint canoeist and waterman who competed for Australia in canoeing from 1989 to 2008. Competing in two Summer Olympics, she earned her best finish of eighth in the K-4 500 m event at Atlanta in 1996.

She held an Australian Institute of Sport netball scholarship from 1984 to 1988. A serious knee injury resulted in her taking up canoeing. She held an AIS sprint canoeing scholarship in 1990–1996.

She won the World Championships Surf Ski (Surf Life Saving) in Japan in 1992 and went on to win several Outrigger World Championships in Hawaii (Na Wahine O Ke Kai) with Offshore (Cal), Riggeroos (Aus), and Team Bradley (Hawaii).

Oates also competed in the Gladiator Individual Sports Athletes Challenge in 1995.

She currently resides in Hawaii as the president of Ikaika Hawaii Watermans Academy, a non profit organization aimed at educating youths in Ocean Safety and Stewardship as well as providing trained coaching of water activities in the ocean.
