= Natalie Hunter (canoeist) =

Australian canoeist (born 1967)

Natalie Hunter (born 13 February 1967) is an Australian sprint canoeist who competed in the mid-1990s. She finished eighth in the K-4 500 m event at the 1996 Summer Olympics in Atlanta.
