= Séverine Loyau =

French canoeist (born 1973)

Séverine Loyau (born 6 December 1973 in Nevers) is a French sprint canoeist who competed in the mid-1990s. At the 1996 Summer Olympics in Atlanta, she finished ninth in the K-2 500 m event.
