= Yanda Nossiter =

Australian sprint canoeist (born 1976)

Yanda Nossiter (born 24 October 1976) is an Australian sprint canoeist who competed from the mid-1990s to the early 2000s (decade). Competing in two Summer Olympics, she earned her best finish of eighth in the K-4 500 m event at Atlanta in 1996.
