= Nelly (disambiguation) =

Nelly (born 1974) is an American rapper, singer, actor and entrepreneur.

Nelly or Nellie may also refer to:

== Places ==
- Nellie, Ohio, an American village
- Nellie, Assam, a town in Nagaon district
- Nelly Island, Antarctica
- Nelly Island, Bermuda
- Mount Nelly, Bolivia, a stratovolcano in the Andes

== People ==
- Nelly (given name), a list of people with the given name or nickname Nelly or Nellie
- Nelly (Egyptian entertainer), Egyptian singer, actor, and radio and television personality and presenter Nelly Artin Kalfayan (born 1951)
- Nelly's, Greek photographer Elli Souyioultzoglou-Seraïdari (1899–1998)
- Harry Nelly (1878–1928), head coach of the Army college football program from 1908 to 1910

== Arts and entertainment ==
- Nelly (2004 film), a French film
- Nelly (2016 film), a Canadian film
- Nellie, a boat in Joseph Conrad's novella Heart of Darkness

== Other uses ==
- SS Nelly, a Danish steamship in service between 1928 and 1936
- "Nellie", a prototype of Cultivator No. 6, a massive tank that could dig itself into the ground
- Nelly, a nickname for the Giant Petrel, a large seabird
- "Nelly" or "swish", a slang term for effeminate behaviour and interests in gay male communities
- "Nellie", nickname of the Denison, Bonham and New Orleans Railroad, a North Texas shortline
