= Gabi Müller =

Swiss sprint canoer (born 1974)

Olympic medal record

Women's canoe sprint
Silver medal – second place	1996 Atlanta	K-4 500 m

Gabriela Müller (born 21 November 1974) is a Swiss sprint canoer who competed in the mid-1990s. She won a silver medal in the K-4 500 m event at the 1996 Summer Olympics in Atlanta.
