= Sandrine Paquier =

Swiss swimmer

Personal information
- Born: 28 February 1977 (age 49)

Sport
- Sport: Swimming

Sandrine Paquier (born 28 February 1977) is a Swiss freestyle swimmer. She competed in three events at the 1996 Summer Olympics.
