= Gladiators (1995 Australian TV series) =

- Genre: Sports entertainment
- Created by: Dan Carr; John Ferraro
- Developed by: MGM Television
- Directed by: Timothy Kupsch
- Presented by: Kimberley Joseph (series 1–3); Aaron Pedersen (series 1); Mike Hammond (series 2–3)
- Starring: John Alexander (series 1); Mike Whitney (series 2-3); John Forsyth (series 1-3); Neil Waldron (series 2-3); Andrew Halliday (series 3 Quarter Finals 1-2 as referee)
- Announcer: Tony Schibeci
- Theme music composer: Cameron Tait; Marty Irwin; Noel MacDonald
- Country of origin: Australia
- Original language: English
- No. of series: 3
- No. of episodes: 70 (3 unaired)

Production
- Executive producers: Patrick Condon; Des Monaghan
- Producers: Bill Edmonds; Roger Kirk
- Production locations: Brisbane Entertainment Centre, Queensland
- Camera setup: Multiple-camera setup
- Running time: 60 minutes (inc. adverts)

Original release
- Network: Seven Network in association with The Samuel Goldwyn Company
- Release: 29 April 1995 – 12 October 1996

Related
- Gladiators (2008); Gladiators (2024)

Gladiators is an Australian television series which aired on Saturday nights on the Seven Network from 29 April 1995 until 12 October 1996 almost consecutively for eighteen months. It was based on the franchise of the same name, which started with American Gladiators in 1989. However the Australian show was more heavily based on the British version of the 1990s with events, format and even music being used from that show.

All three series of the show were filmed at the Brisbane Entertainment Centre in 1995, and was hosted by Kimberley Joseph and Aaron Pedersen, with Mike Hammond replacing Pedersen after the first series. The show was refereed by John Alexander in the first series, and Mike Whitney thereafter. John Forsythe served as assistant referee.

A short-lived revival of the show aired in 2008. In July 2023, following the BBC’s revival of the British version, the show was confirmed to return for the second time, set to be revived by Warner Bros. Television Studios and began broadcasting on Network Ten on 15 January 2024, hosted by Beau Ryan and Liz Ellis, but was cancelled in May later that year due to a lack of audience.

== Format ==
The premise of the show involves permanent competitors called "Gladiators" being put up against one-time-only "Challengers" in several different events which tests both physical and mental capabilities. In a typical episode, two men and two women compete for points against the Gladiators across four different events, with separate events for males and females. After this, each pair then competes against each other in The Eliminator, an obstacle course, of which any points they have won previously go towards time for a head start on their opponent. The winner of this is dubbed the champion of the episode. The episode champions then compete in the finals series.

== Events ==
Each episode features four events chosen at random, followed by the final round, the Eliminator.

The first series of Gladiators featured many events that continued to run for the following series. The events featured in the first series were Atlaspheres, Duel, Gauntlet, Hang Tough, Hit & Run, Powerball, Pyramid, Suspension Bridge, Tilt, and the Wall. The second series introduced a few new events; Pursuit, Swingshot and Whiplash. The third series introduced further events; Joust and Skytrak. In all series, The Eliminator is played at the end of every episode.

=== Events ===
==== Atlaspheres ====
The two challengers and the two gladiators are caged in large Atlaspheres (spherical metal cages) that they have to propel themselves from within. The challengers' task is to roll the spheres onto any of four scoring pods, each pod scoring two points. They are given 60 seconds to score as many points as they can in this fashion, whilst the gladiators must block the challengers from scoring.

==== Duel ====
The challenger and a gladiator are each placed atop of an elevated platform with a short distance apart. Armed with a pugil stick, they would attempt to cause the other to fall from their platform within 30 seconds. This could be achieved with either an offensive or a defensive strategy, although some challengers were disqualified if they made no attacking move towards the gladiator. A score of 10 points is awarded if the challenger knocks the gladiator off the platform. If the challenger manages to stay on the platform for the entire 30 seconds but doesn't knock the gladiator off the platform, they score 5 points.

==== Gauntlet ====
The challenger has to run through a gauntlet while passing five gladiators armed with ramrods. The second and fourth having power pads to slow the challenger down. The challenger must run through the course within 25 seconds to earn 5 points but if they run through the course within 20 seconds, they earn 10 points.

==== Hang Tough ====
The challenger and gladiator begin on opposite sides of the arena, on raised platforms. Between them hangs a grid of suspended rings, similar to gymnastic rings. The challenger's task is to reach the gladiator's platform by swinging between the rings, scoring ten points if successful. The gladiator meanwhile, swinging in the opposite direction, would attempt to intercept the challenger and pull them down. If the challenger manages to hang on for the entire 60 seconds regardless if he/she knocks the gladiator, and reaches the fifth row of rings (painted red) but not the opposite platform, they score 5 points.

==== Hit and Run ====
The challenger has 30 seconds to run back and forth across a suspension bridge, scoring two points for each crossing. Four gladiators (two on each side of the bridge) attempt to knock the challenger off using four large demolition balls.

==== Joust ====
The challenger and the gladiator sit on skybikes that twist, buck and spin like a rocking rodeo. Both players have combat clubs with which they attempt to knock each other off. The challenger would score 10 points for knocking the gladiator off, 5 for staying on for the 60 seconds. The music played during the Australian version of the Joust was actually the Pole-Axe music used in the UK version of the show. Also, the actual Joust game used in Australia was shipped over from the UK Gladiators, after the game was retired in the UK version.

==== Powerball ====
Two challengers face three gladiators on the Powerball pitch. Challengers had 45 or 60 seconds to place balls in the five scoring baskets on the pitch (2 points for a score in one of the four outer baskets and 3 points for the middle) whilst the Gladiators had to prevent them from scoring by tackling. (The amount of time in this game varied from season to season)

==== Pursuit ====
Two challengers race against each other over an obstacle course, chased by two gladiators. The challengers run first then the gladiators run five seconds later. The course comprised a snake beam, hand ladder, wire bridge, two web traps, a high and low wall and a sprint finish. First challenger to finish the course scores 10 points, second five. If at any point the challenger gets tagged by the chasing gladiator, they score no points. If the challengers fail to complete certain parts of the course or knock over any part of the course (ie... coloured markers), they may be allocated penalties of 1 or 2 points per infringement.

==== Pyramid ====
Two challengers and two gladiators face each other on a giant pyramid. The challengers aim to reach the summit, whilst the gladiators aim to stop them by throwing the challengers down to the bottom. The first challenger to reach the top of the pyramid and push the button within 60 seconds would score 10 points. If the other challenger could make it in the remaining time, they would score 5. If a Gladiator attacks a challenger while they are on the bottom step or makes a tackle below the waist however, the challenger is awarded ten points even if they did not make it to the top.

==== Skytrack ====
Two challengers and two gladiators compete in this event, which was a race around a figure-eight track suspended from the ceiling. Both competitors and gladiators compete upside down. The contestants have a small head start and the Gladiators have to hit a buzzer trailing behind the contestant in order to eliminate them.

==== Suspension Bridge ====
The challenger and gladiator, armed with hammerheads, face each other on a suspension bridge. The challenger has 30 or 60 seconds to cross the bridge for 10 points. If they can survive for the full-time, they score 5. (The amount of time in this game varied from season to season)

==== Swingshot ====
The challengers and gladiators are suspended and attached to bungie cords facing towards the centre of the arena where a basket of coloured balls sit atop a high column. The challengers are to drop towards the ground, bounce up to grab a coloured ball, then bounce back to their stations where a scoring basket sits. Gladiators have to time their jumps to block the challengers' movements. The red balls are worth three points, the blue balls are worth two and the white balls are worth one.

==== Tilt ====
An aerial tug of war in which both the challenger and the gladiator are on tilting platforms. The challenger is placed on the lower platform, which is tilted back, and the gladiator is placed on the higher platform tilted forwards. Because of their weight advantage, the gladiators had the harder job of having to tilt their table back in order to get any leverage on the rope. Two 30-second bouts are played. The challengers earn five points each time they pull the gladiator out of their platform, two for staying on for the 30 seconds. The event was axed after Series 2. Gladiators have stated that this game was very difficult for the Gladiator, and was heavily in favour of the contestant due to the height of the Gladiator's podium, and therefore gravity.

==== Wall ====
The challengers climb up a wall with hand and foot holds while the gladiators are set off seven seconds behind. First to the top of the wall scores 10 points, second five. A challenger can still score 5 points if they manage to hang onto the wall for the full minute. Male and Female challengers had different walls to climb.

==== Whiplash ====
The challenger and gladiator grip a "dog bone" and the challenger must use this to pull the gladiator out of the ring, earning 10 points if successful. Both players must grab and hold on to the dog bone and they may use tactics to force the other player to let go of the bone, and win the game.

=== The Eliminator ===
This event is played at the end of every episode. It involves a head-to-head contest between the two female challengers, and between the two male challengers. They both have to complete an obstacle course in the quickest time possible. The challenger who has earned the most points throughout the episode starts the course earlier than the other, based on how many points they were leading by. For every point they lead by, they start half a second earlier.

In the original series the course consisted of padded hurdles of varying heights, a rope climb, monkey bars (a hand bike for male challengers during Season 2–3), running across spinning logs, climbing up a cargo net, going down a flying fox, walking across a balancing beam, running up a travelator which is going in the opposite direction, then after that, the first challenger to swing on a tarzan rope through the crate paper banner at the finish line is the winner of the episode.

== Gladiators ==
Unless otherwise noted, all Gladiators appeared in all three domestic series'.

The Gladiators with hosts Mike Hammond and Kimberley Joseph in the second series.

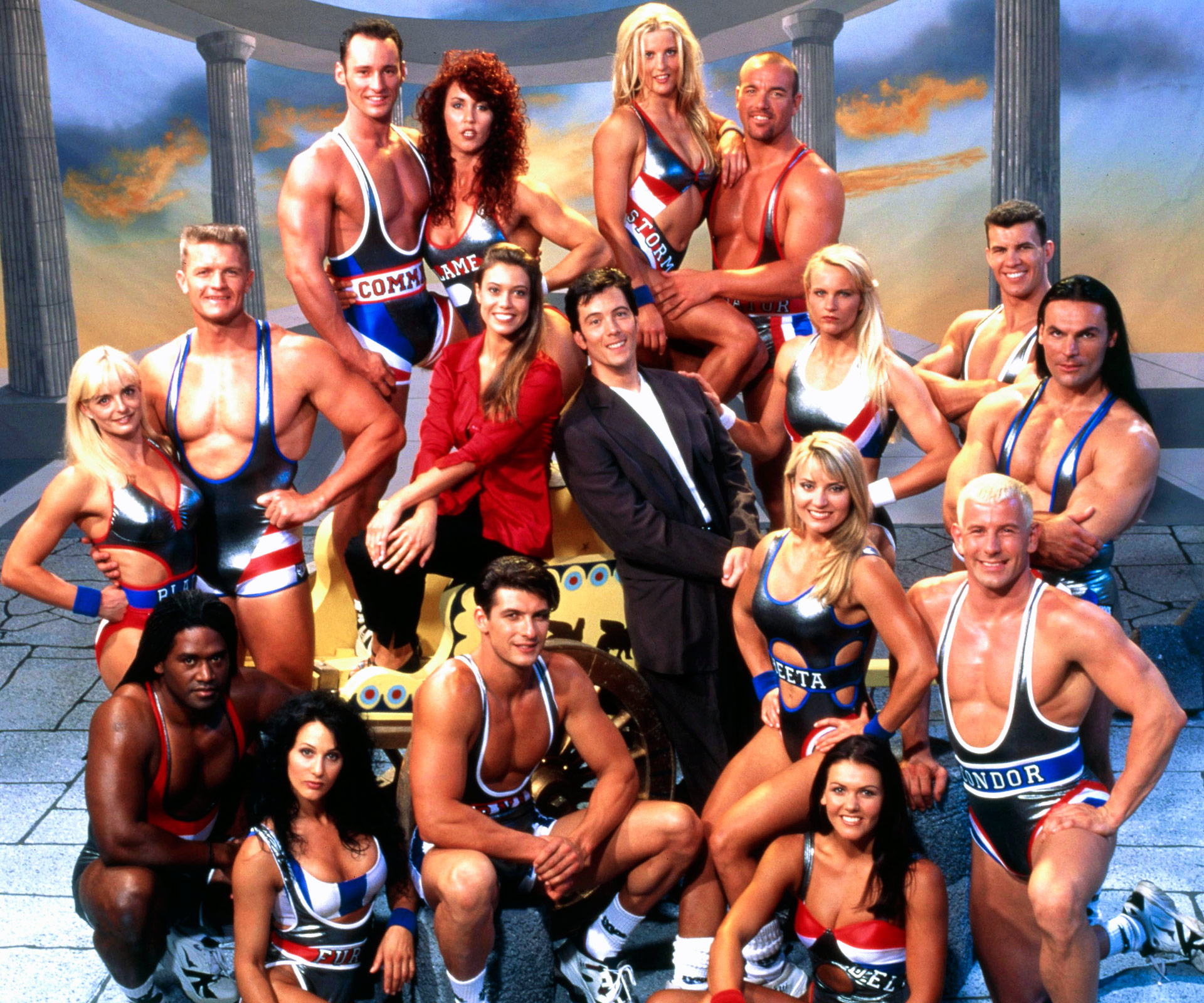
Hosts Joseph and Hammond with the Gladiators from Series 3

=== Male ===
- Commando – Geoff Barker (Series 2 & 3)
- Condor – Alistair Gibb
- Cougar – Ashley Buck (Series 1 and 2)
- Force – John Gergelifi (Series 1)*
- Hammer – Mark McGaw
- Predator – Tony Forrow (Series 2 and 3)
- Taipan – Michael Melksham
- Tornado – Tony Latina (Series 3)
- Tower – Ron Reeve
- Vulcan – John Seru

Note: *Force suffered an injury in Atlasphere in the third quarter final and had to retire from the show.

=== Female ===
- Blade – Bev Carter
- Cheeta – Nicky Davico
- Delta – Karyn Alley
- Electra – Roz Forsyth (Series 3 Reserve)
- Flame – Linda Byrnes
- Fury – Julie Saunders
- Glacier – Lourene Bevaart (Series 3)
- Rebel – Barbara Kendell (Series 1 and 2)
- Storm – Charlene Symonds

== Champions ==
Series champions
Series		Female	Male
1	Winner	Bernadette Withers	Andrew Halliday
1	Runner-Up	Teresa Brett	David Wallis
2	Winner	Lourene Bevaart	Shane Saltmarsh
2	Runner-Up	Kathy McMorrow	Joe Lukowski
3	Winner	Marisa Huettner	Paul Reynolds
3	Runner-Up	Catherine Arlove	Paul Stubbs

== Transmissions ==
=== Domestic ===
Series	Episodes	Originally aired	
Series	Episodes	First aired	Last aired
1	15	29 April 1995	5 August 1995
2	15	2 September 1995	2 December 1995
3	24 (Note: Series 3 consisted of 15 episodes, plus 3 special series consisting of 3 episodes each; Individual Sports Challenge, Team Sports Special and Army Vs Navy)	13 April 1996	21 September 1996

=== The Ashes ===
Series	Episodes	Originally aired	
Series	Episodes	First aired	Last aired
1	3	12 August 1995	26 August 1995
2	3	28 September 1996	12 October 1996

=== Australia vs Russia ===
Series	Episodes	Originally aired	
Series	Episodes	First aired	Last aired
1	3	1996	1996

=== International ===
Series	Episodes	Originally aired	
Series	Episodes	First aired	Last aired
2	7	17 February 1996	6 April 1996

== Cheerleaders ==
- Choreographers: Davidia Lind, Simon Lind
- Cheerleaders: Cintra Bedford, Jane Crichton, Jessica Emblen, Sarah Harlow, Tamra Lind, Tamara Raup, Emma Sieber, Leigh-Anne Vizer, Francene Vedelago, Kyle Watson

== After the show ==
In early 2007, an episode of the television series Where Are They Now? featured some of the Gladiators as special guests including Flame, Storm, Commando, Predator, Glacier, Vulcan as well as Mike Whitney, the referee during the second and third series. The Seven Network used this segment as research towards reviving the show depending on viewer numbers for the episode as well as if the ratings fell after the end of the segment.

On 9th August 2023, Gladiators was featured as a contestant speciality subject on TV Show “Hard Quiz”.

=== Revivals ===
==== First revival ====
On 9 September 2007, it was officially announced by the Seven Network that the show was being revived and would return in early 2008. Auditions for new gladiators took place via e-mail and closed on 16 October 2007 while auditions for challengers took place in Brisbane, Sydney, Melbourne, Adelaide and Perth from 20 October to 4 November 2007. Once the gladiators and challengers had been chosen, filming of all the episodes for this new season took place from 6 January 2008 to 10 February 2008 at The Dome, Sydney Showground, New South Wales.

The revived series of Gladiators consisted of 15 episodes and premiered on 30 March 2008.

==== Second revival ====
A second revival was announced in 2023 and will air in early 2024 on Network Ten.
