= Itzel Nayeli García Montaño =

Mexican serial killer and criminal

Itzel Nayelí Montaño García (born 1995 in Chimalhuacán, State of Mexico, Mexico) is an alleged Mexican spree killer accused of a series of crimes committed in the municipality of Chimalhuacán. Montaño attacked random strangers from behind, stabbing them in the neck. There was a total of seven attacks, two of which were fatal.

She was nicknamed "The Decapitator of Chimalhuacán" by the media. She was a disorganized killer, highlighted by the fact that her attacks were committed "body to body", an unusual modus operandi in female spree killers.

== Life ==
Itzel Montaño was born in 1995, in Chimalhuacán, State of Mexico, to a poor family in which she was the second of six children, her father working unofficially as a "car washer". Her childhood was spent in a marginalized area of her home municipality, sharing a house with her parents, siblings and several relatives. She used to take care of her younger siblings while her parents worked, and was described by relatives and acquaintances as "quiet and calm". She attended school only until the third grade, as her childhood and adolescence were marked by poverty.

At the age of 14, she moved in with a man and entered into a domestic partnership. At a young age she got pregnant for the first and only time—she suffered from an ectopic pregnancy, making it a necessity to undergo a hysterectomy in order to save her life, leaving her sterile. At age 16, she separated from her partner and began to consume alcohol, tobacco, and inhalants excessively. She maintained herself by selling sweets outside the Mexico City Metro. She had difficulties with reading, writing and maths.

At age 17, she met her second husband, a man named Rafael who drove a minibus. She moved in with him only after a few months of relationship. Their relationship was difficult, with fights which often ended in physical aggression.

== Crimes ==
The first attack attributed to Montaño occurred on September 14, 2015. The victim was a man named Antonio Soto Leyva. The 43-year-old was attacked at 5:30 am by a woman who approached him from behind and stabbed him in the neck. Despite a 15-centimetre (5.9 in) injury to his neck, no vital organs were damaged and the victim survived. Soto was able to pursue his attacker for 50 metres (160 ft), but could not catch her.

The first fatality attributed to the killer came just a day later, on September 15, when a 40-year-old woman named Rosario Laureano Ventura was attacked. The woman was travelling on a bus when she was repeatedly stabbed in the neck by a young woman. That same day there was a second attack, that of Rosa María Jímenez Martínez, who managed to survive. The second murder attributed to the murderer occurred on September 17, 2015, when a 16-year-old woman, Brenda Chantal Mondragón Martínez, was assaulted while walking to her school. The killer cut her jugular vein.

Throughout September 2015, there were at least three more attacks on two men and one woman, which were non-fatal. One of victims was José Alberto Pichardo, 36, who was stabbed in the abdomen and then in the neck; Pichardo came to declare that his attacker was "very fast," like a "ninja".

== Reaction and investigations ==
Soon the rumor began to spread that there was an active murderer in Chimalhuacán randomly attacking people on the streets. The neighbours began to form vigilante groups, arming themselves with blunt and sharp weapons, as well as firearms. Soon the media also began to cover the case and dubbed the alleged murderer as "The Decapitator of Chimalhuacán". A mass hysteria developed.

With the collaboration of victims and some witnesses, the police developed a profile of the attacker—she was described as a woman between 20 and 25 years of age, with light brown skin, long dark hair, thin, well-dressed and with two tattoos of the Santa Muerte. At first, it was theorised that the attacker could be a man dressed as a woman, because the killer's style of attack is atypical to female murderers, but this hypothesis was rejected.

There was no clear pattern in the victims, but the modus operandi was the same in every attack—the suspect approached the victim from behind in a public space and stabbed their neck from the back with a pocket knife. The perpetrator's characteristics made the victims feel not threatened. All attacks occurred in the neighbourhoods of tanners, farmers, cabinet makers, artisans and fishermen, and occurred mostly in the morning. Patrols were started by police on a recurring basis in order to arrest a suspect.

== Arrest and trial ==
On October 2, 2015, after 20 days of investigation, Montaño was arrested in the vicinity of her home in Chimalhuacán, after being reported by her partner and a by a fellow street vendor. Both men reported that she tried to kill them by cutting their necks. She admitted to these two attacks and confessed to have committed them under the influence of alcohol and inhalants. Both attacks occurred on September 13, 2015; the aggression towards the partner occurred in the context of a domestic fight and the second, against a man named "Jorge", known as the "leader of the street vendors", who demanded Montaño pay him so that she could sell her sweets. At first the police denied that Montaño was related to the Decapitator's crimes, but by October 9, 2015, they reversed that statement and claimed that she was a suspect in the murders.

In July 2017, Montaño was sentenced to 20 years in prison on a charge of attempted murder, and is still awaiting trial for other charges. Her motives remain unknown, but according to declarations of relatives, when she consumed inhalants her behaviour changed drastically, becoming violent and uninhibited. She is believed to have been on drugs in all the attacks, as well as the two attacks she confessed to.
