= Itzel Reza =

Mexican canoeist (born 1979)

Itzel Reza (born May 29, 1979) is a Mexican sprint canoer who competed in the mid-1990s. She was eliminated in the semifinals of the K-4 500 m event at the 1996 Summer Olympics in Atlanta.
