= Ingrid Haralamow =

Swiss canoeist

Olympic medal record

Women's canoe sprint
| Silver medal – second place | 1996 Atlanta | K-4 500 m |

Ingrid Haralamow-Raimann (born 29 July 1966) is a Swiss sprint canoer who competed in the 1990s. Competing in two Summer Olympics, she won a silver medal in the K-4 500 m event at Atlanta in 1996.
