= Daniela Baumer =

Swiss canoeist (born 1971)

Personal information
- Born: 8 September 1971 (age 54)
Medal record
Women's canoe sprint
Representing Switzerland
Olympic Games
Silver medal – second place	1996 Atlanta	K-4 500 m

Daniela Baumer (born 8 September 1971) is a Swiss sprint canoer who competed in the mid-1990s. She won a silver medal in the K-4 500 m event at the 1996 Summer Olympics in Atlanta.
