= Neli Zafirova =

Bulgarian canoeist

- Born: Bulgaria
- Occupation: Olympic athlete
- Years active: 1990s
- Known for: Semifinalist of the K-2 500 m event.

Neli Zafirova (Bulgarian: Нели Зафирова) (born December 22, 1976) is a Bulgarian sprint canoer who competed in the mid-1990s. At the 1996 Summer Olympics in Atlanta, she was eliminated in the semifinals of the K-2 500 m event.
