= Mike Hammond (footballer) =

Australian rules footballer (1945–2018)

Personal information
- Full name: Michael Olver Hammond
- Born: 10 July 1945
- Died: 6 June 2018 (aged 72); Richmond, Victoria, Australia
- Original team: Maryborough
- Height: 191 cm (6 ft 3 in)
- Weight: 96 kg (212 lb)
- Position: Ruck

Playing career^{1}
Years	Club	Games (Goals)
1964–66	Richmond	31 (10)
- ^{1} Playing statistics correct to the end of 1966.

Michael Olver Hammond (10 July 1945 – 6 June 2018) was an Australian rules footballer who played with Richmond in the Victorian Football League (VFL).

Originally from Maryborough, Victoria, Hammond played for Maryborough Football Club in the Ballarat Football League and Eaglehawk and Golden Square Football Clubs in the Bendigo Football League.
