= John Seru =

Fijian professional wrestler

- Born: John Seru; 12 January 1964 (age 62); Fiji
- Occupations: Wrestler, actor
- Years active: 1984−present
- Professional wrestling career
- Ring name(s): John Seru; Fijian Warrior; Vulcan
- Billed height: 6 ft 3 in (191 cm)
- Billed weight: 264 lb (120 kg)
- Billed from: "Fiji Islands"
- Trained by: Boris Malenko; Dean Malenko; Joe Malenko
- Debut: 1999

John Seru (born 12 January 1964) is a Fijian actor and former professional wrestler.

== Biography ==
Seru was trained by father and son Boris and Dean Malenko at the renowned Malenko Wrestling Academy in Tampa, Florida, USA (1994). He is best known as "Vulcan" in the Australian version of TV series Gladiators, as well as joining the British Gladiators team in Seasons 7 and 8. He is also known for his part in the James Bond film, The World Is Not Enough, where he plays henchman Gabor. He owns and runs a wrestling school, fitness center, and gym equipment shop that he has been running for over 30 years in Menai, Sydney with his wife Christina and their family.

== Championships and accomplishments ==
- International Wrestling Australia
  - IWA Heavyweight Championship (2 time)

== Filmography ==
John Seru film and television credits
Year	Title	Role	Notes	Ref.
1995–1996	Gladiators	Vulcan		
1999	The World Is Not Enough	Gabor		
1999–2001	Beastmaster	Muscle Protector #2 / Sentinel #2	3 episodes	
2003	Fat Pizza	Lennox Blewis		
2010	Underbelly: The Golden Mile	Kiwi Steve		
