= Norway at the 2004 Summer Olympics =

- IOC code: NOR
- NOC: Norwegian Olympic Committee and Confederation of Sports
- Website: www.idrett.no (in Norwegian)

in Athens
- Competitors: 53 in 12 sports
- Flag bearer: Harald Stenvaag
- Medals Ranked 17th: Gold 5 Silver 0 Bronze 1 Total 6

Summer Olympics appearances (overview)
- 1900; ~~1904~~; 1908; 1912; 1920; 1924; 1928; 1932; 1936; 1948; 1952; 1956; 1960; 1964; 1968; 1972; 1976; 1980; 1984; 1988; 1992; 1996; 2000; 2004; 2008; 2012; 2016; 2020; 2024; 2028

Other related appearances
- 1906 Intercalated Games

Norway competed at the 2004 Summer Olympics in Athens, Greece, from 13 to 29 August 2004. This was the nation's twenty-fourth appearance at the Summer Olympics, except for the 1904 Summer Olympics in St. Louis, and the 1980 Summer Olympics in Moscow, due to the country's support of the United States boycott. With the absence of women's football and handball teams, Norwegian Olympic and Paralympic Committee and Confederation of Sports sent the nation's smallest delegation to the Games since the 1968 Summer Olympics in Mexico City. A total of 53 athletes, 36 men and 17 women, competed only in 12 different sports. There was only a single competitor in badminton, swimming, taekwondo, weightlifting, and wrestling.

Sixteen athletes from the Norwegian team had previously competed in Sydney, including Olympic silver medalists Kjersti Plätzer in women's race walk and Olaf Tufte in men's single sculls. At age 51, rifle shooting veteran Harald Stenvaag became the second Norwegian in Summer Olympic history to participate in six Games, tying a record set by sailor Magnus Konow. He was appointed by the National Olympic Committee to carry the Norwegian flag in the opening ceremony. Other notable Norwegian athletes featured kayak pair and world champions Nils Olav Fjeldheim and Eirik Verås Larsen, yachting siblings Christoffer and Siren Sundby, and breaststroke swimmer Alexander Dale Oen, the youngest of the team at age 19.

Despite fielding its smallest team since 1968, Norway left Athens with a remarkable tally of six medals, five golds and one bronze. As a result, the Games were considered the nation's most successful Summer Olympics since 1920.

== Medalists ==
Medal	Name	Sport	Event	Date
Gold	Olaf Tufte	Rowing	Men's single sculls	August 21
Gold	Siren Sundby	Sailing	Europe class	August 22
Gold	Eirik Verås Larsen	Canoeing	Men's K-1 1000 m	August 27
Gold	Gunn-Rita Dahle Flesjå	Cycling	Women's cross-country	August 27
Gold	Andreas Thorkildsen	Athletics	Men's javelin throw	August 28
Bronze	Nils Olav Fjeldheim; Eirik Verås Larsen	Canoeing	Men's K-2 1000 m	August 27

== Athletics ==
Norwegian athletes have so far achieved qualifying standards in the following athletics events (up to a maximum of 3 athletes in each event at the 'A' Standard, and 1 at the 'B' Standard).

Key

- Note–Ranks given for track events are within the athlete's heat only
- Q = Qualified for the next round
- q = Qualified for the next round as a fastest loser or, in field events, by position without achieving the qualifying target
- NR = National record
- N/A = Round not applicable for the event
- Bye = Athlete not required to compete in round

Men
Track & road events

Athlete	Event	Heat		Final	
Athlete	Event	Result	Rank	Result	Rank
Marius Bakken	5000 m	13:36.38	12	Did not advance	
Trond Nymark	50 km walk	—N/a		3:53:20	13
Jim Svenøy	3000 m steeplechase	8:33.97	10	Did not advance	
Erik Tysse	20 km walk	—N/a		DNS	

Field events

Athlete	Event	Qualification		Final	
Athlete	Event	Distance	Position	Distance	Position
Ronny Nilsen	Javelin throw	72.70	29	Did not advance	
Andreas Thorkildsen	Javelin throw	81.74	8 Q	86.50	1st place, gold medalist(s)

Combined events – Decathlon

Athlete	Event	100 m	LJ	SP	HJ	400 m	110H	DT	PV	JT	1500 m	Final	Rank
Hans Olav Uldal	Result	11.23	6.99	13.53	1.85	50.95	15.09	43.01	4.50	60.00	4:41.70	7495	27
Hans Olav Uldal	Points	810	811	700	670	771	839	726	760	738	670	7495	27

Women
Track & road events

Athlete	Event	Heat		Semifinal		Final	
Athlete	Event	Result	Rank	Result	Rank	Result	Rank
Stine Larsen	Marathon	—N/a				2:39:55	24
Trine Pilskog	1500 m	4:08.61	10	Did not advance			
Kjersti Plätzer	20 km walk	—N/a				1:30.49	12

== Badminton ==
Athlete	Event	Round of 32	Round of 16	Quarterfinal	Semifinal	Final / BM	
Athlete	Event	Opposition Score	Opposition Score	Opposition Score	Opposition Score	Opposition Score	Rank
Jim Ronny Andersen	Men's singles	Yang (GUA); W 15–9, 8–15, 15–6	Kuncoro (INA); L 7–15, 6–15	Did not advance			

== Canoeing ==
=== Sprint ===
Athlete	Event	Heats		Semifinals		Final	
Athlete	Event	Time	Rank	Time	Rank	Time	Rank
Eirik Verås Larsen	Men's K-1 500 m	1:36.905	1 q	1:38.361	1 Q	1:38.667	4
Eirik Verås Larsen	Men's K-1 1000 m	3:25.150	1 Q	Bye		3:25.897	1st place, gold medalist(s)
Nils Olav Fjeldheim; Eirik Verås Larsen	Men's K-2 1000 m	3:09.247	1 Q	Bye		3:19.528	3rd place, bronze medalist(s)
Andreas Gjersøe; Mattis Næss; Jacob Norenberg; Alexander Wefald	Men's K-4 1000 m	2:54.894	4 q	2:54.350	2 Q	3:01.698	5

Qualification Legend: Q = Qualify to final; q = Qualify to semifinal

== Cycling ==
=== Road ===
Men

Athlete	Event	Time	Rank
Kurt Asle Arvesen	Road race	5:41:56	9
Kurt Asle Arvesen	Time trial	1:02:21.28	28
Morten Hegreberg	Road race	Did not finish	
Thor Hushovd	Road race	Did not finish	
Thor Hushovd	Time trial	1:03:10.36	32
Mads Kaggestad	Road race	Did not finish	

Women

Athlete	Event	Time	Rank
Lene Byberg	Road race	3:33:35	48
Linn Torp	Road race	3:40:43	53
Anita Valen	Road race	3:25:42	14
Anita Valen	Time trial	34:31.94	22

=== Mountain biking ===
Athlete	Event	Time	Rank
Gunn-Rita Dahle Flesjå	Women's cross-country	1:56:51	1st place, gold medalist(s)

== Rowing ==
Norwegian rowers qualified the following boats:

Men

Athlete	Event	Heats		Repechage		Semifinals		Final	
Athlete	Event	Time	Rank	Time	Rank	Time	Rank	Time	Rank
Olaf Tufte	Single sculls	7:12.53	1 SA/B/C	Bye		6:50.55	1 FA	6:49.30	1st place, gold medalist(s)
Morten Adamsen; Nils-Torolv Simonsen	Double sculls	6:45.26	2 SA/B	Bye		6:14.69	3 FA	6:37.25	7

Qualification Legend: FA=Final A (medal); FB=Final B (non-medal); FC=Final C (non-medal); FD=Final D (non-medal); FE=Final E (non-medal); FF=Final F (non-medal); SA/B=Semifinals A/B; SC/D=Semifinals C/D; SE/F=Semifinals E/F; R=Repechage

== Sailing ==
Norwegian sailors have qualified one boat for each of the following events.

Women

Athlete	Event	Race											Net points	Final rank
Athlete	Event	1	2	3	4	5	6	7	8	9	10	M*	Net points	Final rank
Jannicke Stålstrøm	Mistral	9	3	7	15	14	12	11	8	14	14	~~OCS~~	107	11
Siren Sundby	Europe	1	3	~~DSQ~~	1	19	4	4	1	1	1	12	47	1st place, gold medalist(s)
Karianne Eikeland; Lise Birgitte Fredriksen; Beate Kristiansen	Yngling	14	13	4	6	10	1	14	8	9	~~15~~	6	85	9

Open

Athlete	Event	Race																Net points	Final rank
Athlete	Event	1	2	3	4	5	6	7	8	9	10	11	12	13	14	15	M*	Net points	Final rank
Peer Moberg	Laser	7	18	37	23	12	26	34	14	3	~~DSQ~~	—N/a					24	198	21
Frode Bovim; Christoffer Sundby	49er	1	3	9	~~OCS~~	6	4	13	8	~~15~~	11	6	9	11	3	2	2	88	4

M = Medal race; OCS = On course side of the starting line; DSQ = Disqualified; DNF = Did not finish; DNS= Did not start; RDG = Redress given

== Shooting ==
Five Norwegian shooters qualified to compete in the following events:

Men

Athlete	Event	Qualification		Final	
Athlete	Event	Points	Rank	Points	Rank
Espen Berg-Knutsen	10 m air rifle	584	=41	Did not advance	
Espen Berg-Knutsen	50 m rifle prone	592	=16	Did not advance	
Espen Berg-Knutsen	50 m rifle 3 positions	1156	=22	Did not advance	
Harald Jensen	Skeet	122 (5)	6 Q	145	6
Leif Steinar Rolland	10 m air rifle	592	=18	Did not advance	
Harald Stenvaag	50 m rifle prone	592	=16	Did not advance	
Harald Stenvaag	50 m rifle 3 positions	1149	30	Did not advance	
Erik Watndal	Skeet	121	8	Did not advance	

== Swimming ==
Norwegian swimmers earned qualifying standards in the following events (up to a maximum of 2 swimmers in each event at the A-standard time, and 1 at the B-standard time):

Men

Athlete	Event	Heat		Semifinal		Final	
Athlete	Event	Time	Rank	Time	Rank	Time	Rank
Alexander Dale Oen	100 m breaststroke	1:02.25	21	Did not advance			

== Taekwondo ==
Norway has qualified a single taekwondo jin.

Athlete	Event	Round of 16	Quarterfinals	Semifinals	Repechage 1	Repechage 2	Final / BM	
Athlete	Event	Opposition Result	Opposition Result	Opposition Result	Opposition Result	Opposition Result	Opposition Result	Rank
Nina Solheim	Women's −67 kg	Šarić (CRO); W 5–2	Luo W (CHN); L RSC	Did not advance	Hwang K-S (KOR); L WO	Did not advance		7

== Volleyball ==
=== Beach ===
Athlete	Event	Preliminary round	Standing	Round of 16	Quarterfinals	Semifinals	Final	
Athlete	Event	Opposition Score	Standing	Opposition Score	Opposition Score	Opposition Score	Opposition Score	Rank
Vegard Høidalen; Jørre Kjemperud	Men's	Pool D Berg – Dahl (SWE); L 0 – 2 (13–21, 18–21); Hernández – Papaleo (PUR); W 2 – 1 (18–21, 21–19, 15–10); Dieckmann – Reckermann (GER); W 2 – 1 (22–24, 26–24, 15–13)	3 Q	Rego – Santos (BRA); L 1 – 2 (15–21, 21–19, 6–15)	Did not advance			
Iver Horrem; Bjørn Maaseide	Men's	Pool A Rego – Santos (BRA); L 1 – 2 (15–21, 21–19, 10–15); Holdren – Metzger (USA); W 2 – 1 (16–21, 22–20, 15–9); Schacht – Slack (AUS); L 0 – 2 (18–21, 17–21)	4	Did not advance				
Susanne Glesnes; Kathrine Maaseide	Women's	Pool D McPeak – Youngs (USA); L 0 – 2 (14–21, 14–21); Kuhn – Schnyder (SUI); W 2 – 1 (21–18, 17–21, 15–13); Dumont – Martin (CAN); L 0 – 2 (19–21, 27–29)	3	Did not advance				
Nila Håkedal; Ingrid Tørlen	Women's	Pool C Connelly – Pires (BRA); L 0 – 2 (18–21, 19–21); Arvaniti – Koutroumanidou (GRE); L 1 – 2 (11–21, 23–21, 12–15); Lahme – Müsch (GER); W 2 – 1 (13–21, 21–17, 15–12)	4	Did not advance				

== Weightlifting ==
Norway has qualified a single weightlifter.

Athlete	Event	Snatch		Clean & Jerk		Total	Rank
Athlete	Event	Result	Rank	Result	Rank	Total	Rank
Stian Grimseth	Men's +105 kg	185	=12	~~205~~	DNF	185	DNF

== Wrestling ==
Key:

- VT - Victory by Fall.
- PP - Decision by Points - the loser with technical points.
- PO - Decision by Points - the loser without technical points.

Men's Greco-Roman

Athlete	Event	Elimination Pool			Quarterfinal	Semifinal	Final / BM	
Athlete	Event	Opposition Result	Opposition Result	Rank	Opposition Result	Opposition Result	Opposition Result	Rank
Fritz Aanes	−84 kg	Avramis (GRE); L 1–3 ^{PP}	Jamshidi (IRI); L 0–3 ^{PO}	3	Did not advance			15

== See also ==
- Norway at the 2004 Summer Paralympics
