= Canoeing at the 2000 Summer Olympics – Men's K-2 1000 metres =

The men's K-2 1000 metres event was a pairs kayaking event conducted as part of the Canoeing at the 2000 Summer Olympics program.

== Medalists ==
Gold	Silver	Bronze
Antonio Rossi and Beniamino Bonomi (ITA)	Markus Oscarsson and Henrik Nilsson (SWE)	Krisztián Bártfai and Krisztián Veréb (HUN)

== Results ==
=== Heats ===
18 crews entered in two heats. The top three finishers from both heats advanced directly to the finals. Fourth through seventh-place finishers in each heat along with the fastest eighth-place finisher advanced to the semifinal.

Heat 1 of 2 Date: Tuesday 26 September 2000
Place	Overall	Nation	Athletes	Time	Qual.
1	2	Italy	Antonio Rossi and Beniamino Bonomi	3:14.316	QF
2	5	Sweden	Markus Oscarsson and Henrik Nilsson	3:15.102	QF
3	8	Slovakia	Juraj Bača and Michal Riszdorfer	3:16.854	QF
4	11	Great Britain	Paul Darby-Dowman and Ross Sabberton	3:19.392	QS
5	12	Czech Republic	Jan Souček and Jan Andrlik	3:20.760	QS
6	14	Australia	Brian Morton and Luke Young	3:20.934	QS
7	15	Brazil	Sebastián Cuattrin and Carlos Campos	3:21.228	QS
8	16	Bulgaria	Marian Dimitrov and Dimitar Ivanov	3:23.646	
9	18	Argentina	Fernando Redondo and Abelardo Sztrum	3:24.324	

Heat 2 of 2 Date: Tuesday 26 September 2000
Place	Overall	Nation	Athletes	Time	Qual.
1	1	Hungary	Krisztián Bártfai and Krisztián Veréb	3:13.677	QF
2	3	Germany	Andreas Ihle and Olaf Winter	3:14.631	QF
3	4	France	Bâbak Amir-Tahmasseb and Philippe Aubertin	3:14.835	QF
4	6	Norway	Eirik Verås Larsen and Nils Olav Fjeldheim	3:15.483	QS
5	8	Poland	Marek Twardowski and Adam Wysocki	3:15.909	QS
6	9	Denmark	Paw Madsen and Jesper Staal	3:16.989	QS
7	10	Russia	Yevgeny Salakhov and Oleg Gorobiy	3:17.067	QS
8	13	Israel	Rami Zur and Ro'l Yellin	3:20.913	QS
9	18	United States	Philippe Boccara and Cliff Meidl	3:26.439	

Overall Results Heats

Heats Overall Results
Place	Athlete	Nation	Heat	Place	Time	Qual.
1	Hungary	Krisztián Bártfai and Krisztián Veréb	2	1	3:13.677	QF
2	Italy	Antonio Rossi and Beniamino Bonomi	1	1	3:14.316	QF
3	Germany	Andreas Ihle and Olaf Winter	2	3	3:14.631	QF
4	France	Bâbak Amir-Tahmasseb and Philippe Aubertin	2	3	3:14.835	QF
5	Sweden	Markus Oscarsson and Henrik Nilsson	1	2	3:15.102	QF
6	Norway	Eirik Verås Larsen and Nils Olav Fjeldheim	2	4	3:15.483	QS
7	Poland	Marek Twardowski and Adam Wysocki	2	5	3:15.909	QS
8	Slovakia	Juraj Bača and Michal Riszdorfer	1	3	3:16.854	QF
9	Denmark	Paw Madsen and Jesper Staal	2	6	3:16.989	QS
10	Russia	Yevgeny Salakhov and Oleg Gorobiy	2	7	3:17.067	QS
11	Great Britain	Paul Darby-Dowman and Ross Sabberton	1	4	3:19.392	QS
12	Czech Republic	Jan Souček and Jan Andrlik	1	5	3:20.760	QS
13	Israel	Rami Zur and Ro'l Yellin	2	8	3:20.913	QS
14	Australia	Brian Morton and Luke Young	1	6	3:20.934	QS
15	Brazil	Sebastián Cuattrin and Carlos Campos	1	7	3:21.228	QS
16	Bulgaria	Marian Dimitrov and Dimitar Ivanov	1	8	3:23.646	
17	Argentina	Fernando Redondo and Abelardo Sztrum	1	9	3:24.324	
18	United States	Philippe Boccara and Cliff Meidl	2	9	3:26.439	

=== Semifinal ===
The top three finishers in the semifinal advanced to the final.

Heat 1 of 1 Date: Thursday 28 September 2000
Place	Nation	Athletes	Time	Qual.
1	Russia	Yevgeny Salakhov and Oleg Gorobiy	3:17.114	QF
2	Norway	Eirik Verås Larsen and Nils Olav Fjeldheim	3:17.288	QF
3	Poland	Marek Twardowski and Adam Wysocki	3:18.026	QF
4	Denmark	Paw Madsen and Jesper Staal	3:18.206	
5	Great Britain	Paul Darby-Dowman and Ross Sabberton	3:19.826	
6	Brazil	Sebastián Cuattrin and Carlos Campos	3:22.496	
7	Israel	Rami Zur and Ro'l Yellin	3:22.634	
8	Australia	Brian Morton and Luke Young	3:25.046	
	Czech Republic	Jan Souček and Jan Andrlik	DISQ	

The Czech Republic's reason for disqualification was not disclosed in the official report.

=== Final ===
Heat 1 of 1 Date: Saturday 30 September 2000
Place	Nation	Athletes	Time
1st place, gold medalist(s)	Italy	Antonio Rossi and Beniamino Bonomi	3:14.461
2nd place, silver medalist(s)	Sweden	Markus Oscarsson and Henrik Nilsson	3:16.075
3rd place, bronze medalist(s)	Hungary	Krisztián Bártfai and Krisztián Veréb	3:16.357
4	Germany	Andreas Ihle and Olaf Winter	3:16.627
5	France	Bâbak Amir-Tahmasseb and Philippe Aubertin	3:17.635
6	Slovakia	Juraj Bača and Michal Riszdorfer	3:18.325
7	Russia	Yevgeny Salakhov and Oleg Gorobiy	3:18.937
8	Poland	Marek Twardowski and Adam Wysocki	3:19.939
9	Norway	Eirik Verås Larsen and Nils Olav Fjeldheim	3:20.515

Beniamino Bonomi was so excited after winning the gold that he fell overboard after saluting the Italian team.
