= List of Bulgarian inventors and discoverers =

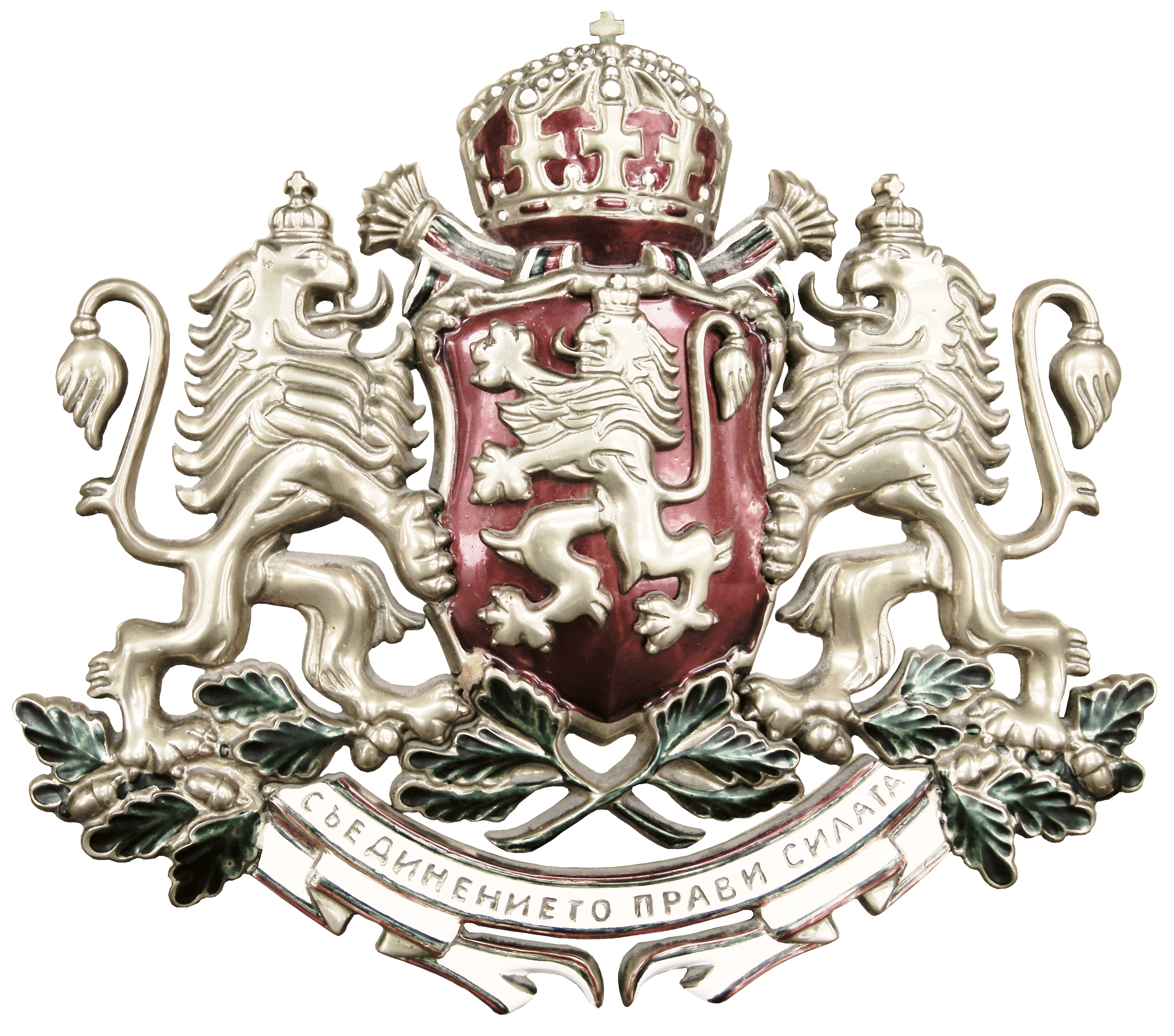
Bulgaria – Coat of Arms "Unity Makes Strength"

This is a list of Bulgarian inventors and discoverers, working locally or overseas, and also a list of Bulgarian inventions and creations. The list comprises people from Bulgaria and also people of predominantly Bulgarian heritage.

== Art and architecture ==
- Early Renaissance of the Tărnovo Artistic School – the world famous frescos in the Boyana Church from 1239 AD have been described by Andre Grabar and many scholars, as Early Renaissance or precursors of Renaissance Art well before this period started in Italy. The murals are work of the unknown Boyana Master and his disciples who are believed to have been representatives of the Tarnovo Artistic School of the Second Bulgarian Empire (1185–1396 AD). The frescos have been compared to the work of Giotto who is generally considered the first in a line of great artists who contributed to the Italian Renaissance. The Boyana Church has been declared by UNESCO a World Heritage Site.
- Architecture of the Tarnovo Artistic School – characteristic for the Second Bulgarian Empire, influenced the architecture in many countries of Southeast Europe and parts of Central Europe.

== Medicine and pharmacology ==
- Stamen Grigorov – discovered Lactobacillus bulgaricus, patented bacteria used for the production of yogurt in 1905. The bacterium feeds on lactose to produce lactic acid, which is used to preserve milk. He also made a major contribution to the creation of an anti-tuberculosis vaccine.
- Dimitar Paskov – created the medicine Nivalin, used for the treatment of mild to moderate Alzheimer's disease and various other memory impairments, in particular those of vascular origin.
- Samuel Refetoff – discovered the Refetoff syndrome, resistance to thyrotropin (RTSH) and the inherited defect that affects the metabolism of thyroid hormones through mutations in SECISBP2 gene.
- Ivan Mitev – discovered the sixth heart sound.

== Literature and education ==
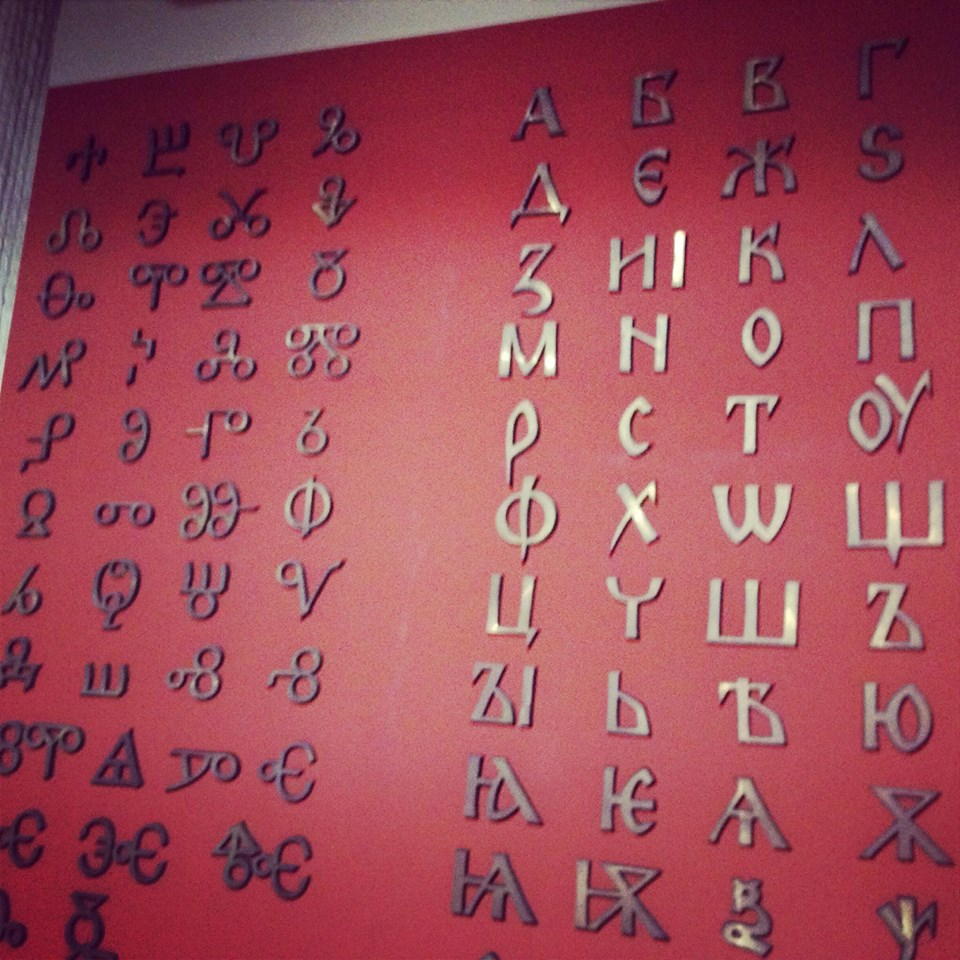
The Cyrillic Alphabet created in the Pliska-Preslav Literary School, used by most Slavic people (right). Its predecessor – the Glagolitic alphabet by Sts. Cyril and Methodius (left).

One of the 366 miniatures of the Tetraevangelia of Ivan Alexander (1355–1356) – one of the most famous works of the Tarnovo Literary School

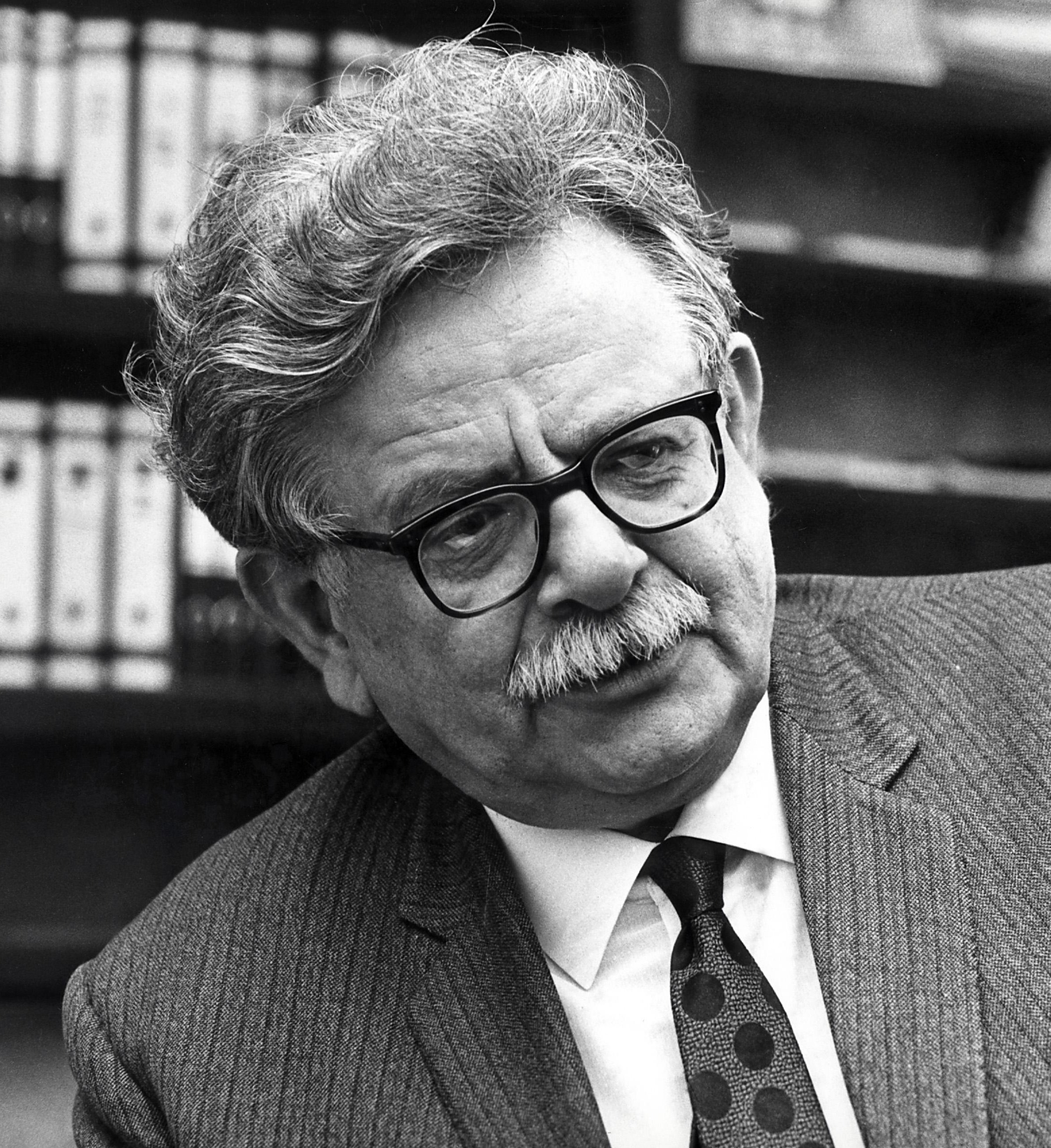
Elias Canetti, Nobel laureate in Literature (1981)

- The Early Cyrillic script created in the Pliska-Preslav Literary School in the 9th century. The Bulgarian scholars and writers, as St. Clement of Ohrid and St. Naum of Preslav, were among the most prominent and close disciples of Saints Cyril and Methodius and among the creators not only of the first Slavic alphabet – the Glagolitic (not officially used nowadays), but also of the new Bulgarian Cyrillic alphabet, named after their teacher and mentor Saint Cyril. This alphabetic writing system is nowadays employed across Southeast and Eastern Europe, also in North and Central Asia. This is the major Bulgarian contribution to the European civilization produced during the Golden Age of Bulgaria during the First Bulgarian Empire, the period of the Bulgarian cultural prosperity during the reign of emperor Simeon I the Great (889–927).
- The Tarnovo Literary School of the late 14th and 15th century was a major medieval Bulgarian cultural academy with important contribution to the Medieval Bulgarian literature established in the capital of Bulgaria Tarnovo. With the orthographic reform of Saint Evtimiy of Tarnovo and prominent representatives such as Gregory Tsamblak or Constantine of Kostenets. It was part of the Tarnovo School of Art which was characteristic for the culture of the Second Bulgarian Empire. The school influenced Russian, Serbian, Wallachian and Moldavian medieval culture. That is famous in Russia as the second South-Slavic influence.
- Georgi Lozanov – the teaching method Suggestopedia, a portmanteau of "suggestions" and "pedagogy" used to learn foreign languages, was first developed in the 1970s and utilize positive suggestions in teaching language. In 1978, the psychiatrist Lozanov presented the method to a commission in Paris at UNESCO.
- Elias Canetti – Nobel laureate in Literature 1981 "for writings marked by a broad outlook, a wealth of ideas and artistic power"

== Technology and aviation ==
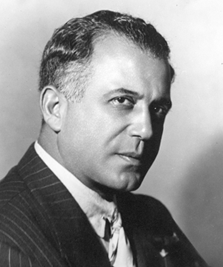
Assen Jordanoff, inventor, engineer, and aviator-pioneer

- The first technologically processed gold and oldest gold treasure and gold jewelry in the world, dating from 4,600 BC to 4,200 BC, was discovered at Varna Necropolis.
- The first Ferris wheels, the "Pleasure wheels" from Plovdiv, whose passengers rode in chairs suspended from large wooden rings turned by strong men, may have originated in 17th-century Bulgaria.
- Simeon Petrov – Captain Simeon Petrov, Bulgarian Air Force, invented the world's first purpose-built air-to-surface bomb in 1912. The innovations included aerodynamically stabilized x-tail and an impact detonator. The majority of aircraft bombs to date follow Petrov's design. The Bulgarian Air Force deployed the original prototype, thus becoming the first military force in the world to conduct tactical airplane bombing in a full-scale war in 1912.
- Assen Jordanoff (September 2, 1896 – October 19, 1967) was a Bulgarian inventor, engineer, and aviator. Jordanoff is considered to be the founder of aeronautical engineering in Bulgaria, as well as a contributor to the development of aviation in the United States. Inventor of:
  - the Airbag for aircraft pilots that is nowadays used in automobiles;
  - the Jordaphone – the predecessor of the modern Answering machine and Tape recorder;
  - the Frozen Gasoline System for airplanes;
  - the Reverse thrust device for jet engines.
- John Vincent Atanasoff (October 4, 1903 – June 15, 1995) was a physicist and inventor of Bulgarian origin, best known for being credited with inventing the first electronic digital computer.
- Peter Petroff (21 October 1919 – 27 February 2003) was a Bulgarian inventor, engineer, NASA scientist, and adventurer. He was involved in the NASA space program. Among his many accomplishments, Petroff assisted in development of one of the earliest computerized pollution monitoring system and telemetry devices for early weather and communications satellites. Petroff helped develop components of one of the world's first digital watches and an early wireless heart monitor, and many other important devices and methods.
- Ivan (John) Notchev – Bulgarian aviation engineer and invertor of the jet engines of the Eagle lunar module. They provide the smooth landing of the module with the cosmonauts, and then their successful return and docking with the spacecraft waiting for them in orbit.
- Angel Balevski (4 March 1910 – 15 September 1997) – famous Bulgarian inventor and engineer who developed, together with Ivan Dimov, a counter-pressure casting method which was a novelty in world foundry technology and was protected by over 100 patent documents in Bulgaria and abroad.
- Roumen Antonov – invented a revolutionary continuously variable transmission, which was never produced.

== Science ==
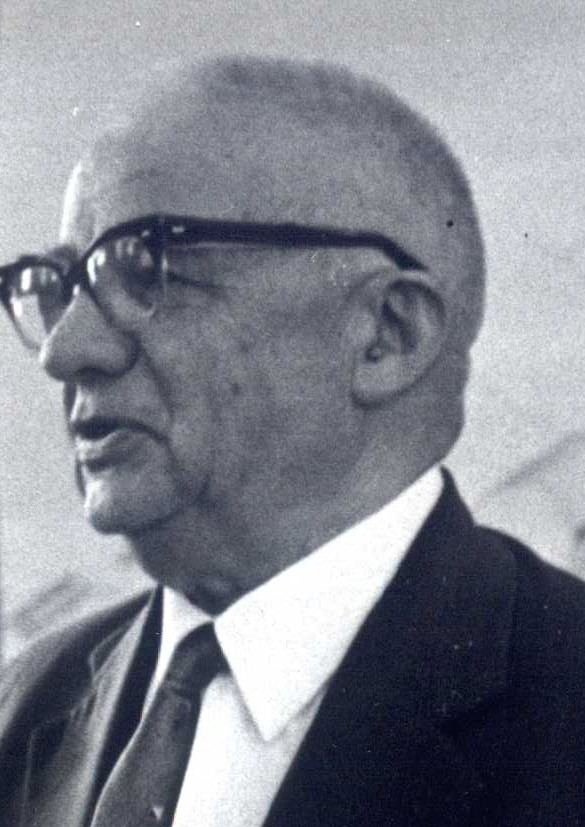
Prof. Georgi Nadjakov discovered the photoelectrets.

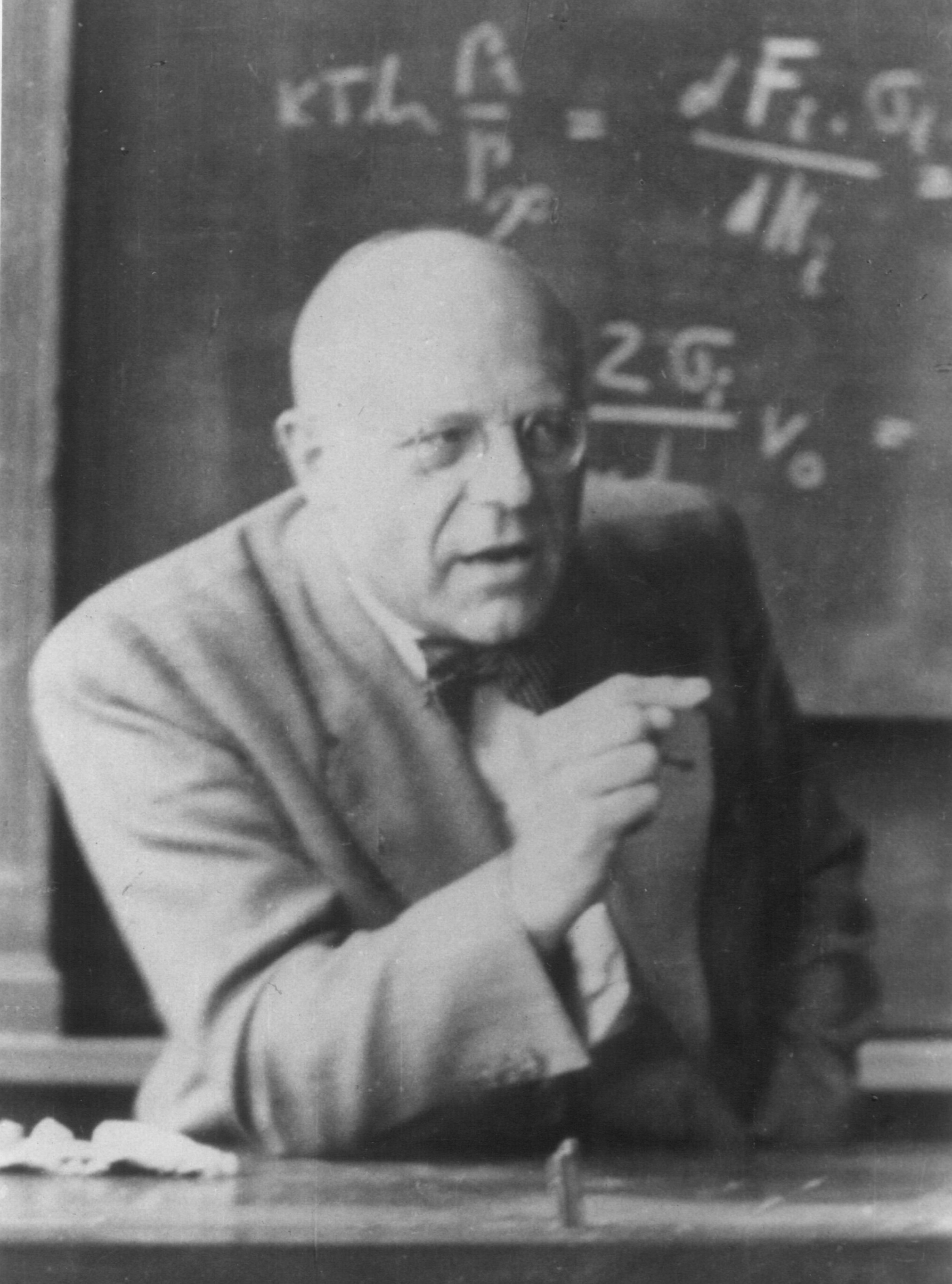
Prof. Ivan Stranski, the father of the kinetic theory of crystal growth (1940)

- Georgi Nadjakov – discovered the photoelectret state essential to modern photocopying.
- Ivan Stranski – Prof. Stranski is considered the father of the kinetic theory of crystal growth research. The Stranski-Krastanov growth and the Kossel-Stranski model have been named after him.
- Dimitar Ivanov Popov – Ivanov reaction is the chemical reaction of the dianions (endiolates) of aryl acetic acids (Ivanov reagents) with electrophiles, primarily carbonyl compounds or isocyanates.
- Dimitar Sasselov – in 2002 sighted the farthest planet from the Earth discovered until then – OGLE-TR-56b.
- Boicho Kokinov – DUAL (cognitive architecture).

== See also ==
- List of Bulgarian inventions and creations
