= Dimitar Ivanov =

Dimitar Ivanov may refer to:

- Dimitar Ivanov Stoyanov (1878–1949), Bulgarian writer Elin Pelin
- Dimitar Ivanov Popov (1894–1975), Bulgarian organic chemist
- Dimitar Ivanov (footballer, born 1970), Bulgarian footballer and manager
- Dimitar Ivanov (canoeist) (born 1975), Bulgarian sprint canoer
