= Norenberg =

Norenberg may refer to:

- Ińsko (German: Nörenberg), a town in Poland.
- Lynn Barry (née Norenberg), a former assistant director of United States women's basketball and former adviser to the Women's National Basketball Association.
- Jacob Norenberg, a Norwegian sprint canoer.
