= Tropinesterase =

Class of enzymes

Identifiers
- EC no.: 3.1.1.10
- CAS no.: 59536-71-9

Databases
- BRENDA: enzyme data
- ExPASy: NiceZyme view
- KEGG: enzyme entry
- MetaCyc: metabolic pathway
- Rhea: reactions
- PDB structures: RCSB PDB PDBe PDBsum
- Gene Ontology: AmiGO / QuickGO
Search
- PMC: articles
- PubMed: articles
- NCBI: proteins

Tropinesterase (EC 3.1.1.10) is an enzyme that catalyzes the reaction

atropine
H_{2}O
tropine
+
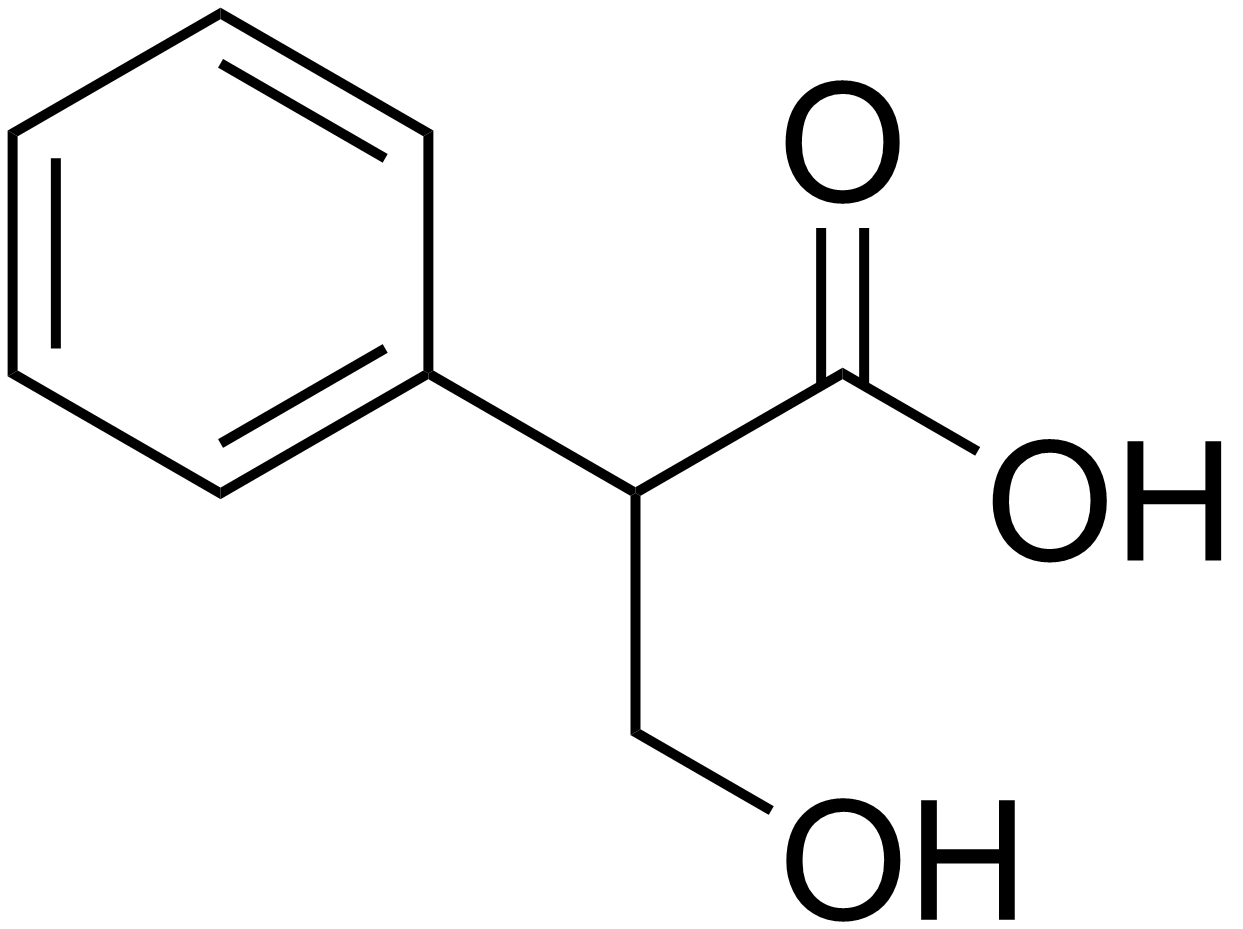
tropic acid

The enzyme first characterised from rabbit liver hydrolyses the alkaloid, atropine into tropine and tropic acid. the enzyme has also been found in the plant Duboisia myoporoides.

This enzyme belongs to the family of hydrolases, specifically those acting on carboxylic ester bonds. The systematic name is atropine acylhydrolase. Other names in common use include tropine esterase, atropinase, and atropine esterase.

== In animals ==
Plasma atropinesterase exhibits high enantiospecific activity only in some rabbits; in the remaining individuals, as well as in dogs, goats, guinea pigs, pigs, rhesus macaques, and humans, only background hydrolysis of an unknown substrate is recorded.
