= Hernanz =

Hernanz (Spanish pronunciation: [eɾˈnanθ]) is a Spanish surname. Notable people with the surname include:

- Javier Hernanz (born 1983), Spanish sprint canoeist
- Javier Martí Hernanz (born 1992), Spanish tennis player
- Samuel Hernanz (born 1986), French-born Spanish slalom canoeist
