= Adam van Koeverden =

Canadian kayaker and politician (born 1982)

The Honourable Adam van Koeverden PC MP
- Van Koeverden in 2026

Secretary of State (Sport)
- Incumbent
- Assumed office May 13, 2025
- Prime Minister: Mark Carney
- Preceded by: Terry Duguid

Member of Parliament for Burlington North—Milton West Milton (2019–2025)
- Incumbent
- Assumed office October 21, 2019
- Preceded by: Lisa Raitt

Personal details
- Born: Adam Joseph van Koeverden; January 29, 1982 (age 44) Toronto, Ontario, Canada
- Party: Liberal
- Education: McMaster University (BSc)
- Sports career
- Height: 5 ft 11 in (180 cm)
- Weight: 190 lb (86 kg)
- Sport: Kayaking
- Events: K-1 1000m, K-1 500m
- Club: Burloak Canoe Club
Medal record
Men's canoeing
Representing Canada
Olympic Games
Gold medal – first place	2004 Athens	K-1 500 m
Silver medal – second place	2008 Beijing	K-1 500 m
Silver medal – second place	2012 London	K-1 1000 m
Bronze medal – third place	2004 Athens	K-1 1000 m
World Championships
Gold medal – first place	2007 Duisburg	K-1 500 m
Gold medal – first place	2011 Szeged	K-1 1000 m
Silver medal – second place	2003 Gainesville	K-1 1000 m
Silver medal – second place	2005 Zagreb	K-1 1000 m
Silver medal – second place	2007 Duisburg	K-1 1000 m
Bronze medal – third place	2005 Zagreb	K-1 500 m
Bronze medal – third place	2009 Dartmouth	K-1 1000 m
Bronze medal – third place	2010 Poznań	K-1 500 m
Pan American Games
Bronze medal – third place	2015 Toronto	K-1 1000 m

Adam Joseph van Koeverden PC MP (born January 29, 1982) is a Canadian sprint kayaker, Olympic gold medallist, and politician serving since 2025 as the Secretary of State for Sport in the 30th Canadian Ministry. A member of the Liberal Party, he has represented the electoral district of Burlington North-Milton West and its predecessor district of Milton in the House of Commons since 2019.

He is an Olympic gold medallist in the K-1 500m category (2004) and a two-time world champion in K-1 500 (2007) and K-1 1000 (2011), winning four Olympic and eight world championship medals. His home club is the Burloak Canoe Club in Oakville, Ontario.

== Early life and education ==
He was born in Toronto to a Dutch father, Joe van Koeverden, and a Hungarian mother, Beata Bokrossy. Van Koeverden attended St. John Catholic Elementary School in Oakville, Ontario, graduating in 1996. He then proceeded to go to St. Ignatius of Loyola Catholic Secondary School also located in Oakville. He plays guitar.

Van Koeverden is a graduate of McMaster University's Bachelor of Science Kinesiology program in Hamilton, Ontario. He graduated in June 2007 as valedictorian of his class.

== Athletic career ==
He won a bronze medal in the K-1 1000 m at the 1999 world junior championships in Zagreb, Croatia, and then became world junior marathon champion in 2000. His first success as a senior came with a silver medal at the 2003 world championships in Gainesville, Georgia, in the men's K-1 1000 m event. At the 2004 Summer Olympics Van Koeverden won two medals, including a gold in the K-1 500 m and a bronze in the K-1 1000 m. He was Canada's flag bearer at the closing ceremonies and was later awarded the Lou Marsh Trophy as Canada's top athlete of 2004.

In 2005, Van Koeverden won two medals at the 2005 ICF Canoe Sprint World Championships in Zagreb: a silver in the K-1 1000 m and a bronze in the K-1 500 m. At the 2006 ICF Canoe Sprint World Championships in Szeged, Hungary, Van Koeverden finished fourth in both the K-1 500 m and 1000 m finals. At the 2006 Canadian Sprint Canoe Championships in Regina, Saskatchewan, he won five gold medals (K-1 1000 m, K-2 1000 m, K-4 1000 m, K-4 200 m, and War Canoe), and two silver medals (K-1 200 m and K-2 200 m).

Van Koeverden had great success on the World Cup circuit in 2007, going undefeated over both 500 m and 1000 m in three competitions. At the 2007 ICF Canoe Sprint World Championships in Duisburg, Van Koeverden won the gold medal in the K-1 500 m and the silver medal in the K-1 1000 m.

Van Koeverden beat his own world record in the K-1 500 m at the 2008 Beijing Olympics with a time of 1:35.554. He finished eighth place in the 1000m race, and finished with a silver medal in the K-1 500 m race. Originally, he had been listed as bronze medalist, until the scoreboard was corrected to indicate he had finished second. Van Koeverden had led most of the way from the start but was overtaken by the Australian winner Ken Wallace at the finish line, with British bronze medallist Tim Brabants ending in a photo finish with him.

In the leadup to the 2008 Beijing Olympics, Van Koeverden was named flag bearer for the Canadian Olympic team at the opening ceremony, making him one of the few athletes to carry Canada's flag twice at the Olympics. To celebrate the success of the hometown hero, on October 17, 2008, Oakville Mayor Rob Burton and local councillors hosted a meet and greet session. A ceremonial street name unveiling to honour Van Koeverden preceded the event. Adam van Koeverden Street, which is currently known as Water Street, is located near his Oakville harbour home club, the Burloak Canoe Club.

At the 2009 world championships in Dartmouth, he won a bronze medal in the K-1 1000 m event. The following year, he won another bronze, only this time it was in the K-1 500 m event. Continuing to build on these achievements at the world's, Van Koeverden went to the 2011 world championships competing in the K-1 1000 m, where he finally won gold.

At the 2012 London Olympics he won the silver medal in the same event, while Norwegian Eirik Verås Larsen won gold. At the 2016 Rio Olympics he finished first in the B final, placing ninth overall.

In 2022, Van Koeverden was awarded the Order of Sport, marking his induction into Canada's Sports Hall of Fame.

== Political career ==
On October 4, 2018, Van Koeverden announced he would be seeking the nomination of the Liberal Party of Canada in the riding of Milton to be a candidate in the 2019 Canadian federal election. Van Koeverden won the Liberal nomination on January 20, 2019, and won the Liberal seat in Milton on October 21, 2019, defeating the incumbent, Conservative Party deputy leader Lisa Raitt, taking over 51% of the vote to Raitt's 36%.

In the 2021 federal election, Van Koeverden received over 51% of the vote defeating challenger Nadeem Akbar who carried just over 33% of the vote.

In 2022, following the Russian invasion of Ukraine, Van Koeverden was one of the 313 Canadians banned from entering Russia because of his support for Ukraine.

Van Koeverden served as the Parliamentary Secretary to the Minister of Environment and Climate Change and to the Minister of Sport and Physical Activity from 2023 to 2025.

During the 2025 Canadian federal election, Van Koeverden secured the Liberal Party nomination for the newly-formed riding of Burlington North-Milton West, and was elected as Member of Parliament for Burlington North-Milton West winning over 50% of the vote. He defeated Conservative candidate Nadeem Akbar by roughly 6000 votes. Following the election, Van Koeverden was named Secretary of State for Sport.

In March 2026, the International Olympic Committee announced that it would reintroduce sex testing for the female category, to which van Koeverden said that "going back in time 30 years, to a time when (gender verification testing) was commonplace, will be harmful to sport, and specifically women's participation in sport."

== Electoral record ==
2025 Canadian federal election: Burlington North—Milton West
Party	Candidate	Votes	%	±%	Expenditures
Liberal	Adam Van Koeverden	37,155	52.75	+4.86	
Conservative	Nadeem Akbar	31,172	44.25	+7.65	
New Democratic	Naveed Ahmed	1,507	2.14	–7.46	
People's	Charles Zach	607	0.86	–3.10	
Total valid votes/expense limit		70,441	99.48		
Total rejected ballots		366	0.52		
Turnout		70,807	74.45		
Eligible voters		95,109			
Liberal hold		Swing		–1.40	
Source: Elections Canada

2021 Canadian federal election
Party	Candidate	Votes	%	±%
Liberal	Adam van Koeverden	28,503	51.5	-0.2
Conservative	Nadeem Akbar	18,313	33.1	-3.0
New Democratic	Muhammad Riaz Sahi	4,925	8.9	+2.4
People's	Shibli Haddad	2,365	4.3	+3.3
Green	Chris Kowalchuk	1,280	2.3	-2.3
Total valid votes		55,386	99.4	
Total rejected ballots		325	0.6	
Turnout		55,711	62.6	
Eligible voters		88,998		
Liberal hold		Swing		-0.2
Source: Elections Canada

2019 Canadian federal election: Milton
Party	Candidate	Votes	%	±%	Expenditures
Liberal	Adam van Koeverden	30,882	51.70	+11.26	$109,480.90
Conservative	Lisa Raitt	21,564	36.10	-9.28	$79,176.58
New Democratic	Farina Hassan	3,851	6.50	-4.38	none listed
Green	Eleanor Hayward	2,769	4.60	+2.31	$11,179.13
People's	Percy Dastur	613	1.00	-	none listed
Total valid votes/expense limit		59,679	100.0		
Total rejected ballots		379			
Turnout		60,058	70.81		
Eligible voters		84,806			
Liberal gain from Conservative		Swing		+10.27	
Source: Elections Canada

== See also ==
- List of Canadian sports personalities

Sporting positions
Preceded by Knut Holmann	Olympic Gold; Men's K-1 500m sprint Kayaking; 2004	Succeeded by Ken Wallace
Preceded by Tim Brabants	Olympic Bronze; Men's K-1 1000m sprint Kayaking; 2004	Succeeded by Ken Wallace
Preceded by Nathan Baggaley	Olympic Silver; Men's K-1 500m sprint Kayaking; 2008	Succeeded by Event discontinued
Records
Preceded by	K-1 500m Men; World Record; 1:36.2	Succeeded by Adam van Koeverden
Preceded by Adam van Koeverden	K-1 500m Men; World Record; 1:35.630	Succeeded by Adam van Koeverden
Preceded by Adam van Koeverden	K-1 500m Men; World Record; 1:35.554	Succeeded by current
