= Canoeing at the 2004 Summer Olympics – Men's K-2 1000 metres =

These are the results of the men's K-2 1000 metres competition in canoeing at the 2004 Summer Olympics. The K-2 event is raced by two-man canoe sprint kayaks.

== Medalists ==
Gold	Silver	Bronze
Markus Oscarsson and Henrik Nilsson (SWE)	Antonio Rossi and Beniamino Bonomi (ITA)	Eirik Verås Larsen and Nils Olav Fjeldheim (NOR)

== Heats ==
The 16 teams first raced in two heats. The top 3 teams in each heat advanced directly to the final, and the next nine fastest teams advanced to the semifinal, eliminating one team. The heats were raced on August 23.

Heat	Place	Athlete	Country	Time	Notes
1	1	Markus Oscarsson and Henrik Nilsson	Sweden	3:09.536	QF
1	2	Ben Fouhy and Steven Ferguson	New Zealand	3:10.388	QF
1	3	Daniel Collins and David Rhodes	Australia	3:11.272	QF
1	4	Javier Hernanz and Pablo Banos	Spain	3:12.216	QS
1	5	Zoltán Benkő and István Beé	Hungary	3:13.340	QS
1	6	Antonio Rossi and Beniamino Bonomi	Italy	3:14.060	QS
1	7	Jeffrey Smoke and Andrew Bussey	United States	3:17.268	QS
1	8	Anatoli Tishchenko and Vladimir Grushikhin	Russia	3:22.332	QS
2	1	Eirik Verås Larsen and Nils Olav Fjeldheim	Norway	3:09.247	QF
2	2	Ian Wynne and Paul Darby Dowman	Great Britain	3:10.819	QF
2	3	Jan Schäfer and Marco Herszel	Germany	3:11.627	QF
2	4	Wouter D'Haene and Bob Maesen	Belgium	3:14.447	QS
2	5	Lasse Nielsen and Mads Kongsgaard Madsen	Denmark	3:19.171	QS
2	6	Ognjen Filipović and Dragan Zorić	Serbia and Montenegro	3:19.299	QS
2	7	Yin Yijun and Wang Lei	China	3:21.279	QS
2	8	Danila Turchin and Michail Tarasov	Uzbekistan	3:24.031	

== Semifinal ==
The top three teams in the semifinal qualified for the final, joining the six teams that qualified directly from the heats. The other six teams were eliminated from the competition. The semifinal was raced on August 25.

1.	Wouter D'Haene and Bob Maesen (BEL)	3:11.757	QF
2.	Antonio Rossi and Beniamino Bonomi (ITA)	3:12.597	QF
3.	Zoltán Benkő and István Beé (HUN)	3:13.609	QF
4.	Javier Hernanz and Pablo Banos (ESP)	3:13.701
5.	Anatoli Tishchenko and Vladimir Grushikhin (RUS)	3:14.089
6.	Lasse Nielsen and Mads Kongsgaard Madsen (DEN)	3:15.417
7.	Jeffrey Smoke and Andrew Bussey (USA)	3:16.341
8.	Ognjen Filipović and Dragan Zorić (SCG)	3:58.793
	Yin Yijun and Wang Lei (CHN)	DSQ

China, competing in Lane 1, was disqualified for competing too close to the buoy line from the 950 meter mark to the finish.

== Final ==
The final was raced on August 27.

Gold	Markus Oscarsson and Henrik Nilsson (SWE)	3:18.420
Silver	Antonio Rossi and Beniamino Bonomi (ITA)	3:19.484
Bronze	Eirik Verås Larsen and Nils Olav Fjeldheim (NOR)	3:19.528
4.	Daniel Collins and David Rhodes (AUS)	3:19.956
5.	Wouter D'Haene and Bob Maesen (BEL)	3:20.196
6.	Jan Schäfer and Marco Herszel (GER)	3:20.548
7.	Ian Wynne and Paul Darby Dowman (GBR)	3:20.848
8.	Ben Fouhy and Steven Ferguson (NZL)	3:21.336
9.	Zoltán Benkő and István Beé (HUN)	3:27.996
