= Wefald =

Wefald is a surname. Notable people with the surname include:

- Alexander Wefald (born 1978), Norwegian sprint canoer
- Jon Wefald (born 1937), American university president
- Knud Wefald (1869–1936), American politician
- Robert Wefald (born 1942), American judge
- Susan Wefald (born 1947), American politician
