= Canoeing at the 2004 Summer Olympics – Men's K-1 500 metres =

These are the results of the men's K-1 500 metres competition in canoeing at the 2004 Summer Olympics. The K-1 event is raced by single-man canoe sprint kayaks.

== Medalists ==
Gold	Silver	Bronze
Adam van Koeverden (CAN)	Nathan Baggaley (AUS)	Ian Wynne (GBR)

== Heats ==
The 28 competitors first raced in three heats for position in one of three semifinal races. As there are 9 lanes on the course, 27 of 28 kayakers moved on. The heats were raced on August 24.

Heat	Place	Athlete	Country	Time	Notes
1	1	Eirik Verås Larsen	Norway	1:36.905	QS
1	2	Nathan Baggaley	Australia	1:37.997	QS
1	3	Bâbak Amir-Tahmasseb	France	1:39.401	QS
1	4	Michael Kolganov	Israel	1:39.745	QS
1	5	Kimmo Latvamaki	Finland	1:40.645	QS
1	6	Anders Gustafsson	Sweden	1:40.689	QS
1	7	Andrey Shkiotov	Russia	1:40.809	QS
2	1	Ian Wynne	Great Britain	1:37.341	QS
2	2	Ákos Vereckei	Hungary	1:37.589	QS
2	3	Petar Merkov	Bulgaria	1:38.725	QS
2	4	Andrea Facchin	Italy	1:40.025	QS
2	5	Carlos Pérez	Spain	1:40.149	QS
2	6	Anton Ryahov	Uzbekistan	1:42.253	QS
2	7	Liu Haitao	China	1:43.337	QS
3	1	Adam van Koeverden	Canada	1:37.591	QS
3	2	Javier Correa	Argentina	1:38.675	QS
3	3	Lutz Altepost	Germany	1:38.859	QS
3	4	Emanuel Silva	Portugal	1:40.067	QS
3	5	Sebastian Cuattrin	Brazil	1:40.999	QS
3	6	Martin Chorváth	Slovakia	1:42.383	QS
3	7	Simon Faeh	Switzerland	1:42.415	QS
4	1	Alan van Coller	South Africa	1:40.089	QS
4	2	Rami Zur	United States	1:40.349	QS
4	3	Alvydas Duonėla	Lithuania	1:40.365	QS
4	4	Paweł Baumann	Poland	1:42.581	QS
4	5	Apostolos Papandreou	Greece	1:44.217	QS
4	6	Tony Lespoir	Seychelles	2:02.669	QS
4	7	Steven Ferguson	New Zealand	2:06.937	

== Semifinals ==
The top three finishers in each of the three semifinals qualified for the final. Fourth place and higher competitors were eliminated. The semifinals were raced on August 26.

Semifinal 1
1.	Eirik Verås Larsen (NOR)	1:38.361	QF
2.	Ákos Vereckei (HUN)	1:38.737	QF
3.	Javier Correa (ARG)	1:39.525	QF
4.	Alvydas Duonėla (LTU)	1:40.253
5.	Anton Ryahov (UZB)	1:40.737
6.	Kimmo Latvamaki (FIN)	1:40.753
7.	Andrey Shkiotov (RUS)	1:40.765
8.	Sebastian Cuattrin (BRA)	1:42.213
9.	Paweł Baumann (POL)	1:43.125
Semifinal 2
1.	Ian Wynne (GBR)	1:38.911	QF
2.	Lutz Altepost (GER)	1:39.643	QF
3.	Bâbak Amir-Tahmasseb (FRA)	1:40.467	QF
4.	Rami Zur (USA)	1:40.727
5.	Simon Faeh (SUI)	1:41.039
6.	Carlos Pérez (ESP)	1:41.335
7.	Emanuel Silva (POR)	1:43.051
8.	Michael Kolganov (ISR)	1:43.411
9.	Tony Lespoir (SEY)	2:04.975
Semifinal 3
1.	Adam van Koeverden (CAN)	1:38.907	QF
2.	Nathan Baggaley (AUS)	1:39.031	QF
3.	Andrea Facchin (ITA)	1:40.387	QF
4.	Alan van Coller (RSA)	1:41.131
5.	Anders Gustafsson (SWE)	1:41.291
6.	Petar Merkov (BUL)	1:42.207
7.	Martin Chorváth (SVK)	1:43.095
8.	Liu Haitao (CHN)	1:46.179
9.	Apostolos Papandreou (GRE)	1:46.627

== Final ==
The final was raced on August 28.

Gold	Adam van Koeverden (CAN)	1:37.919
Silver	Nathan Baggaley (AUS)	1:38.467
Bronze	Ian Wynne (GBR)	1:38.547
4.	Eirik Verås Larsen (NOR)	1:38.667
5.	Ákos Vereckei (HUN)	1:39.315
6.	Lutz Altepost (GER)	1:39.647
7.	Bâbak Amir-Tahmasseb (FRA)	1:40.187
8.	Javier Correa (ARG)	1:40.639
9.	Andrea Facchin (ITA)	1:41.575
