= Benjie Lewis =

American canoeist

Benjamin "Benjie" Lewis (born October 11, 1982 in Miami) is an American sprint canoer who competed in the mid-2000s. At the 2004 Summer Olympics in Athens, he was eliminated in the semifinals of the K-1 1000 m event.

He won a silver medal in the K2 1000 m event at the 2003 Pan American Games.

== See also ==
- World Fit
