= Jernej Župančič Regent =

Slovenian sprint canoer (born 1980)

Jernej Župančič Regent (born May 18, 1980 in Žusterna, Koper) is a Slovenian sprint canoer who has competed since the mid-2000s. At the 2004 Summer Olympics in Athens, he was eliminated in the semifinals of the K-1 1000 m event. Four years later in Beijing, he was eliminated in the semifinals of the same event.
