= Apostolos Papandreou =

Greek canoeist (born 1975)

Apostolos Papandreou (Greek: Απόστολος Παπανδρέου) (born November 10, 1975, in Athens) is a Greek sprint canoer who competed in the mid-2000s. At the 2004 Summer Olympics in Athens, he was eliminated in the semifinals of the K-1 500 m event and the heats of the K-1 1000 m event.
