= Pablo Banos =

Spanish canoeist

Pablo Baños (born December 4, 1982) is a Spanish sprint canoer who competed in the mid-2000s. At the 2004 Summer Olympics, he was eliminated in the semifinals of the K-2 1000 m event where he performed with Javier Hernanz.
