= Wouter D'Haene =

Belgian canoeist

Medal record

Men's canoe sprint

World Championships
Silver medal – second place	2003 Gainesville	K-2 1000 m

Wouter D'Haene (born 5 May 1982 in Kortrijk) is a Belgian canoe sprinter who competed in the mid-2000s. He won a silver medal in the K-2 1000 m event at the 2003 ICF Canoe Sprint World Championships in Gainesville.

D'Haene also finished fifth in the K-2 1000 m event at the 2004 Summer Olympics in Athens. In 2005 he finished fourth in the K2 1000m on the world Championship in Zagreb and on the ninth position in Szeged 2006. After 2007 he started paddling in the K1. He reached the final on the European Championship 2008 in Milan, finished as seventh and was qualified for the Olympics in Beijing. He Could not compete because the Belgian Olympic Federation didn't participate. In 2009 he was sixth on the Europeans in Brandenburg on the K1 1000m.
