= Jan Souček =

Czech sprint canoer (born 1978)

Medal record

Men's canoe sprint

World Championships
Bronze medal – third place	2010 Poznań	K-4 1000 m

Jan Souček (born 20 November 1978) is a Czech sprint canoer who competed in the early 2000s. He won a bronze medal in the K-4 1000 m event at the 2010 ICF Canoe Sprint World Championships in Poznań.

At the 2000 Summer Olympics in Sydney, Souček was disqualified in the semifinals of the K-2 1000 m event.
