= Andrew Bussey =

American sprint canoer

Andrew "Andy" Bussey (born February 5, 1979, in Norfolk, Virginia) is an American sprint canoer who competed in the mid-2000s. At the 2004 Summer Olympics, he was eliminated in the semifinals of the K-2 1000 m event.
