= Burlington North—Milton West =

Federal electoral district in Ontario, Canada

Ontario electoral district
- Interactive map of riding boundaries from the 2025 federal election

Federal electoral district
- Legislature: House of Commons
MP
Adam van Koeverden
Liberal
- District created: 2023
- First contested: 2025
- District webpage: profile, map

Demographics
- Population (2021): 125,575
- Electors (2025): 93,767
- Census division: Halton
- Census subdivision(s): Burlington (part), Milton (part)

Burlington North—Milton West (French: Burlington-Nord—Milton-Ouest) is an electoral district in Ontario, Canada. It was created in 2023 from that part of Milton west of Regional Road 25, and that part of Oakville North—Burlington in the City of Burlington.

== Geography ==
Burlington North—Milton West consists of a portion of the City of Burlington and the Town of Milton defined by specific boundary lines. In Burlington, the area lies northwest of a route beginning at Kerns Road and Dundas Street, extending along Dundas Street to Highway 407, then south to Guelph Line. It continues southeast to Upper Middle Road, northeast to Walkers Line, southeast to the Queen Elizabeth Way, and northeast to Burloak Drive at the city’s edge. In Milton, the area lies southwest of a boundary starting at Lower Base Line West and Regional Road 25, running northwest along Regional Road 25 and Ontario Street to Steeles Avenue East, then southwest to Martin Street, and northwest again to 5 Side Road.

== Demographics ==
According to the 2021 Canadian census

Languages: 68.1% English, 6.3% Urdu, 3.4% Arabic, 2.0% Spanish, 1.9% Punjabi, 1.9% French, 1.6% Mandarin, 1.2% Polish, 1.2% Portuguese, 1.1% Tagalog

Religions: 51.7% Christian (28.6% Catholic, 3.6% Anglican, 3.1% Christian Orthodox, 3.1% United Church, 1.7% Presbyterian, 1.1% Pentecostal, 10.5% Other), 23.3% No religion, 16.2% Muslim, 5.1% Hindu, 2.4% Sikh

Median income: $50,400 (2020)

Average income: $68,900 (2020)

Panethnic groups in Burlington North—Milton West (2021)
Panethnic group	2021	
Panethnic group	Pop.	%
European (Note: Statistic includes all persons that did not make up part of a visible minority or an indigenous identity.)	69,155	55.83%
South Asian	25,900	20.91%
Middle Eastern (Note: Statistic includes total responses of "West Asian" and "Arab" under visible minority section on census.)	7,225	5.83%
East Asian (Note: Statistic includes total responses of "Chinese", "Korean", and "Japanese" under visible minority section on census.)	5,415	4.37%
African	5,320	4.3%
Southeast Asian (Note: Statistic includes total responses of "Filipino" and "Southeast Asian" under visible minority section on census.)	4,215	3.4%
Latin American	2,760	2.23%
Indigenous	1,110	0.9%
Other/multiracial (Note: Statistic includes total responses of "Visible minority, n.i.e." and "Multiple visible minorities" under visible minority section on census.)	2,765	2.23%
Total responses	123,860	98.63%
Total population	125,575	100%
Notes: Totals greater than 100% due to multiple origin responses. Demographics based on 2022 Canadian federal electoral redistribution riding boundaries.

== History ==
Parliament	Years	Member	Party
Burlington North—Milton West; Riding created from Milton and Oakville North—Burlington
45th	2025–present	Adam van Koeverden	Liberal

== Electoral results ==
2025 Canadian federal election
Party	Candidate	Votes	%	±%	Expenditures
Liberal	Adam Van Koeverden	37,155	52.75	+4.86	
Conservative	Nadeem Akbar	31,172	44.25	+7.65	
New Democratic	Naveed Ahmed	1,507	2.14	–7.46	
People's	Charles Zach	607	0.86	–3.10	
Total valid votes/expense limit		70,441	99.48		
Total rejected ballots		366	0.52		
Turnout		70,807	74.45		
Eligible voters		95,109			
Liberal hold		Swing		–1.40	
Source: Elections Canada

2021 federal election redistributed results
Party	Vote	%
Liberal	26,645	47.89
Conservative	20,361	36.60
New Democratic	5,342	9.60
People's	2,205	3.96
Green	1,082	1.94

== See also ==
- List of Canadian electoral districts
