= Bob Maesen =

Belgian canoeist

Medal record

Men's canoe sprint

World Championships
Silver medal – second place	2003 Gainesville	K-2 1000 m

Bob Maesen (Neerpelt, 24 May 1976) is a Belgian canoe sprinter who has competed since the late 1990s. He won a silver medal in the K-2 1000 m event at the 2003 ICF Canoe Sprint World Championships in Gainesville.

Maesen also competed in three Summer Olympics, earning his best finish of fifth in the K-2 1000 m event at Athens in 2004.
