= Jan Andrlík =

Czech canoeist (born 1977)

Jan Andrlík (born 17 May 1977 in Prague) is a Czech sprint canoeist who competed in the early 2000s. At the 2000 Summer Olympics in Sydney, he was disqualified in the semifinals of the K-2 1000 m event.
