= Romas Petrukanecas =

Lithuanian canoeist

Romualdas "Romas" Petrukanecas
Personal information
- Nationality: Lithuanian
- Born: May 16, 1973 (age 53)
- Occupations: Coach, sports administrator
- Years active: 1990s–2006 (athlete); 2005–present (coach)

Sport
- Sport: Canoe sprint
- Events: K-1 200 m, K-1 1000 m
- Retired: 2006
Medal record
Men's canoe sprint
World Championships
Bronze medal – third place	2002 Seville	K-1 200 m
European Championships
Bronze medal – third place	2002 Szeged	K-1 200 m

Romualdas "Romas" Petrukanecas (born 16 May 1973) is a Lithuanian former sprint canoeist and coach. He won a bronze medal in the K-1 200 m event at the 2002 ICF Canoe Sprint World Championships in Seville and competed at the 2004 Summer Olympics. After retiring in 2006, he worked as a coach and served as General Secretary of the Lithuanian Canoe Federation (2013–2024); as of 2026, he coaches Lithuanian youth national teams.

== Competitive career ==
Petrukanecas specialised in sprint canoe events, particularly the K-1 200 m distance. His major international achievement was a bronze medal at the 2002 ICF Canoe Sprint World Championships in Seville, and he also won the overall Canoe Sprint World Cup title in 2002.

At the 2004 Summer Olympics in Athens, he competed in the K-1 1000 m event, but was eliminated in the semifinals. He ended his competitive career in 2006.

== Coaching career ==
After ending his competitive career in 2006, Petrukanecas worked as a coach at the Lithuanian Olympic Sports Centre (2005–2013) and served as General Secretary of the Lithuanian Canoe Federation from 2013 to December 2024. He has also worked as a coach for Lithuanian national teams, including the Olympic team until late 2024, and as of February 2026 is listed as a coach for youth national teams.

As a coach, he has worked with multiple generations of Lithuanian canoeists, including Olympic medalists. His coaching methodology has been documented in Lithuanian sports encyclopedias as influential in developing sprint canoe talent in the post-2000 era. Notable results under his coaching guidance include:

=== Early period (2006–2012) ===
- 2006 European Championships, Račice: K-2 200 m (A. Duonėla / E. Balčiūnas) – silver medal
- 2008 European U23 Championships, Szeged: K-1 500 m (R. Malinauskas) – bronze medal
- 2012 European Championships, Zagreb: K-2 200 m (E. Balčiūnas / I. Navakauskas) – 4th place
- 2012 Summer Olympics, London: K-1 200 m (E. Balčiūnas) – 10th place

=== 2013–2016: Rise of new generation ===
- 2013 World Universiade, Kazan: K-1 200 m (I. Navakauskas) – gold medal
- 2014 European Championships, Brandenburg: K-2 200 m (A. Lankas / E. Ramanauskas) – silver medal
- 2015 European Championships, Račice: K-2 200 m (A. Lankas / E. Ramanauskas) – bronze medal; K-1 200 m (I. Navakauskas) – bronze medal
- 2016 Summer Olympics, Rio de Janeiro: K-2 200 m (A. Lankas / E. Ramanauskas) – bronze medal

=== 2017–2020: Consolidation ===
- 2018 World U23 Championships, Plovdiv: K-1 200 m (A. Seja) – gold medal
- 2018 European U23 Championships, Auronzo: K-1 200 m (A. Seja) – silver medal
- 2018 European Championships, Belgrade: K-1 200 m (A. Seja) – siver medal
- 2018 World Championships, Montemor-o-Velho: K-1 200 m (A. Seja) – silver medal
- 2019 European Games, Minsk: K-1 200 m (A. Seja) – 5th place

=== 2021–2024: Olympic cycle ===
- 2021 European Championships, Poznań: K-2 200 m (A. Seja / I. Navakauskas) – silver medal
- 2021 Summer Olympics, Tokyo: K-1 200 m (M. Maldonis) – 10th place
- 2022 World Championships, Halifax: K-2 500 m (M. Maldonis / A. Olijnik) – silver medal
- 2023 World Championships, Duisburg: K-1 200 m (A. Seja) – gold medal
- 2024 European Championships, Szeged: K-2 500 m (M. Maldonis / A. Olijnik) – bronze medal
- 2024 Summer Olympics, Paris: K-4 500 m (S. Maldonis / M. Maldonis / I. Navakauskas / A. Seja) – 5th place
- 2026 World U23 Championship, Halifax, Canada: K-4 500 m (V. Velebskij / T. Bartkus / T. Sukys / N. Zavackis) - 8th.
- 2026 European U23 Championship, Szeged, Hungary: K-1 200 m N. Zavackis - 7th;
- 2026 FISU World University Championship, Szeged, Hungary: K-1 200 m N. Zavackis - silver medal
