= Krisztián Veréb =

Hungarian canoeist (1977–2020)

Personal information
- Born: 26 July 1977 Miskolc, Hungary
- Died: 24 October 2020 (aged 43) Santo Domingo, Dominican Republic
Medal record
Men's canoe sprint
Olympic Games
Bronze medal – third place	2000 Sydney	K-2 1000 m
World Championships
Silver medal – second place	2001 Poznań	K-2 1000 m
Silver medal – second place	2003 Gainesville	K-4 1000 m
Bronze medal – third place	1998 Szeged	K-2 1000 m
Bronze medal – third place	2002 Seville	K-2 1000 m

Krisztián Veréb (26 July 1977 – 24 October 2020) was a Hungarian canoe sprinter who competed in the late 1990s and early 2000s. He won a bronze medal in the K-2 1000 m event at the 2000 Summer Olympics in Sydney.

Veréb also won four medals at the ICF Canoe Sprint World Championships with two silvers (K-2 1000 m: 2001, K-4 1000 m: 2003) and two bronzes (K-2 1000 m: 1998, 2002).

Veréb died in a motorcycle accident in Santo Domingo, Dominican Republic on 24 October 2020. He was 43.
