= Canoeing at the 2004 Summer Olympics – Men's K-1 1000 metres =

These are the results of the men's K-1 1000 metres competition in canoeing at the 2004 Summer Olympics. The K-1 event is raced by single-man canoe sprint kayaks.

== Medalists ==
Gold	Silver	Bronze
Eirik Verås Larsen (NOR)	Ben Fouhy (NZL)	Adam van Koeverden (CAN)

== Heats ==
The 25 competitors first raced in three heats. The top finisher in each heat moved directly to the final, and the next six finishers in each heat moved to the semifinals. The heats were raced on August 23. Tim Brabants' time of 3:24.412 was the World's fastest until 2011.

Heat	Place	Athlete	Country	Time	Notes
1	1	Ben Fouhy	New Zealand	3:26.064	QF
1	2	Roland Kökény	Hungary	3:27.904	QS
1	3	Adam Seroczyński	Poland	3:28.464	QS
1	4	Javier Correa	Argentina	3:28.492	QS
1	5	Róbert Erban	Slovakia	3:30.576	QS
1	6	Alan van Coller	South Africa	3:32.516	QS
1	7	Jernej Zupancic Regent	Slovenia	3:32.552	QS
1	8	Apostolos Papandreou	Greece	3:41.664	
1	9	Tony Lespoir	Seychelles	4:17.128	
2	1	Tim Brabants	Great Britain	3:24.412	QF
2	2	Adam van Koeverden	Canada	3:24.984	QS
2	3	Roei Yellin	Israel	3:34.036	QS
2	4	Andrey Shkiotov	Russia	3:35.708	QS
2	5	Andrea Facchin	Italy	3:36.492	QS
2	6	Simon Faeh	Switzerland	3:41.392	QS
2	7	Benjamin Lewis	United States	3:43.052	QS
2	8	Danila Turchin	Uzbekistan	3:48.140	
3	1	Eirik Verås Larsen	Norway	3:25.150	QF
3	2	Nathan Baggaley	Australia	3:29.414	QS
3	3	Emanuel Silva	Portugal	3:29.854	QS
3	4	Björn Goldschmidt	Germany	3:31.310	QS
3	5	Sebastian Cuattrin	Brazil	3:36.506	QS
3	6	Bâbak Amir-Tahmasseb	France	3:36.882	QS
3	7	Romas Petrukanecas	Lithuania	3:37.758	QS
3	8	Liu Haitao	China	3:38.522	

== Semifinals ==
The top three finishers in each of the two semifinals qualified for the final. Fourth place and higher competitors were eliminated. The semifinals were raced on August 25.

Semifinal 1
1.	Nathan Baggaley (AUS)	3:28.417	QF
2.	Björn Goldschmidt (GER)	3:29.561	QF
3.	Roei Yellin (ISR)	3:30.005	QF
4.	Adam Seroczyński (POL)	3:30.201
5.	Alan van Coller (RSA)	3:32.893
6.	Róbert Erban (SVK)	3:33.481
7.	Andrey Shkiotov (RUS)	3:35.349
8.	Simon Faeh (SUI)	3:37.569
9.	Romas Petrukanecas (LTU)	3:39.493
Semifinal 2
1.	Adam van Koeverden (CAN)	3:27.502	QF
2.	Roland Kökény (HUN)	3:29.134	QF
3.	Emanuel Silva (POR)	3:29.942	QF
4.	Javier Correa (ARG)	3:31.934
5.	Bâbak Amir-Tahmasseb (FRA)	3:32.582
6.	Jernej Zupancic Regent (SLO)	3:35.050
7.	Sebastian Cuattrin (BRA)	3:37.682
8.	Andrea Facchin (ITA)	3:39.510
9.	Benjamin Lewis (USA)	3:47.426

== Final ==
The final was raced on August 27.

Gold	Eirik Verås Larsen (NOR)	3:25.897
Silver	Ben Fouhy (NZL)	3:27.413
Bronze	Adam van Koeverden (CAN)	3:28.218
4.	Nathan Baggaley (AUS)	3:28.310
5.	Tim Brabants (GBR)	3:30.552
6.	Roland Kökény (HUN)	3:31.121
7.	Emanuel Silva (POR)	3:33.862
8.	Björn Goldschmidt (GER)	3:34.381
9.	Roei Yellin (ISR)	3:43.485
