= Lisa Raitt =

Former Canadian politician

The Honourable Lisa Raitt PC
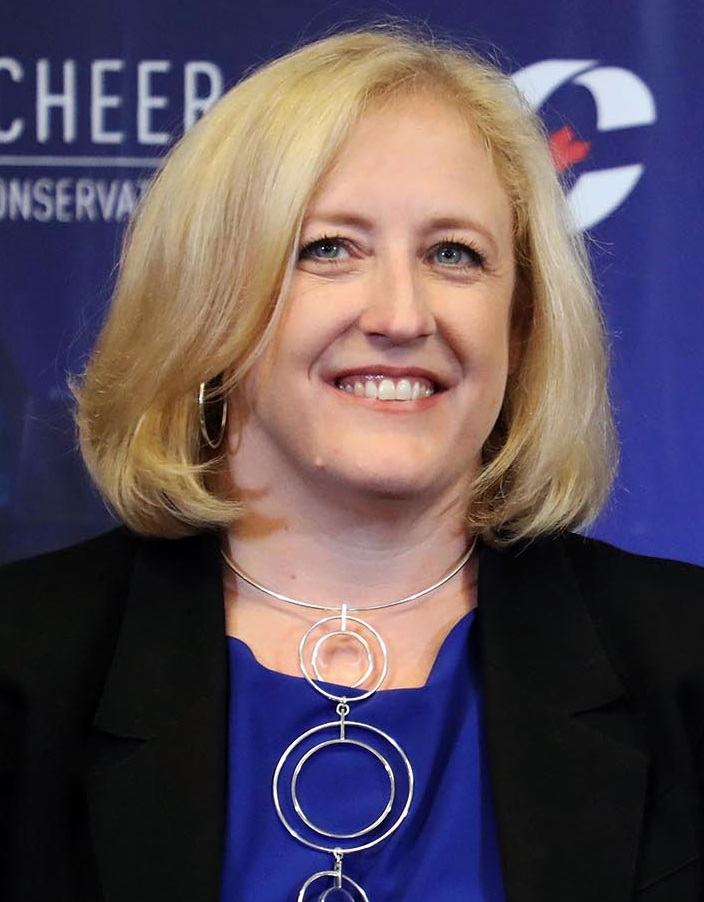
- Raitt in 2017

Deputy Leader of the Opposition
- In office July 24, 2017 – October 21, 2019
- Leader: Andrew Scheer
- Preceded by: Denis Lebel
- Succeeded by: Leona Alleslev

Deputy Leader of the Conservative Party
- In office July 20, 2017 – November 28, 2019
- President: Scott Lamb
- Leader: Andrew Scheer
- Preceded by: Denis Lebel
- Succeeded by: Leona Alleslev

Shadow Minister of Finance
- In office November 20, 2015 – October 15, 2016
- Leader: Rona Ambrose
- Shadowing: Bill Morneau
- Preceded by: Nathan Cullen
- Succeeded by: Gerard Deltell

Minister of Transport
- In office July 15, 2013 – November 4, 2015
- Prime Minister: Stephen Harper
- Preceded by: Denis Lebel
- Succeeded by: Marc Garneau

Minister of Labour
- In office January 19, 2010 – July 15, 2013
- Prime Minister: Stephen Harper
- Preceded by: Rona Ambrose
- Succeeded by: Kellie Leitch

Minister of Natural Resources
- In office October 30, 2008 – January 19, 2010
- Prime Minister: Stephen Harper
- Preceded by: Gary Lunn
- Succeeded by: Christian Paradis

Member of Parliament for Milton
- In office October 19, 2015 – September 11, 2019
- Preceded by: Riding created
- Succeeded by: Adam van Koeverden

Member of Parliament for Halton
- In office October 14, 2008 – October 19, 2015
- Preceded by: Garth Turner
- Succeeded by: Riding dissolved

Personal details
- Born: Lisa Sarah MacCormack; May 7, 1968 (age 58) Sydney, Nova Scotia, Canada
- Party: Conservative
- Spouse(s): David Raitt (m. 1990s, divorced 2009); Bruce Wood (m. 2016)
- Children: 2
- Education: St. Francis Xavier University (BSc); University of Guelph (MSc); Osgoode Hall Law School (LLB)
- Occupation: Lawyer; administrator; politician; banker

Lisa Sarah MacCormack Raitt PC (born May 7, 1968) is a former Canadian politician who served as a federal Cabinet minister and member of Parliament (MP) from 2008 to 2019. A member of the Conservative Party, Raitt was elected to the House of Commons in the 2008 election, representing Halton. Shortly after her election, Prime Minister Stephen Harper named her minister of natural resources, holding the role until 2010, when she became minister of labour. In 2013, she became minister of transport, remaining in the role until the Conservatives were defeated by the Liberal Party in the 2015 election. Raitt was re-elected in the newly formed riding of Milton. She contested the Conservative leadership in 2017, losing to Andrew Scheer, who made her deputy party leader and deputy opposition leader, a role she would hold until she was defeated in the 2019 election. Since leaving politics, she has been the vice chair of Global Investment Banking at the Canadian Imperial Bank of Commerce (CIBC).

== Early life and education ==
Lisa Sarah MacCormack was born on May 7, 1968, in Sydney, Nova Scotia, and raised as the youngest of seven children. It was not until her early teens that she learned that the couple she thought were her parents were actually her grandparents, and that the woman she believed was her sister was her mother, who as a young unmarried woman had almost given up her daughter for adoption. Her grandfather, Colin A. MacCormack, worked for a local coal mine, loading coal onto ships, and later served as city alderman, and secretary-treasurer and a lead negotiator for the Cape Breton Railway Transportation and General Workers. Her grandmother, Mary Christina "Tootsie" (Gillis), was a businesswoman.

As a child, she participated in Girl Guides of Canada programs as a youth member. She got her first taste of politics by serving in the student government at her public all-girls school, Holy Angels High School. She graduated from the school in 1985. In autumn 2010, she was one of the many powerful alumnae that attempted to save the school from closure, when the Catholic Church convent – that owned the property – wanted to sell it and the public school board did not want to purchase it. The school closed in June 2011.

Raitt graduated from St. Francis Xavier University with a Bachelor of Science degree. She went on to do a master's degree in chemistry, specializing in environmental biochemical toxicology, at the University of Guelph. Raitt completed a law degree at Osgoode Hall Law School and was called to the Ontario bar in 1998. That year, she was granted a Dr. Harold G. Fox Scholarship. As a result, she trained with barristers of the Middle Temple in London, United Kingdom, which specialized in international trade, commerce, transportation, and arbitration.

== Toronto Port Authority (1999–2008) ==
Raitt served as the Toronto Port Authority's (TPA) corporate secretary and general counsel, and was named harbourmaster in April 2001. She was the first female harbourmaster of a Canadian port. In 2002, Raitt was appointed as president and chief executive officer of the Toronto Port Authority (TPA), a federal Crown corporation that manages the Toronto Harbour as well as the Toronto City Centre Airport. She relinquished the post of harbourmaster to Angus Armstrong in 2004.

=== General counsel ===
As general counsel for the TPA, she filed a $1 billion lawsuit over 600 acres (240 ha) of land that was transferred in the 1990s to the City of Toronto's Toronto Economic Development Corporation (TEDCO) by the Toronto Harbour Commission (THC). The disputed lands, mostly the infill lands of the Don River delta, constituted around 85 per cent of the THC's land assets as of the early 1990s. The lands had been transferred in two separate agreements, in 1991 and 1994 in exchange for a permanent subsidy for the THC. The TPA's legal claim was that the transfer had been done while the majority of directors of the THC were city-appointed, and who had acted in the city's interest and not in the commission's fiduciary interest, and that the deals crippled the THC's ability to be self-sufficient by ending any potential revenues from those lands. Since the TPA was inheriting the role and activities of the THC, it was thus crippled itself. The TPA and the city settled out of court in exchange for a promised bridge to the Island Airport across the Western Gap and approximately $50 million. The bridge was never built; instead a pedestrian tunnel under the Western Gap was constructed and completed on July 30, 2015.

=== Chief executive officer ===
As chief executive officer (CEO) of the TPA, Raitt was responsible for building the International Marine Passenger Terminal, a Toronto home for the now-defunct Canadian American Transportation Systems, a Rochester, New York-based group. The ground was broken on 24 August 2004, and CATS operated for six months in 2005. The Rochester firm that initially owned the ferry had a 14-year lease on the use of the terminal that would have paid the City of Toronto $250,000 per year. The terminal was reported to have cost $10.5 million to construct, which makes a 0.33 cost recovery factor. The lease was terminated in December 2009 after payment of a $90,000 settlement. The terminal has seen little use since then except to dock cruise ships and as a movie set.

During her time as CEO of the TPA, the Air Canada Jazz service to the Toronto City Centre Airport was discontinued under a legal cloud.

Raitt was responsible for the new TCCA1 ferry for passengers at the Toronto City Centre Airport, which is located at the western end of the Toronto Islands.

Raitt was quoted as "proud to have assisted in the remarkable growth of Porter Airlines" in her time at the TPA.

==== Mismanagement allegations ====
Trinity—Spadina MP Olivia Chow called on federal Auditor General Sheila Fraser to conduct an audit of the port authority to investigate why Minister of Transport John Baird increased the membership of the board of directors from seven to nine—and why Raitt, while CEO, was allowed to run up almost $80,000 in travel and other expenses over two years. A November 2009 report by the Toronto Star claimed that Raitt signed off on her own expenses inappropriately, but the TPA claimed The Star's report was inaccurate. This followed another story in the Toronto Star that a TPA employee used the office computer to send emails about a Conservative fundraiser event. After an independent forensic review conducted by PricewaterhouseCoopers, the Toronto Port Authority released the results on September 14, 2010. These results showed that "all but one of the 15 complaints lodged by the former Directors were groundless".

== Political career ==
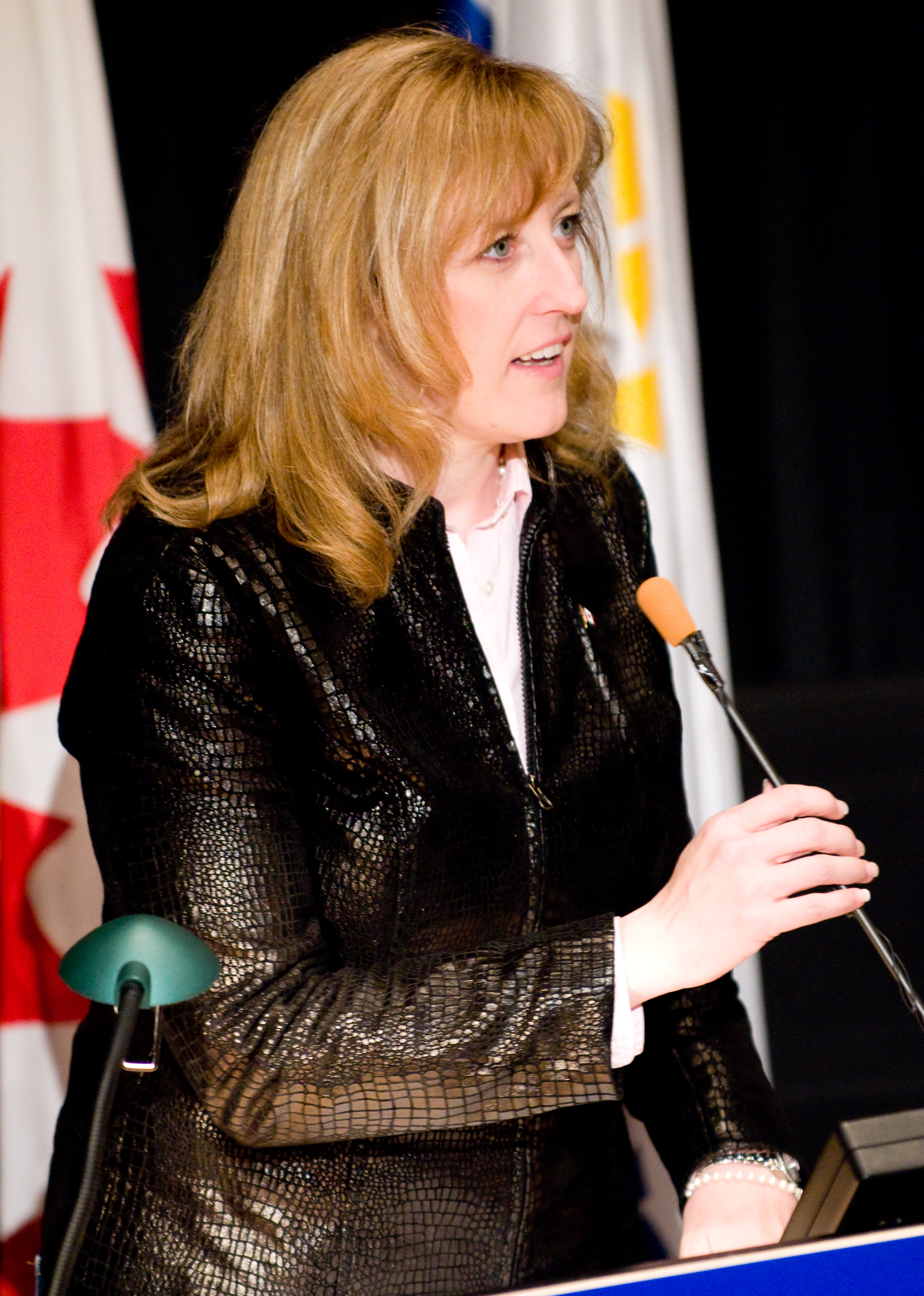
Raitt in 2009

In September 2008, Raitt was appointed to run as the Conservative candidate in Halton against Liberal incumbent Garth Turner. Turner had been elected to his term as a Conservative MP but he was suspended from the Conservative caucus in 2006. The Conservatives stated he had breached caucus confidentiality; Turner disputed this claim and suggested he was suspended for his independent positions. He later joined the Liberals after briefly sitting as an independent member. Raitt defeated Turner in the October 14, 2008, election.

=== Minister of Natural Resources ===
Raitt was named to the Cabinet of Canada by Prime Minister Stephen Harper on October 30, 2008, as Minister of Natural Resources. She was one of eleven women named to the Cabinet.

At an October 6, 2009, meeting of the Oakville, Ontario, Chamber of Commerce, Raitt was on record discussing the possibilities of increased tourism and shipping opportunities in the North due to the melting polar ice cap.

==== Audio tape incident ====
On June 2, 2009, Halifax's The Chronicle Herald reported that a folder of confidential and secret ministerial briefing documents had been left by Raitt or her staff at the CTV News Ottawa office for a week. CTV News chose to reveal the contents which listed the funding for the Chalk River nuclear reactor which had recently shut down, causing a shortage of medical radioisotopes. There was also an audio tape, made on January 30, 2009, with Raitt and the aide.

On June 3, the opposition parties demanded that the government fire Raitt or accept her resignation. Raitt claimed to have offered her resignation and that the offer was rejected by the prime minister. A ministerial aide, Raitt's 26-year-old director of communications, Jasmine MacDonnell, offered her resignation which was accepted.

On June 8, 2009, CBC News reported that a Nova Scotia court heard an argument to block the Halifax Chronicle-Herald from publishing a story about an audio recording involving Raitt. The judge ruled that the public interest over-rode the issue of confidentiality. On the tape, Raitt made comments on the radio isotope issue, describing it as "sexy ... Radioactive leaks. Cancer." and hard to control because it is "confusing to a lot of people". Raitt also made comments on the parliamentary skills of Health Minister Leona Aglukkaq.

=== Minister of Labour ===
On January 19, 2010, Raitt was shuffled from her role as minister of natural resources and named minister of labour. Prime Minister Harper publicly defended Raitt, saying she has "a great future."

The Ottawa Citizen and National Post reported Raitt's appearance at Toronto Pearson International Airport on March 22, 2012, and subsequent reaction by Air Canada baggage handlers was the reason a wildcat strike occurred the next day. According to Bill Trbovich, a spokesman for the International Association of Machinists and Aerospace Workers (IAMAW), Raitt was walking through the airport when three workers started "clapping and saying 'Oh, great job'". Raitt is alleged to have asked the Royal Canadian Mounted Police (RCMP) to 'arrest these animals'. The strike caused widespread disruption to the airline's schedule, causing flight cancellations and delays. Raitt's office denied the allegation.

In 2011, Raitt used back to work legislation twice to end strikes by Air Canada's flight attendants and by employees of Canada Post. The following year she threatened to legislate workers with the Canadian Pacific Railway back to work on the first day of their strike. On each occasion she cited the country's fragile economy as the reason for using back to work legislation.

Raitt was shuffled out as minister of labour in 2013. She received praise from both opposition critics and union leaders for her work as minister. Liberal MP Rodger Cuzner described Raitt as "tough, quick, funny and hard-working — she can give as good as she gets." Phil Benson of the Teamsters union said "she had an open door policy with us, was professional, courteous and good to deal with," and that he looked forward to working with her as Transportation Minister.

=== Minister of Transport ===
Raitt was named Minister of Transport on July 15, 2013, nine days after the Lac-Mégantic derailment. She replaced Roberval-Lac-Saint-Jean MP Denis Lebel, who was Minister of Transport, Infrastructure and Communities. With her promotion to the transportation file she was considered to be one of the most senior women in Cabinet, along with Public Works Minister Diane Finley.

Shortly after her appointment as transport minister in 2013, National Post columnist John Ivison wrote that Raitt was quickly becoming a contender to succeed Prime Minister Harper when he decided to step down.

==== Rail safety ====
On July 9, 2013, Transport Canada was in full damage control mode owing to the Lac-Mégantic derailment, with two directors, and an associate deputy minister attempting to explain the department's delayed reaction to a December 2011 auditor general report on rail safety. Raitt took over the department on July 15. She issued a directive sometime in fall 2013 requiring railways to inform municipalities about the kinds of dangerous goods they were carting through their communities, but a spokesman for Canadian National said on January 8, 2014, upon the occurrence of a hazardous derailment near Plaster Rock, New Brunswick, that it was too soon for those regulations to have come into effect. Prime Minister Harper commented during a stop in Inuvik on January 8, 2014, and said: "We have made significant investments in rail safety and rail inspections," he said. "We have increased both of those vastly."

==== Windsor Detroit Bridge Authority ====
On July 30, 2014, she appointed her long-time friend Caroline Mulroney, and three other individuals, including Mark R. McQueen, who was an employer of Mulroney (under the name Lapham) at Wellington Financial and also was a former employee of former prime minister Brian Mulroney's office, to the Windsor Detroit Bridge Authority, a body which oversees a second bridge across the Detroit River that separates Windsor, Ontario from Detroit, Michigan. New Democratic Party leader Tom Mulcair mocked Mulroney's appointment as an instance of the kind of corruption her father was suspected of. The Business News Network noted: "The Harper government hasn't explained yet what Mulroney Lapham's qualifications are to serve as a director of the Windsor-Detroit Bridge Authority."

=== In opposition ===
The Conservative government was defeated in the 2015 federal election, though Raitt was elected in Milton, essentially the western part of her old riding.

==== Leadership candidate ====
In the aftermath of the Conservative defeat, Raitt was one of several names commonly mentioned as a potential leadership candidate. Raitt had said she is "seriously considering" a bid for the party leadership.

On October 14, 2016, Raitt stepped down as finance critic. On November 2, 2016, Raitt announced via Facebook that she was running for the leadership of the Conservative Party of Canada, though she eventually lost to Andrew Scheer.

After the 2014 Ontario election, Raitt was considered to be a contender to replace Tim Hudak for the leader of the Ontario Progressive Conservative Party. However, she declined the opportunity due to health issues. In 2018, after Patrick Brown resigned over accusation of sexual assault, Raitt was named as a possible contender for the leadership, but announced on January 27, that she will not seek the leadership. She endorsed Caroline Mulroney and served as her campaign co-chair.

In a June 7, 2019 retweet of Ross McKitrick's Financial Post opinion piece defending Roger Pielke Jr. Raitt said that the "Bottom line is there's no solid connection between climate change and the major indicators of extreme weather, despite Trudeau's claims to the contrary. The continual claim of such a link is misinformation employed for political and rhetorical purposes."

==== Conservative deputy leader ====
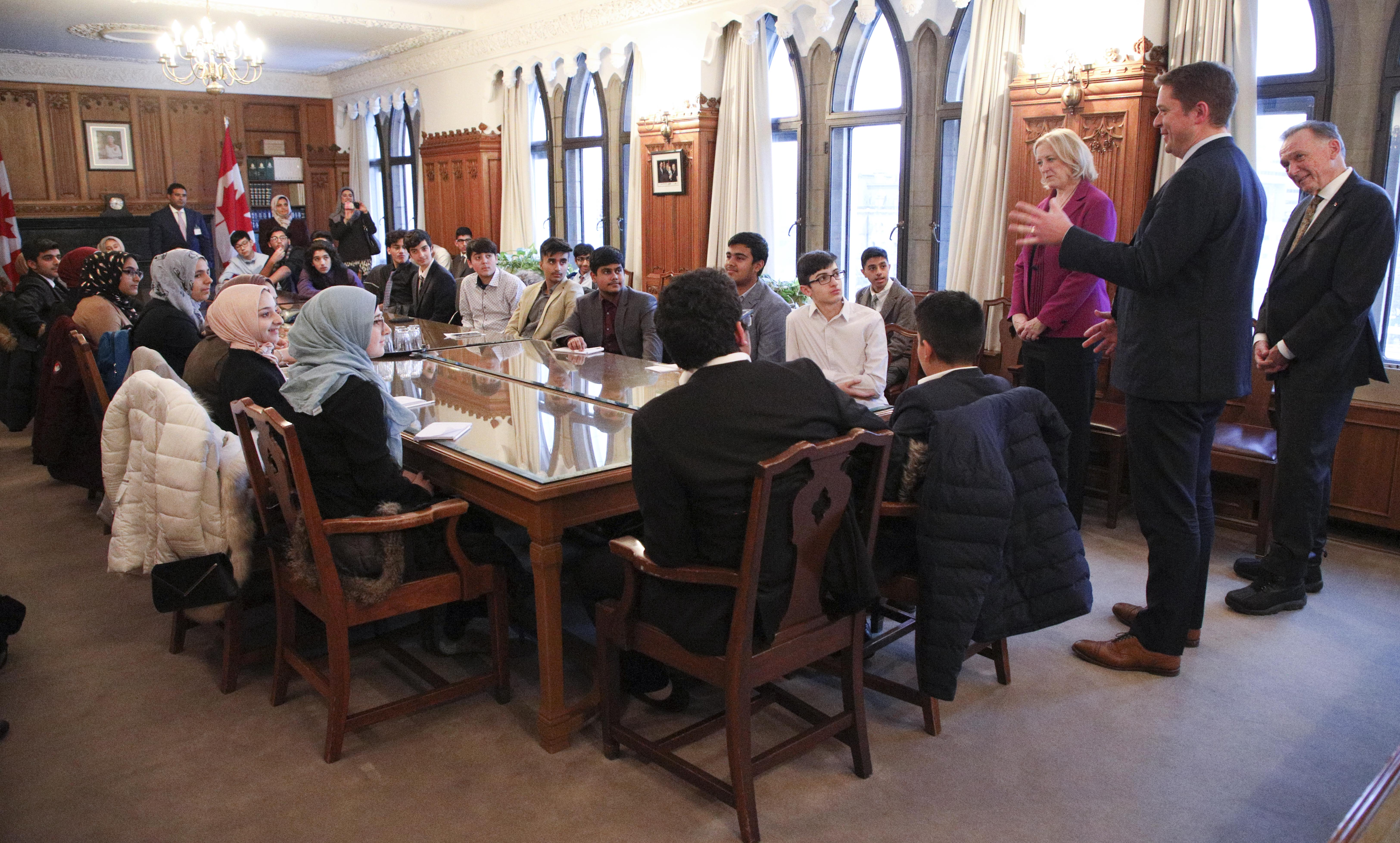
Raitt meeting students during a school trip to Parliament Hill in 2018.

On July 20, 2017, Conservative leader Andrew Scheer named Raitt as deputy leader of the Conservative Party of Canada and Official Opposition. Raitt is the first woman to hold the role for the Conservatives. When asked about the appointment, she stated she considered herself a feminist and women will 'see themselves' in her.

=== 2019 defeat and retirement ===
Raitt was defeated in the 2019 federal election by Liberal candidate Adam van Koeverden, despite the conservatives gaining seats across the country. Her defeat was considered significant as she was a front bench member of the party and the Deputy Opposition leader. She retired from politics shortly thereafter.

== Personal life ==
Raitt's first marriage was to Second City alumnus, playwright, and stay-at-home dad David Raitt. With him she, has two sons, John Colin (b. 2001) and Billy (b. 2004). By 2011 they were separated and divorced sometime later. On September 2, 2016, she married her longtime partner, Bruce Wood, the president and CEO of the Hamilton Port Authority. In November 2020, she came out about her experience with her husband's young onset Alzheimer's disease during the COVID-19 pandemic.

== Electoral record ==
2019 Canadian federal election: Milton
Party	Candidate	Votes	%	±%	Expenditures
Liberal	Adam van Koeverden	30,882	51.70	+11.26	$109,480.90
Conservative	Lisa Raitt	21,564	36.10	-9.28	$79,176.58
New Democratic	Farina Hassan	3,851	6.50	-4.38	none listed
Green	Eleanor Hayward	2,769	4.60	+2.31	$11,179.13
People's	Percy Dastur	613	1.00	-	none listed
Total valid votes/expense limit		59,679	100.0		
Total rejected ballots		379			
Turnout		60,058	70.81		
Eligible voters		84,806			
Liberal gain from Conservative		Swing		+10.27	
Source: Elections Canada

2015 Canadian federal election: Milton
Party	Candidate	Votes	%	±%	Expenditures
Conservative	Lisa Raitt	22,378	45.38	-9.67	$102,240.41
Liberal	Azim Rizvee	19,940	40.44	+16.26	$120,826.89
New Democratic	Alex Anabusi	5,366	10.88	-5.65	$6,027.16
Green	Mini Batra	1,131	2.29	-1.58	$2,700.16
Libertarian	Chris Jewell	493	1.00		$2,322.98
Total valid votes/Expense limit		49,308	100.00		$204,958.27
Total rejected ballots		210	0.42	–	
Turnout		49,518	69.01	–	
Eligible voters		71,754			
Conservative hold		Swing		-12.96	
Source: Elections Canada

2011 Canadian federal election: Halton
Party	Candidate	Votes	%	±%	Expenditures
Conservative	Lisa Raitt	44,206	54.4	+6.9	
Liberal	Connie Laurin-Bowie	20,903	25.8	-10.4	
New Democratic	Patricia Heroux	12,960	16.0	+7.2	
Green	Judi Remigio	2,778	3.4	-3.6	
Christian Heritage	Tony Rodrigues	249	0.3	-0.2	
Total valid votes		81,096	100.0		
Total rejected ballots		290	0.4	+0.1	
Turnout		81,394	62.4	+1.9	
Eligible voters		130,026	–	–	
Conservative hold		Swing		+8.65	

2008 Canadian federal election: Halton
Party	Candidate	Votes	%	±%	Expenditures
Conservative	Lisa Raitt	32,986	47.5	+3.5	$106,182
Liberal	Garth Turner	25,136	36.2	-5.2	$51,972
New Democratic	Robert Wagner	6,118	8.8	0.0	$3,421
Green	Amy Collard	4,872	7.0	+1.4	$4,509
Christian Heritage	Tony Rodrigues	337	0.5	–	$2,108
Total valid votes/Expense limit		69,449	100.0	$107,026	
Total rejected ballots		225	0.3		
Turnout		69,674	60.5		
Conservative notional hold		Swing		+4.35	
