= Milton (federal electoral district) =

Former federal electoral district in Ontario, Canada

Coordinates: 43.512°N 79.886°W

Ontario electoral district
- Milton in relation to nearby electoral districts in the Greater Toronto and Hamilton Area

Federal electoral district
- Legislature: House of Commons
- District created: 2013
- District abolished: 2023
- First contested: 2015
- Last contested: 2021
- District webpage: profile, map

Demographics
- Population (2021): 136,993
- Electors (2021): 88,998
- Area (km²): 447.36
- Census division: Halton
- Census subdivision(s): Burlington, Milton

Milton is a former federal electoral district in Ontario, Canada, that consists of the town of Milton and part of Burlington which has a population growing much faster than the Ontario average. It was created by the 2012 federal redistribution and previously part of Halton. Redistributed results showed that Conservative Lisa Raitt won the area easily in 2011, although her vote share dropped in the 2015 election and the Liberals took the riding in 2019. From 2019 to 2025, it was represented by Liberal Adam van Koeverden.

== Profile ==
The riding (electoral district) in its current form consists of the part of Burlington north of Dundas Street and Highway 407 and the town of Milton. The eponymous town, which makes up much of the riding's area, is a quickly-growing settlement which dates back to the 1820s. According to the 2016 census, the population of the riding grew over six times as much as the Ontario average between 2011 and 2016, from 88,065 to 114,093 (a 29.6% increase compared to the provincial average of 4.6%). Over a third of the riding's population are immigrants. In 2015, the median income in the riding was $42,779, up from $41,801 in 2010. The median age in the district is 36, below the Ontario average of 41.

== Demographics ==
According to the 2021 Canadian census; 2013 representation

Languages: 56.3% English, 9.4% Urdu, 4% Arabic, 2.3% Spanish, 1.8% Punjabi, 1.5% Tagalog, 1.3% Polish, 1.2% Portuguese, 1.1% French, 1.1% Hindi, 1.1% Mandarin
Religions: 48.4% Christian (27.9% Catholic, 3.1% Christian Orthodox, 2.6% Anglican, 2% United Church, 1.4% Pentecostal, 1.1% Presbyterian), 22.6% Muslim, 19.4% No religion, 5.9% Hindu, 2.4% Sikh
Median income (2020): $46,000
Average income (2020): $60,000

Ethnicity groups: White: 45.3%, South Asian: 27.6%, Black: 5.7%, Arab: 5.6%, Filipino: 3.9%, Chinese: 2.8%, Latin American: 2.5%, West Asian: 1.3%, Southeast Asian: 1%

Ethnic origins: Pakistani 11.9%, English 11.5%, Indian 10.6%, Scottish 9.6%, Irish 9.2%, Canadian 8.9%, Italian 5.8%, German 4.7%, Filipino 4%, Portuguese 3.9%

== History ==
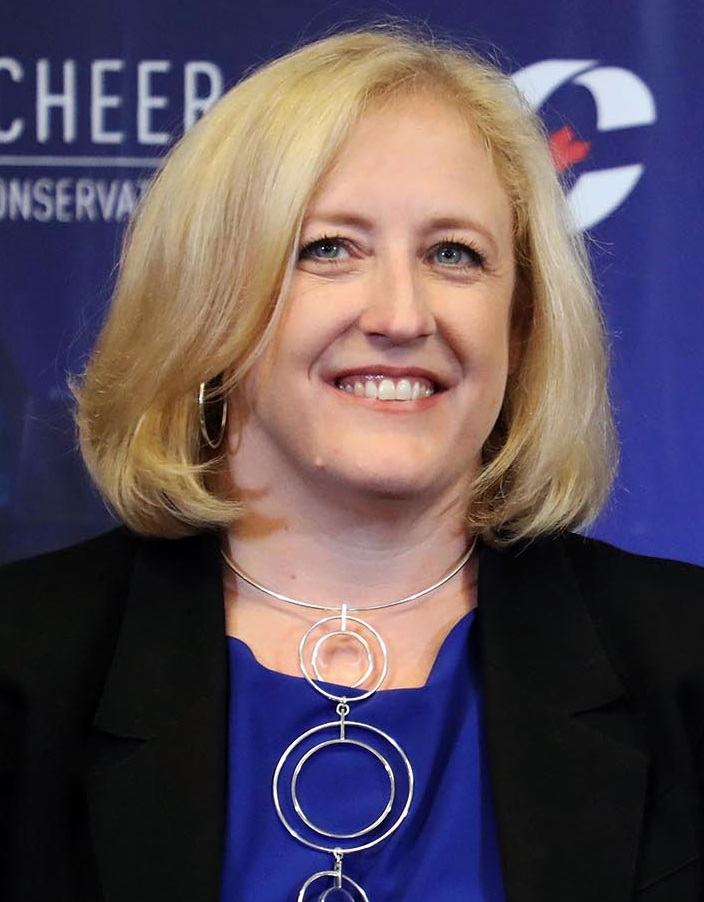
Lisa Raitt

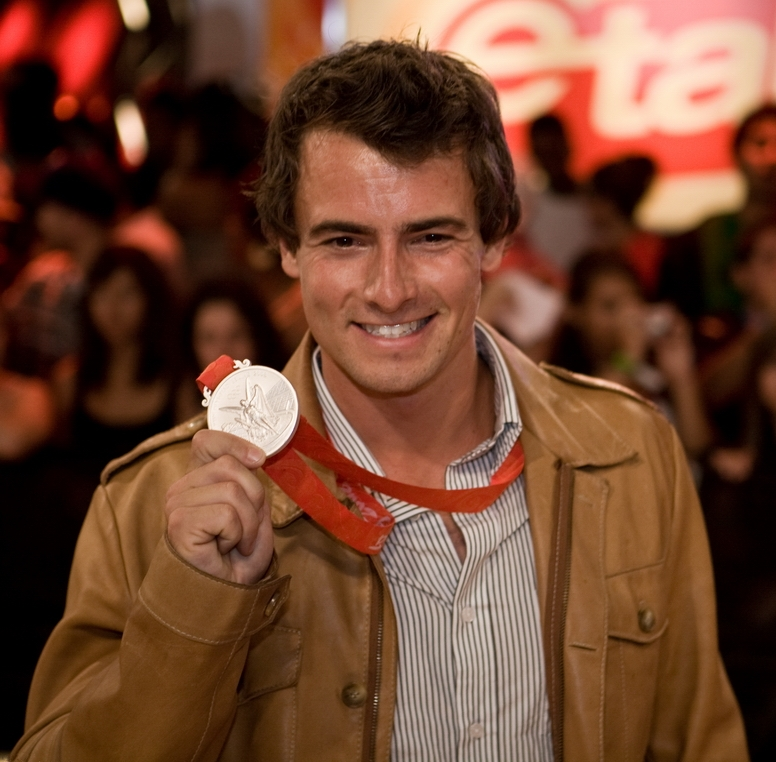
Adam van Koeverden

The district was first proposed as part of the 2012 redistribution. It was initially proposed to consist of Milton, the rural northern part of Burlington, and some small suburban areas of Burlington. There was some concern that the growth of Milton would cause it to be seriously underrepresented by 2031. Before the public meetings were scheduled to be held, the commission redrew the districts in the area and the district would now be split. Burlington North—Milton South would consist of southern Milton and a few more suburban neighbourhoods in Burlington. In the north, it would be combined with Halton Hills to form Halton Hills—Milton.

In February 2013, the district was reverted to the original proposal, but with the northern suburbs of Burlington excluded. This proposal ended up being approved. The area of this district was previously part of Halton and had a population of 88,065, 17% below the provincial average.

In the 2011 election, Conservative MP Lisa Raitt won Halton by about 29% of the vote, and when redistributed, she won Milton by 31%. In the 2015 election, her margin of victory over the Liberal candidate declined to 5%. Shortly after the election, in which the Conservatives lost government, Prime Minister Stephen Harper resigned as party leader; his interim replacement Rona Ambrose appointed Raitt to the Shadow Cabinet as Finance critic. After Raitt spent time outside of the shadow cabinet during her leadership bid, the new full-time leader Andrew Scheer appointed her to be Deputy Leader of the Conservative Party in 2017.

In January 2019, the Liberals nominated former Olympian Adam van Koeverden to run in the riding. A riding poll was released in the lead-up to the election showing a tight race, and it was expected that it would turn out that way on election night. Despite this, van Koeverden won the riding's seat in Parliament against Raitt by 15% of the vote and won a majority of votes in the riding. This was one of only two ridings in the country Liberals picked up from the Conservatives in the 2019 election. After the completion of the 2022 Canadian federal electoral redistribution process, the electoral constituency of Milton will be subdivided into two distinct districts: Burlington North-Milton West and Milton East-Halton Hills South. These changes will come into effect upon the call of the 2025 Canadian federal election.

== Members of Parliament ==
This riding has elected the following members of Parliament:

Parliament	Years	Member	Party
Milton; Riding created from Halton
42nd	2015–2019	Lisa Raitt	Conservative
43rd	2019–2021	Adam van Koeverden	Liberal
44th	2021–2025	Adam van Koeverden	Liberal
Riding dissolved into Burlington North—Milton West and Milton East—Halton Hills South

== Election results ==
View source data.
Graph of election results in Milton (minor parties that never got 2% of the vote or didn't run consistently are omitted)

2021 Canadian federal election
Party	Candidate	Votes	%	±%	Expenditures
Liberal	Adam van Koeverden	28,503	51.5	-0.2	$77,539.79
Conservative	Nadeem Akbar	18,313	33.1	-3.0	$99,542.76
New Democratic	Muhammad Riaz Sahi	4,925	8.9	+2.4	$1,399.74
People's	Shibli Haddad	2,365	4.3	+3.3	$5,677.08
Green	Chris Kowalchuk	1,280	2.3	-2.3	$0.00
Total valid votes/Expense limit		55,386	99.4	–	$117,559.81
Total rejected ballots		325	0.6		
Turnout		55,711	62.6		
Eligible voters		88,998			
Liberal hold		Swing		-0.2	
Source: Elections Canada

2019 Canadian federal election
Party	Candidate	Votes	%	±%	Expenditures
Liberal	Adam van Koeverden	30,882	51.70	+11.26	$109,480.90
Conservative	Lisa Raitt	21,564	36.10	-9.28	$79,176.58
New Democratic	Farina Hassan	3,851	6.50	-4.38	none listed
Green	Eleanor Hayward	2,769	4.60	+2.31	$11,179.13
People's	Percy Dastur	613	1.00	-	none listed
Total valid votes/expense limit		59,679	100.0		
Total rejected ballots		379			
Turnout		60,058	70.81		
Eligible voters		84,806			
Liberal gain from Conservative		Swing		+10.27	
Source: Elections Canada

2015 Canadian federal election
Party	Candidate	Votes	%	±%	Expenditures
Conservative	Lisa Raitt	22,378	45.38	-9.67	$102,240.41
Liberal	Azim Rizvee	19,940	40.44	+16.26	$120,826.89
New Democratic	Alex Anabusi	5,366	10.88	-5.65	$6,027.16
Green	Mini Batra	1,131	2.29	-1.58	$2,700.16
Libertarian	Chris Jewell	493	1.00		$2,322.98
Total valid votes/Expense limit		49,308	100.00		$204,958.27
Total rejected ballots		210	0.42	–	
Turnout		49,518	69.01	–	
Eligible voters		71,754			
Conservative hold		Swing		-12.96	
Source: Elections Canada

2011 federal election redistributed results
Party	Vote	%
Conservative	18,631	55.05
Liberal	8,183	24.18
New Democratic	5,593	16.53
Green	1,311	3.87
Others	126	0.37

== See also ==
- List of Canadian electoral districts
- Historical federal electoral districts of Canada
