= Marian Dimitrov =

Bulgarian sprint canoer (born 1972)

Marian Dimitrov (Bulgarian: Мариан Димитров) (born 11 June 1972 in Kardzhali) is a Bulgarian sprint canoer who competed in the early 2000s. At the 2000 Summer Olympics in Sydney, he was eliminated in the heats of the K-2 1000 m event.
