= David Rhodes (canoeist) =

Australian canoeist (born 1975)

David Rhodes (born 12 November 1975) is an Australian sprint canoeist. At the 2004 Summer Olympics, he finished fourth in the K-2 1000 m event.
