= Simon Faeh =

Swiss sprint canoer

Simon Faeh (sometimes listed as Simon Fäh, born 10 May 1982) is a Swiss sprint canoer who competed in the mid-2000s. At the 2004 Summer Olympics in Athens, he was eliminated in the semifinals of both the K-1 500 m and K-1 1000 m events.
