= Andrey Shkiotov =

Russian canoeist (born 1986)

Andrey Shkiotov (sometimes listed as Andrey Shkyotov, born July 25, 1986) is a Russian sprint canoer who competed in the mid-2000s. At the 2004 Summer Olympics in Athens, he was eliminated in the semifinals of both the K-1 500 m and K-1 1000 m events.
