= Luke Young (canoeist) =

Australian sprint canoeist (born 1978)

Luke Young (born 8 September 1978) is an Australian sprint canoeist who competed in the early 2000s. At the 2000 Summer Olympics in Sydney, he was eliminated in the semifinals of the K-2 1000 m even.
