= Roei Yellin =

Israeli sprint canoer (born 1981)

Roei Yellin (Hebrew: רועי ילין; born September 11, 1981) is an Israeli sprint canoer who competed in the early to mid-2000s. Competing in the 2000 Summer Olympics in Sydney and the 2004 Summer Olympics in Athens, he earned his best finish of ninth in the K-1 1000 m event at Athens.

Yellin is Jewish.
