= Javier Hernanz =

Spanish canoeist

Personal information
- Full name: Javier Hernanz Agüeira
- Nationality: Spanish
- Born: 1 February 1983 (age 43) Arriondas, Spain

Sport
- Country: Spain
- Sport: Canoe sprint
- Event: Kayaking
Medal record
Men's canoe marathon
Representing Spain
World Championships
| Bronze medal – third place | 2018 Montemor-o-Velho | K-4 500 m |
Marathon World Championships
| Silver medal – second place | 2003 Valladolid | K-2 marathon |

Javier Hernanz Agüeira (Spanish pronunciation: [xaˈβjeɾ eɾˈnanθ aˈɣwejɾa]; born 1 February 1983) is a Spanish sprint canoer and marathon canoeist. At the 2004 Summer Olympics, he was eliminated in the semifinals of the K-2 1000 m event.

In July 2015, he qualified for the 2016 Summer Olympics at K-4 1000 metres event.
