= Dimitar Ivanov (canoeist) =

Bulgarian canoeist (born 1975)

Dimitar Ivanov (Bulgarian: Димитър Иванов) (born 6 August 1975 in Kardzhali) is a Bulgarian sprint canoeist who competed in the early 2000s. At the 2000 Summer Olympics in Sydney, he was eliminated in the heats of the K-2 1000 m event.
