= Yevgeny Salakhov =

Russian canoeist

Personal information
- Born: 25 January 1979 (age 47) Yekaterinburg, Russia
- Height: 184 cm (6 ft 0 in)
- Weight: 80 kg (176 lb)

Sport
- Sport: Canoe sprint
- Club: Dynamo Omsk
- Retired: 2013
Medal record
Representing Russia
World Championships
Silver medal – second place	2011 Szeged	K-1 4×200 m
Bronze medal – third place	2010 Poznań	K-1 4×200 m

Yevgeny Aleksandrovich Salakhov (Russian: Евгений Александрович Салахов; born 25 January 1979) is a Russian former canoe sprinter. Competing in the K-1 4 × 200 m event he won a silver medal at the 2011 and a bronze at the 2010 ICF Canoe Sprint World Championships.

Salakhov also participated in the 2000, 2008 and 2012 Olympics, with the best result of fifth place in 2012. His mother is a former canoe coach. Salakhov is married to Yulia Salakhova (née Kamalova, unrelated to the Olympic canoer Yuliana Salakhova). They have a daughter Eva, and work as canoe coaches in Sysert.
