= Ian Wynne =

British sprint canoer (born 1973)

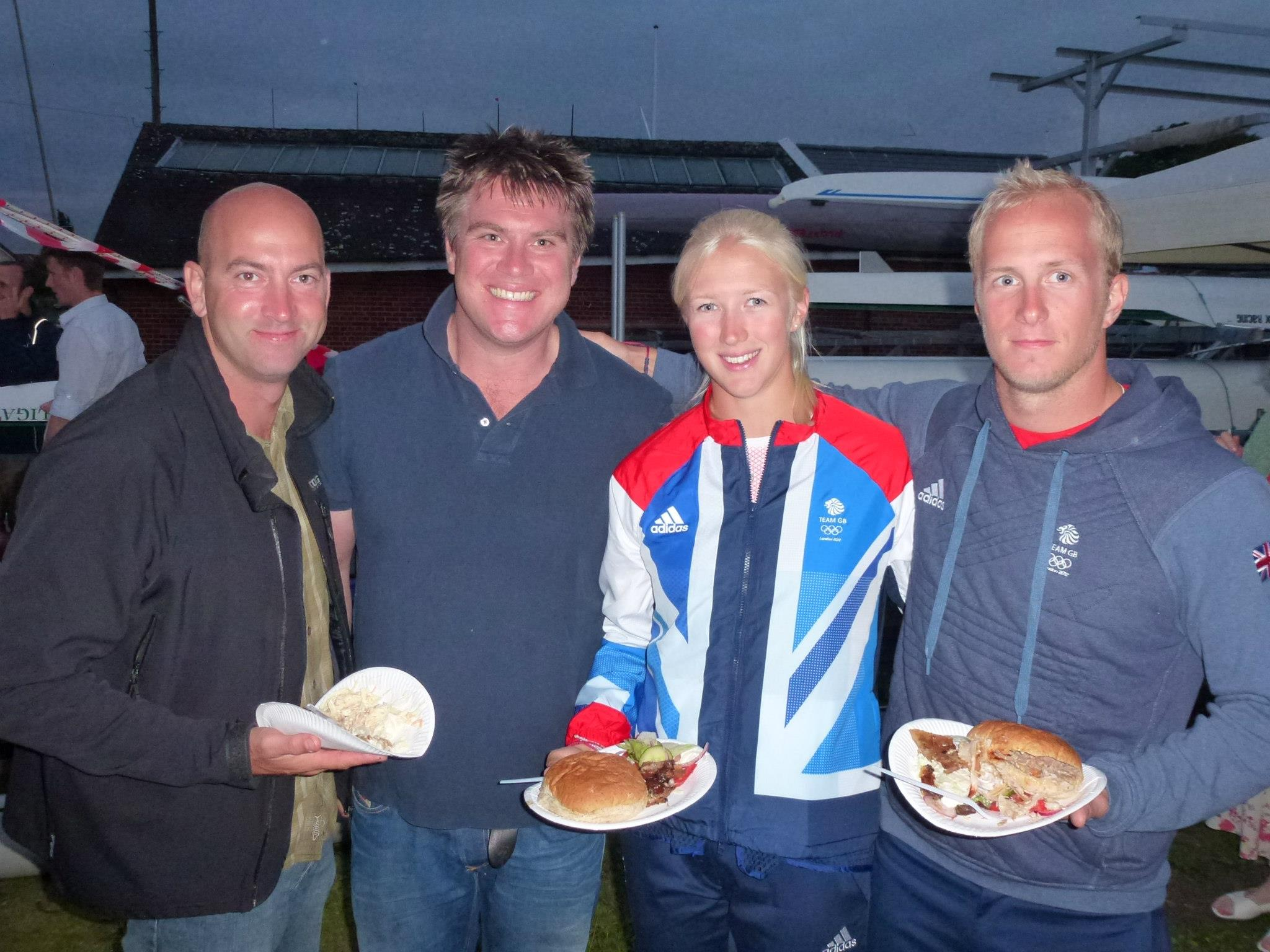
Medal record
Men's canoe sprint
Bronze medal – third place	2004 Athens	K-1 500 m

Ian Wynne (born 30 November 1973) is a British canoe sprinter who competed in the early to mid-2000s. Competing in two Summer Olympics, he won a bronze medal in the K-1 500 m event at Athens in 2004.

In the same year he won the silver medal in the same event at the European Championships at Poznań, Poland, as well as the bronze in the K-2 1000 m with partner Paul Darby-Dowman.

In 2005 he finished seventh in the K-1 500 m at the world championships in Zagreb, Croatia. In October 2007 he crossed the English Channel between Great Britain and France in a new record time of 2:59,06 hours.

Wynne, who was born in Tonbridge, is a member of the Royal Canoe Club. He is 184 cm (6 ft 0 in) tall and weighs 84 kg (185 lb). As a teenager he represented Great Britain in international swimming championships.

Ian Wynne is now the British men's 1000m team coach.
