= Samuel Refetoff =

Bulgarian-born endocrinologist and academic

- Born: June 11, 1937 (age 89); Ruse, Bulgaria
- Occupations: Endocrinologist, academic
- Known for: Discovery of Thyroid hormone resistance ("Refetoff Syndrome")
- Awards: Paul Starr Award (1991), Sidney H. Ingbar Distinguished Lectureship (1996), John B. Stanbury Medal (2005), Fred Conrad Koch Medal (2012)

Academic background
- Education: University of Montreal, McGill University

Academic work
- Institutions: University of Chicago

Samuel Refetoff (born 11 June 1937) is a Bulgarian-born endocrinologist and academic. He is the Frederick H. Rawson Professor in Medicine at the University of Chicago, where he directs the Endocrinology Laboratories. He is best known for describing Thyroid hormone resistance, a condition now also referred to as "Refetoff Syndrome".

== Early life and education ==
Refetoff was born in Ruse, Bulgaria and grew up in Belgium and Canada. He graduated from the Lycée in Antwerp in 1955, earned a B.Sc. (Honours) in Biochemistry from the University of Montreal in 1959, and obtained his M.D., C.M. from McGill University in 1963.

Following an internship at Hôpital Notre-Dame (1964–1965), he trained in internal medicine at Good Samaritan Hospital, Los Angeles (1964–1965) and at Lahey Clinic, Massachusetts (1965–1966). He completed an endocrinology fellowship at Harvard Medical School and Peter Bent Brigham Hospital from 1966 to 1968.

== Career ==
Refetoff joined the University of Chicago faculty in 1969. He served as director of the Thyroid Function Laboratory (1973–1994) and has been director of the Endocrinology Laboratories since 1994. He has also held professorships in medicine, pediatrics, and genetics. From 1978 to 1983 and 1999 to 2004, he directed the Endocrinology Training Program. In 2011, he was a Fulbright senior specialist at the Medical University of Sofia.

=== Research ===
Refetoff's work has focused on genetic disorders affecting thyroid hormone synthesis, transport, and action. He co-identified the syndrome of generalized resistance to thyroid hormone in 1967. His group has described mutations in:

- Thyroxine-binding globulin causing inherited TBG deficiency
- Albumin causing familial dysalbuminemic hyperthyroxinemia
- NKX2-1 gene affecting thyroid, brain, and lung development
- MCT8 (SLC16A2) associated with Allan–Herndon–Dudley syndrome
- SECISBP2 affecting selenoprotein synthesis and thyroid hormone metabolism.

== Awards and honours ==
- 1991 – Paul Starr Award, American Thyroid Association
- 1996 – Sidney H. Ingbar Distinguished Lectureship Award, American Thyroid Association
- 2004 – Honorary Fellow, Royal College of Physicians of Ireland
- 2005 – John B. Stanbury Thyroid Pathophysiology Medal, American Thyroid Association
- 2012 – Fred Conrad Koch Medal, Endocrine Society
- 2013 – Honorary Member, European Thyroid Association
- 2019 – Lissitzky Medal, European Thyroid Association
