= Ivanov reaction =

Chemical reaction

The Ivanov reaction is a carbon–carbon bond-forming chemical reaction involving the addition of dianions (endiolates) of aryl acetic acids (Ivanov reagents) with electrophilic substrates such as aldehydes, ketones, isocyanates, or alkyl halides, resulting in β‑hydroxy acids. The reaction was named after the Bulgarian organic chemist, Academician Dimitar Ivanov, who discovered it. Mechanistically, the Ivanov reaction proceeds via a Zimmerman–Traxler six-membered chair-like transition state, coordinating metal cations to both enolate oxygens and the electrophile, which explains its high anti‑stereoselectivity.

== History ==
The reaction was first reported by Bulgarian organic chemist, Academician Dimitar Ivanov Popov in 1931 in Bulletin Société Chimique de France, with follow-up studies in 1932 and significant reviews in 1970 and 1975.

== Mechanism ==
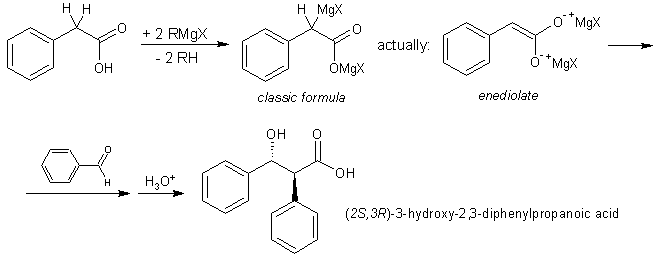
The Ivanov reaction

The reaction involves magnesium-enediolate dianions of aryl acetic acids (Ivanov reagents) attacking electrophilic substrates such as aldehydes, ketones, isocyanates, or alkyl halides, resulting in β‑hydroxy acids. The product does not usually spontaneously decarboxylate, but it is possible with some reagents. Use of the dianion of phenylacetic acid with formaldehyde gives tropic acid, an intermediate used in the synthesis of atropine and hyoscyamine.

The conformation follows the Zimmerman–Traxler cyclic transition state, coordinating metal cations to both enolate oxygens and the electrophile. It exhibits strong anti‑stereoselectivity, typically forming anti‑β‑hydroxy acids due to favorable chair transition state and steric interactions. In 1985, Toullec measured reaction rates and determined the energy profile using phenylacetic acid magnesium enediolate reacting with aldehydes/ketones. Some Ivanov adducts may undergo decarboxylation under harsh conditions. The process is sensitive to moisture and temperature; requires low temps and anhydrous environment to maintain enediolate stability.

== Applications ==
Synthesis of β-hydroxy esters → useful intermediates in medicinal chemistry.

Aldol-type reactions, but with stabilized enolates.

Precursor for β-diketones, lactones, and heterocycles.

Used in natural product synthesis for building complex skeletons.

== See also ==
- Aldol reaction
