= Tropic acid =

Names
- Preferred IUPAC name 3-Hydroxy-2-phenylpropanoic acid
- Other names 2-Phenylhydracrylic acid; Tropate

Identifiers
CAS Number	529-64-6
3D model (JSmol)	Interactive image
ChEBI	CHEBI:CHEBI:30765
ChemSpider	10274
ECHA InfoCard	100.008.201
EC Number	209-020-6
KEGG	C01456
MeSH	C011377
PubChem CID	10726
UNII	9RM4U80765
CompTox Dashboard (EPA)	DTXSID90862179
- InChI: InChI=1S/C9H10O3/c10-6-8(9(11)12)7-4-2-1-3-5-7/h1-5,8,10H,6H2,(H,11,12) Key: JACRWUWPXAESPB-UHFFFAOYSA-N; InChI=1/C9H10O3/c10-6-8(9(11)12)7-4-2-1-3-5-7/h1-5,8,10H,6H2,(H,11,12) Key: JACRWUWPXAESPB-UHFFFAOYAV
- SMILES: C1=CC=C(C=C1)C(CO)C(=O)O

Properties
Chemical formula	C_{9}H_{10}O_{3}
Molar mass	166.176 g·mol^{−1}
Melting point	116 °C (241 °F; 389 K)
- Except where otherwise noted, data are given for materials in their standard state (at 25 °C [77 °F], 100 kPa). Infobox references

Tropic acid is a chemical with IUPAC name 3-hydroxy-2-phenylpropanoic acid and condensed structural formula HOCH_{2}CHPhCOOH. It is a laboratory reagent used in the chemical synthesis of atropine and hyoscyamine. Tropic acid is a chiral substance, existing as either a racemic mixture or as a single enantiomer.

== Synthesis ==
Tropic acid can be prepared by the Ivanov reaction between phenylacetic acid and formaldehyde. In this method, the dianion of the acid is formed using a Grignard reagent, isopropyl magnesium chloride, and this reacts with the aldehyde to form the magnesium salt of the product, from which the pure acid is obtained after acidification with sulfuric acid.

Many other methods have been used to make tropic acid, for example starting from acetophenone (1).

== Uses ==
Tropic acid is used in the chemical synthesis of atropine and hyoscyamine.
