= Eirik Verås Larsen =

Norwegian sprint kayaker (born 1976)

- Eirik Verås Larsen
Medal record
Men's canoe sprint
Representing Norway
Olympic Games
Gold medal – first place	2004 Athens	K1-1000 m
Gold medal – first place	2012 London	K1-1000 m
Silver medal – second place	2008 Beijing	K1-1000 m
Bronze medal – third place	2004 Athens	K2-1000 m
World Championships
Gold medal – first place	2001 Poznań	K2-1000 m
Gold medal – first place	2002 Seville	K1-1000 m
Gold medal – first place	2005 Zagreb	K1-1000 m
Silver medal – second place	2002 Seville	K2-1000 m
Bronze medal – third place	2007 Dusiburg	K1-1000 m
Bronze medal – third place	2011 Szeged	K1-1000 m
Gold medal – first place	2001 Stockton-on-Tees	K2 marathon
Gold medal – first place	2002 Zamora	K2 marathon
European Championships
Gold medal – first place	2000 Poznań	K2-1000 m
Gold medal – first place	2001 Milano	K2-1000 m
Gold medal – first place	2004 Poznań	K1-1000 m
Gold medal – first place	2004 Poznań	K2-1000 m
Gold medal – first place	2005 Poznań	K1-1000 m
Gold medal – first place	2007 Pontevedra	K1-1000 m
Gold medal – first place	2009 Brandenburg	K2-1000 m
Silver medal – second place	2011 Belgrade	K-1 5000 m
Bronze medal – third place	2002 Szeged	K2-1000 m
Men's canoe marathon
World Championships
Gold medal – first place	2001 Stockton-on-Tees	K-2
Gold medal – first place	2002 Zamora	K-2

Eirik Verås Larsen (born 26 March 1976 in Flekkefjord) is a Norwegian sprint kayaker who has competed internationally since the early 1990s. He has participated in three Summer Olympics, and has won a complete set of medals (gold: 2004 K-1 1000 m and 2012 K-1 1000 m, silver: 2008 K-1 1000 m, bronze: 2004 K-2 1000 m).

Eirik Verås Larsen's definitive international breakthrough came when he and his companion Nils Olav Fjeldheim won the European Championship K2-1000 gold medal in 2000.

== Early career ==
Verås Larsen started kayaking at the age of 10 in Flekkefjord, a small town at the south west coast with 8000 inhabitants. Flekkefjord Kayak Club had a history of producing world champions – such as his coach Olaf Søyland who won gold medals in K4-10 000m in 1975 and in the K2-1000m in 1979.

As a young competitive athlete at the national level, Verås Larsen was never the top-ranked contender. However, he was known as being dedicated, hard working, and he was feared by many for his endurance capacity. By the end of his teenage years, his hard work started to pay off. At just 17-year-old, he surprised many by winning the bronze medal in the 1993 Nordic Marathon Junior Championship in Sweden.

In 1995, Verås Larsen moved to Oslo to train alongside Norway's best paddlers. For several years, he trained in the group led by Knut Holman, the dominant force in the men's K1-1000 meter throughout the 1990s, boasting three olympic gold medals and five times world championship titles.

== International breakthrough ==
Eirik Verås Larsen's definitive international breakthrough came when he and his companion Nils Olav Fjeldheim won the European Championship K2-1000 gold medal in 2000 in Poznań, Poland. The achievement resulted in a wild-card from the International Canoe Federation for participation in the Sydney Olympics the same year, where they placed 9th on K2-1000.

== The golden years – European-, World Champion ==
In 2001, Verås Larsen won his first World Champion gold medal. He and Nils Olav Fjeldheim were superior to the other teams in the K2-1000 final in Poznań, Poland. From 2002, he went for combining K1-1000 and K2-1000. Although the K2 continued to perform very well, it was his K1 achievements that would dominate the coming years of his career. He won World Champion Gold medals in K1-1000 in 2002 and 2005.

In 2006, he was not in top shape and won no international titles. His best results were 5th on K1-500 in the European Championships, and 6th on K1-1000 in the World Championships. This wake-up call may well have turned out to sharpen his focus towards the 2008 Olympics for which he was a clear gold candidate. After a disappointing 2006 he was back on track in 2007 and won the Gold medal on K1-1000 at the European Championships, and he finished 3rd in the World Championships later the same year.

Before the 2009 season, Verås Larsen decided to go for K2 with Jacob Norenberg, and did not race internationally in K1. Together they won the 2009 European Championships at K2-1000 in Germany and finished 5th in the World Championships in Halifax later the same year. Verås Larsen held the individual (K-1) 1000m world record of 3:24.920 (Duisburg 2004) until it was bettered by Ben Fouhy of New Zealand (Poznań 2006) with the time of 3:24.495 (backwind of 2 m/s).

== Olympic Champion ==
The number one milestone of his career came in the 2004 Summer Olympics in Athens. Over a few years he had tried to combine K2-1000m, K1-1000m and K1-500m. This was a major challenge as the event racing times were very close in the championship time schedules. In Athens he won gold medal in K1-1000, followed by an impressive bronze medal in K2-1000 one hour later. He also finished 4th at K1-500.

There was some uncertainty around his fitness level in the 2008 Summer Olympics in Beijing. Since 2005 his best result in the World Championships was 3rd in 2007. He came to Beijing with a 6th place in K2-1000 (with Mattis Næss) as his best result from the European Championships, not having participated in K1-1000. In Beijing he won a silver medal at K1-1000 meter only beaten by Tim Brabants (GBR), and claimed that he was very happy as he had done his best race since 2004. He completed a great season by finishing 4th in the Olympic K1-500. He earned his second gold of Olympics in 2012 London Olympics in Canoe Sprint's Kayak Single (K1) 1000m event.

== Marathon canoeing ==
In 2001 and 2002 Verås Larsen won the K2 marathon World Championships together with his companion Nils Olav Fjeldheim.

== Step down and comeback ==
After the 2009 season Verås Larsen decided that he would not race in 2010. He had attained his goals with several gold medals in both the Olympics and in World Championships, and needed time to decide whether he would go for another Olympics.

On 18 August 2010 a Norwegian newspaper broke the news that Verås Larsen was ready for a comeback, aiming for another gold medal at the 2012 Summer Olympics in London.

In his first international World Cup competition in the comeback season 2011 he finished 2nd on K1-1000m (Poznań, Poland).

== Personal life ==
In 2011 he married Mira Verås Larsen, who also competed as a kayaker in the 2012 Olympics.

== Education ==
Eirik Verås Larsen holds a MSc in biomechanics from the Norwegian School of Sport Sciences.
