= Mattis Næss =

Norwegian canoeist

Medal record

Men's canoe sprint

World Championships
Bronze medal – third place	2005 Zagreb	K-2 1000 m

Mattis Næss (born 18 May 1973) is a Norwegian sprint canoer who competed from the mid-1990s to the mid-2000s (decade).

== Biography ==
He won a bronze medal in the K-2 1000 m event at the 2005 ICF Canoe Sprint World Championships in Zagreb.

Næss also competed in two Summer Olympics, earning his best finish of fifth in the K-4 1000 m event at Athens in 2004.

As of 2011, Mattis Næss is a teacher in science and mathematics. He teaches the subjects R1, T, science and P.
