= Dimitar Ivanov Popov =

Bulgarian chemist (1894–1975)

Dimitar Ivanov
- Born: October 13, 1894; Makotsevo, Bulgaria
- Died: October 25, 1975 (aged 81); Sofia, Bulgaria
- Education: L'Université de Lyon, France
- Known for: Ivanov Reaction
- Scientific career
- Fields: Organic Chemistry, Chemistry of Natural Products, Organic Synthesis
- Workplaces: University of Sofia, Faculty of Chemistry

Dimitar Ivanov Popov (Bulgarian: Димитър Иванов Попов) (October 13, 1894 – October 25, 1975) was a Bulgarian organic chemist and an academician of the Bulgarian Academy of Sciences.

Prof. D. Ivanov is known by his father's name Ivanov rather than his family's name Popov.

He is the namesake of the Ivanov reaction in chemistry.
