= Alexander Wefald =

Norwegian canoeist (born 1978)

Alexander Wefald (born 25 November 1978 in Oslo) is a Norwegian sprint canoer who competed in the mid-2000s. He finished fifth in the K-4 1000 m event at the 2004 Summer Olympics in Athens.
