= Nils Olav Fjeldheim =

Norwegian canoeist

Medal record

Representing Norway

Men's canoe sprint

Olympic Games
Bronze medal – third place	2004 Athens	K-2 1000 m

World Championships
Gold medal – first place	2001 Poznań	K-2 1000 m
Silver medal – second place	2002 Seville	K-2 1000 m
Bronze medal – third place	1998 Szeged	K-4 200 m

European Championships
Gold medal – first place	2000 Poznań	K-2 1000 m
Gold medal – first place	2001 Milano	K-2 1000 m
Gold medal – first place	2004 Poznań	K-2 1000 m
Silver medal – second place	1999 Zagreb	K-2 200 m
Bronze medal – third place	2002 Szeged	K-2 1000 m

Men's canoe marathon

World Championships
Gold medal – first place	2001 Stockton-on-Tees	K-2
Gold medal – first place	2002 Zamora	K-2

Nils Olav Fjeldheim (born 18 April 1977, Tysvær Municipality) is a Norwegian sprint canoer and marathon canoeist who competed from 1998 to 2004. Competing in two Summer Olympics, he won a bronze in the K-2 1000 m event at Athens in 2004.

== Career ==
He won a complete set of medals at the ICF Canoe Sprint World Championships with a gold (K-2 1000 m: 2001), a silver (K-2 1000 m: 2002), and a bronze (K-4 200 m: 1998). Fjeldheim retired from international racing in 2005. He lives in Tysvær Municipality, Norway.
