= Jacob Norenberg =

Norwegian sprint canoer

Medal record

Men's canoe sprint

Representing Norway

World Championships
Bronze medal – third place	2005 Zagreb	K-2 1000 m

Jacob Lorentz Norenberg (born 8 June 1979) is a Norwegian sprint canoer who competed in the mid-2000s. He won a bronze in the K-2 1000 m event at the 2005 ICF Canoe Sprint World Championships in Zagreb.

Norenberg also competed at the 2004 Summer Olympics in Athens, finishing fifth in the K-4 1000 m event.
