= List of Olympic medalists in canoeing (women) =

This is the complete list of women's Olympic medalists in kayaking.

== Current program ==
=== Slalom ===
==== C-1 ====
Games	Gold	Silver	Bronze
2020 Tokyo	Jessica Fox; Australia	Mallory Franklin; Great Britain	Andrea Herzog; Germany
2024 Paris	Jessica Fox; Australia	Elena Lilik; Germany	Evy Leibfarth; United States
2028 Los Angeles			

==== K-1 ====
Games	Gold	Silver	Bronze
1972 Munich	Angelika Bahmann; East Germany	Gisela Grothaus; West Germany	Magdalena Wunderlich; West Germany
1976–1988	not included in the Olympic program		
1992 Barcelona	Elisabeth Micheler-Jones; Germany	Danielle Woodward; Australia	Dana Chladek; United States
1996 Atlanta	Štěpánka Hilgertová; Czech Republic	Dana Chladek; United States	Myriam Fox-Jerusalmi; France
2000 Sydney	Štěpánka Hilgertová; Czech Republic	Brigitte Guibal; France	Anne-Lise Bardet; France
2004 Athens	Elena Kaliská; Slovakia	Rebecca Giddens; United States	Helen Reeves; Great Britain
2008 Beijing	Elena Kaliská; Slovakia	Jacqueline Lawrence; Australia	Violetta Oblinger-Peters; Austria
2012 London	Émilie Fer; France	Jessica Fox; Australia	Maialen Chourraut; Spain
2016 Rio de Janeiro	Maialen Chourraut; Spain	Luuka Jones; New Zealand	Jessica Fox; Australia
2020 Tokyo	Ricarda Funk; Germany	Maialen Chourraut; Spain	Jessica Fox; Australia
2024 Paris	Jessica Fox; Australia	Klaudia Zwolińska; Poland	Kimberley Woods; Great Britain
2028 Los Angeles			

==== Kayak cross ====
Games	Gold	Silver	Bronze
2024 Paris	Noemie Fox; Australia	Angèle Hug; France	Kimberley Woods; Great Britain
2028 Los Angeles			

=== Sprint ===
==== C-1 200 metres ====
Games	Gold	Silver	Bronze
2020 Tokyo	Nevin Harrison; United States	Laurence Vincent Lapointe; Canada	Liudmyla Luzan; Ukraine
2024 Paris	Katie Vincent; Canada	Nevin Harrison; United States	Yarisleidis Cirilo; Cuba
2028 Los Angeles			

==== C-2 500 metres ====
Games	Gold	Silver	Bronze
2020 Tokyo	Xu Shixiao and Sun Mengya; China	Anastasiia Chetverikova and Liudmyla Luzan; Ukraine	Laurence Vincent Lapointe and Katie Vincent; Canada
2024 Paris	Xu Shixiao and Sun Mengya; China	Anastasiia Rybachok and Liudmyla Luzan; Ukraine	Sloan MacKenzie and Katie Vincent; Canada
2028 Los Angeles			

==== K-1 500 metres ====
Games	Gold	Silver	Bronze
1948 London	Karen Hoff; Denmark	Alida van der Anker-Doedens; Netherlands	Fritzi Schwingl; Austria
1952 Helsinki	Sylvi Saimo; Finland	Gertrude Liebhart; Austria	Nina Savina; Soviet Union
1956 Melbourne	Yelizaveta Dementyeva; Soviet Union	Therese Zenz; United Team of Germany	Tove Søby; Denmark
1960 Rome	Antonina Seredina; Soviet Union	Therese Zenz; United Team of Germany	Daniela Walkowiak; Poland
1964 Tokyo	Lyudmila Khvedosiuk; Soviet Union	Hilde Lauer; Romania	Marcia Jones; United States
1968 Mexico City	Lyudmila Pinayeva; Soviet Union	Renate Breuer; West Germany	Viorica Dumitru; Romania
1972 Munich	Yulia Ryabchinskaya; Soviet Union	Mieke Jaapies; Netherlands	Anna Pfeffer; Hungary
1976 Montreal	Carola Zirzow; East Germany	Tatiana Korshunova; Soviet Union	Klára Rajnai; Hungary
1980 Moscow	Birgit Fischer; East Germany	Vanja Gesheva; Bulgaria	Antonina Melnikova; Soviet Union
1984 Los Angeles	Agneta Andersson; Sweden	Barbara Schüttpelz; West Germany	Annemiek Derckx; Netherlands
1988 Seoul	Vanja Gesheva; Bulgaria	Birgit Schmidt; East Germany	Izabela Dylewska; Poland
1992 Barcelona	Birgit Schmidt; Germany	Rita Kőbán; Hungary	Izabela Dylewska; Poland
1996 Atlanta	Rita Kőbán; Hungary	Caroline Brunet; Canada	Josefa Idem; Italy
2000 Sydney	Josefa Idem Guerrini; Italy	Caroline Brunet; Canada	Katrin Borchert; Australia
2004 Athens	Natasa Janics; Hungary	Josefa Idem Guerrini; Italy	Caroline Brunet; Canada
2008 Beijing	Inna Osypenko; Ukraine	Josefa Idem; Italy	Katrin Wagner-Augustin; Germany
2012 London	Danuta Kozák; Hungary	Inna Osypenko; Ukraine	Bridgitte Hartley; South Africa
2016 Rio de Janeiro	Danuta Kozák; Hungary	Emma Jørgensen; Denmark	Lisa Carrington; New Zealand
2020 Tokyo	Lisa Carrington; New Zealand	Tamara Csipes; Hungary	Emma Jørgensen; Denmark
2024 Paris	Lisa Carrington; New Zealand	Tamara Csipes; Hungary	Emma Jørgensen; Denmark
2028 Los Angeles			

==== K-2 500 metres ====
Games	Gold	Silver	Bronze
1960 Rome	Mariya Shubina and Antonina Seredina; Soviet Union	Therese Zenz and Ingrid Hartmann; United Team of Germany	Klára Fried-Bánfalvi and Vilma Egresi; Hungary
1964 Tokyo	Annemarie Zimmermann and Roswitha Esser; United Team of Germany	Francine Fox and Glorianne Perrier; United States	Hilde Lauer and Cornelia Sideri; Romania
1968 Mexico City	Annemarie Zimmermann and Roswitha Esser; West Germany	Anna Pfeffer and Katalin Rozsnyói; Hungary	Lyudmila Pinayeva and Antonina Seredina; Soviet Union
1972 Munich	Lyudmila Pinayeva and Yekaterina Kuryshko; Soviet Union	Ilse Kaschube and Petra Grabowski; East Germany	Maria Nichiforov and Viorica Dumitru; Romania
1976 Montreal	Nina Gopova and Galina Kreft; Soviet Union	Anna Pfeffer and Klára Rajnai; Hungary	Bärbel Köster and Carola Zirzow; East Germany
1980 Moscow	Carsta Genäuß and Martina Bischof; East Germany	Galina Alexeyeva and Nina Trofimova; Soviet Union	Éva Rakusz and Mária Zakariás; Hungary
1984 Los Angeles	Agneta Andersson and Anna Olsson; Sweden	Alexandra Barre and Susan Holloway; Canada	Josefa Idem and Barbara Schüttpelz; West Germany
1988 Seoul	Birgit Schmidt and Anke Nothnagel; East Germany	Vanja Gesheva and Diana Paliiska; Bulgaria	Annemiek Derckx and Annemarie Cox; Netherlands
1992 Barcelona	Ramona Portwich and Anke von Seck; Germany	Susanne Gunnarsson and Agneta Andersson; Sweden	Rita Kőbán and Éva Dónusz; Hungary
1996 Atlanta	Susanne Gunnarsson and Agneta Andersson; Sweden	Birgit Fischer and Ramona Portwich; Germany	Anna Wood and Katrin Borchert; Australia
2000 Sydney	Birgit Fischer and Katrin Wagner; Germany	Katalin Kovács and Szilvia Szabó; Hungary	Beata Sokołowska and Aneta Pastuszka; Poland
2004 Athens	Katalin Kovács and Natasa Janics; Hungary	Birgit Fischer and Carolin Leonhardt; Germany	Beata Sokołowska-Kulesza and Aneta Pastuszka; Poland
2008 Beijing	Katalin Kovács and Natasa Janics; Hungary	Beata Mikołajczyk and Aneta Konieczna; Poland	Marie Delattre and Anne-Laure Viard; France
2012 London	Franziska Weber and Tina Dietze; Germany	Katalin Kovács and Natasa Dusev-Janics; Hungary	Beata Mikołajczyk and Karolina Naja; Poland
2016 Rio de Janeiro	Gabriella Szabó and Danuta Kozák; Hungary	Franziska Weber and Tina Dietze; Germany	Beata Mikołajczyk and Karolina Naja; Poland
2020 Tokyo	Lisa Carrington and Caitlin Regal; New Zealand	Karolina Naja and Anna Puławska; Poland	Danuta Kozák and Dóra Bodonyi; Hungary
2024 Paris	Lisa Carrington and Alicia Hoskin; New Zealand	Tamara Csipes and Alida Dóra Gazsó; Hungary	Paulina Paszek and Jule Hake; Germany
2024 Paris	Lisa Carrington and Alicia Hoskin; New Zealand	Tamara Csipes and Alida Dóra Gazsó; Hungary	Noémi Pupp and Sára Fojt; Hungary
2028 Los Angeles			

==== K-4 500 metres ====
Games	Gold	Silver	Bronze
1984 Los Angeles	Romania; Agafia Constantin; Nastasia Ionescu; Tecla Marinescu; Maria Ştefan	Sweden; Agneta Andersson; Anna Olsson; Eva Karlsson; Susanne Wiberg	Canada; Alexandra Barre; Lucie Guay; Sue Holloway; Barbara Olmsted
1988 Seoul	East Germany; Birgit Schmidt; Anke Nothnagel; Ramona Portwich; Heike Singer	Hungary; Erika Géczi; Erika Mészáros; Éva Rakusz; Rita Kőbán	Bulgaria; Vanja Gesheva; Diana Paliiska; Ogniana Petkova; Borislava Ivanova
1992 Barcelona	Hungary; Rita Kőbán; Éva Dónusz; Erika Mészáros; Kinga Czigány	Germany; Katrin Borchert; Ramona Portwich; Birgit Schmidt; Anke Von Seck	Sweden; Anna Olsson; Agneta Andersson; Maria Haglund; Susanne Rosenqvist
1996 Atlanta	Germany; Anett Schuck; Birgit Fischer; Manuela Mucke; Ramona Portwich	Switzerland; Gabi Müller; Ingrid Haralamow; Sabine Eichenberger; Daniela Baumer	Sweden; Susanne Rosenqvist; Anna Olsson; Ingela Ericsson; Agneta Andersson
2000 Sydney	Germany; Birgit Fischer; Manuela Mucke; Anett Schuck; Katrin Wagner	Hungary; Rita Kőbán; Katalin Kovács; Szilvia Szabó; Erzsébet Viski	Romania; Raluca Ioniţă; Mariana Limbău; Elena Radu; Sanda Toma
2004 Athens	Germany; Birgit Fischer; Carolin Leonhardt; Maike Nollen; Katrin Wagner	Hungary; Katalin Kovács; Szilvia Szabó; Erzsébet Viski; Kinga Bóta	Ukraine; Inna Osypenko; Tetyana Semykina; Hanna Balabanova; Olena Cherevatova
2008 Beijing	Germany; Fanny Fischer; Nicole Reinhardt; Katrin Wagner-Augustin; Conny Waßmuth	Hungary; Katalin Kovács; Gabriella Szabó; Danuta Kozák; Natasa Janics	Australia; Lisa Oldenhof; Hannah Davis; Chantal Meek; Lyndsie Fogarty
2012 London	Hungary; Gabriella Szabó; Danuta Kozák; Katalin Kovács; Krisztina Fazekas	Germany; Carolin Leonhardt; Franziska Weber; Katrin Wagner-Augustin; Tina Dietze	Belarus; Iryna Pamialova; Nadzeya Papok; Volha Khudzenka; Maryna Pautaran
2016 Rio de Janeiro	Hungary; Gabriella Szabó; Danuta Kozák; Tamara Csipes; Krisztina Fazekas	Germany; Sabrina Hering; Franziska Weber; Steffi Kriegerstein; Tina Dietze	Belarus; Marharyta Makhneva; Nadzeya Liapeshka; Volha Khudzenka; Maryna Litvinchuk
2020 Tokyo	Hungary; Danuta Kozák; Tamara Csipes; Anna Kárász; Dóra Bodonyi	Belarus; Marharyta Makhneva; Nadzeya Papok; Volha Khudzenka; Maryna Litvinchuk	Poland; Karolina Naja; Anna Puławska; Justyna Iskrzycka; Helena Wiśniewska
2024 Paris	New Zealand; Lisa Carrington; Alicia Hoskin; Olivia Brett; Tara Vaughan	Germany; Paulina Paszek; Jule Hake; Pauline Jagsch; Sarah Brüßler	Hungary; Noémi Pupp; Sára Fojt; Tamara Csipes; Alida Dóra Gazsó
2028 Los Angeles			

== Discontinued event ==
=== K-1 200 metres ===
Games	Gold	Silver	Bronze
2012 London	Lisa Carrington; New Zealand	Inna Osypenko; Ukraine	Nataša Dušev-Janić; Hungary
2016 Rio de Janeiro	Lisa Carrington; New Zealand	Marta Walczykiewicz; Poland	Inna Osypenko-Radomska; Azerbaijan
2020 Tokyo	Lisa Carrington; New Zealand	Teresa Portela; Spain	Emma Jørgensen; Denmark
