= Canoeing at the 2000 Summer Olympics – Women's K-2 500 metres =

The Women's K-2 500 metres event was a pairs kayaking event conducted as part of the Canoeing at the 2000 Summer Olympics program.

== Medalists ==
Gold	Silver	Bronze
Birgit Fischer and Katrin Wagner (GER)	Katalin Kovács and Szilvia Szabó (HUN)	Beata Sokołowska and Aneta Pastuszka (POL)

== Results ==
=== Heats ===
13 crews entered in two heats. The top three finishers in each heat advanced to the final while the rest advanced to the semifinal.

Heat 1 of 2 Date: Wednesday 27 September 2000
Place	Overall	Nation	Athletes	Time	Qual.
1	2	Germany	Birgit Fischer and Katrin Wagner	1:42.557	QF
2	3	Poland	Beata Sokołowska and Aneta Pastuszka	1:42.905	QF
3	7	Sweden	Anna Olsson and Ingela Ericsson	1:45.491	QF
4	8	Spain	Maria Garcia and Belén Sánchez	1:45.527	QS
5	11	United States	Tamara Jenkins and Kathryn Colin	1:47.735	QS
6	12	Israel	Lior Carmi and Larisa Pesyakhovich	1:48.647	QS
7	13	Belarus	Yelena Bet and Svetlana Vakula	1:55.757	QS

Heat 2 of 2 Date: Wednesday 27 September 2000
Place	Overall	Nation	Athletes	Time	Qual.
1	1	Hungary	Katalin Kovács and Szilvia Szabó	1:42.298	QF
2	4	Romania	Raluca Ioniță and Mariana Limbău	1:43.204	QF
3	5	Canada	Caroline Brunet and Karen Furneaux	1:44.476	QF
4	6	Australia	Katrin Borchert and Anna Wood	1:45.250	QS
5	9	Ukraine	Hanna Balabanova and Nataliya Feklisova	1:46.942	QS
6	10	Russia	Nataliya Guly and Yelena Tissina	1:47.356	QS

Overall Results Heats

Heats Overall Results
Place	Athlete	Nation	Heat	Place	Time	Qual.
1	Hungary	Katalin Kovács and Szilvia Szabó	2	1	1:42.298	QF
2	Germany	Birgit Fischer and Katrin Wagner	1	1	1:42.557	QF
3	Poland	Beata Sokołowska and Aneta Pastuszka	1	2	1:42.905	QF
4	Romania	Raluca Ioniță and Mariana Limbău	2	2	1:43.204	QF
5	Canada	Caroline Brunet and Karen Furneaux	2	3	1:44.476	QF
6	Australia	Katrin Borchert and Anna Wood	2	4	1:45.250	QS
7	Sweden	Anna Olsson and Ingela Ericsson	1	3	1:45.491	QF
8	Spain	Maria Garcia and Belén Sánchez	1	4	1:45.527	QS
9	Ukraine	Hanna Balabanova and Nataliya Feklisova	2	5	1:46.942	QS
10	Russia	Nataliya Guly and Yelena Tissina	2	6	1:47.356	QS
11	United States	Tamara Jenkins and Kathryn Colin	1	5	1:47.735	QS
12	Israel	Lior Carmi and Larisa Pesyakhovich	1	6	1:48.647	QS
13	Belarus	Yelena Bet and Svetlana Vakula	1	7	1:55.757	QS

=== Semifinal ===
The top three finishers in the semifinal advanced to the final.

Heat 1 of 1 Date: Friday 29 September 2000
Place	Nation	Athletes	Time	Qual.
1	Australia	Katrin Borchert and Anna Wood	1:44.682	QF
2	Spain	Maria Garcia and Belén Sánchez	1:45.144	QF
3	Russia	Nataliya Guly and Yelena Tissina	1:46.554	QF
4	Ukraine	Hanna Balabanova and Nataliya Feklisova	1:47.370	
5	Israel	Lior Carmi and Larisa Pesyakhovich	1:48.120	
6	United States	Tamara Jenkins and Kathryn Colin	1:48.300	
7	Belarus	Yelena Bet and Svetlana Vakula	1:49.758	

=== Final ===
The final was held on 1 October.

Heat 1 of 1 Date: Sunday 1 October 2000
Place	Nation	Athletes	Time
1st place, gold medalist(s)	Germany	Birgit Fischer and Katrin Wagner	1:56.996
2nd place, silver medalist(s)	Hungary	Katalin Kovács and Szilvia Szabó	1:58.580
3rd place, bronze medalist(s)	Poland	Beata Sokołowska and Aneta Pastuszka	1:58.784
4	Romania	Raluca Ioniță and Mariana Limbău	1:59.264
5	Canada	Caroline Brunet and Karen Furneaux	2:01.046
6	Australia	Katrin Borchert and Anna Wood	2:01.472
7	Spain	Maria Garcia and Belén Sánchez	2:04.208
8	Sweden	Anna Olsson and Ingela Ericsson	2:04.574
9	Russia	Nataliya Guly and Yelena Tissina	2:04.994

Fischer made history in this race in three ways. First, she became the first woman to win two or more medals in four Summer Olympics. Second, Fischer became the fourth woman to earn seven gold medals. Third, she joined American swimmer Jenny Thompson as the only non-gymnastics competitors to win ten medals in the Summer Olympics.
