= Canoeing at the 2000 Summer Olympics =

Canoeing at the Games of the XXVII Olympiad
- Venue: Penrith Whitewater Stadium (slalom); Sydney International Regatta Centre (sprint)
- No. of events: 16

Canoeing at the 2000 Summer Olympics was held at the Sydney International Regatta Centre for the sprint events and the Whitewater Stadium in Penrith for the canoe and kayak slalom disciplines. The repechage rounds that ran from the 1960 to the 1996 Games were eliminated in the sprint events while qualifying rounds were added to the slalom events. Additionally, a quota system for each event was enacted, meaning each event had a limited number of competitors that could compete.

A total of 16 events were contested, 12 sprint events (9 for men and 3 for women) and 4 slalom events (3 for men and 1 for women).

== Medal summary ==
=== By event ===
==== Slalom ====
Men

Games	Gold	Silver	Bronze
C-1	Tony Estanguet; France	Michal Martikán; Slovakia	Juraj Minčík; Slovakia
C-2	Pavol Hochschorner and Peter Hochschorner; Slovakia	Krzysztof Kołomański and Michał Staniszewski; Poland	Marek Jiras and Tomáš Máder; Czech Republic
K-1	Thomas Schmidt; Germany	Paul Ratcliffe; Great Britain	Pierpaolo Ferrazzi; Italy

Women

Games	Gold	Silver	Bronze
K-1	Štěpánka Hilgertová; Czech Republic	Brigitte Guibal; France	Anne-Lise Bardet; France

==== Sprint ====
Men

Games	Gold	Silver	Bronze
C-1 500 metres	György Kolonics; Hungary	Maxim Opalev; Russia	Andreas Dittmer; Germany
C-1 1000 metres	Andreas Dittmer; Germany	Ledis Balceiro; Cuba	Stephen Giles; Canada
C-2 500 metres	Ferenc Novák and Imre Pulai; Hungary	Daniel Jędraszko and Paweł Baraszkiewicz; Poland	Mitică Pricop and Florin Popescu; Romania
C-2 1000 metres	Florin Popescu and Mitică Pricop; Romania	Ibrahim Rojas and Leobaldo Pereira; Cuba	Stefan Uteß and Lars Kober; Germany
K-1 500 metres	Knut Holmann; Norway	Petar Merkov; Bulgaria	Michael Kolganov; Israel
K-1 1000 metres	Knut Holmann; Norway	Petar Merkov; Bulgaria	Tim Brabants; Great Britain
K-2 500 metres	Zoltán Kammerer and Botond Storcz; Hungary	Daniel Collins and Andrew Trim; Australia	Ronald Rauhe and Tim Wieskötter; Germany
K-2 1000 metres	Antonio Rossi and Beniamino Bonomi; Italy	Markus Oscarsson and Henrik Nilsson; Sweden	Krisztián Bártfai and Krisztián Veréb; Hungary
K-4 1000 metres	Hungary; Ákos Vereckei; Gábor Horváth; Zoltán Kammerer; Botond Storcz	Germany; Jan Schäfer; Mark Zabel; Björn Bach; Stefan Ulm	Poland; Grzegorz Kotowicz; Adam Seroczyński; Dariusz Białkowski; Marek Witkowski

Women

Games	Gold	Silver	Bronze
K-1 500 metres	Josefa Idem; Italy	Caroline Brunet; Canada	Katrin Borchert; Australia
K-2 500 metres	Birgit Fischer and Katrin Wagner; Germany	Katalin Kovács and Szilvia Szabó; Hungary	Beata Sokołowska and Aneta Pastuszka; Poland
K-4 500 metres	Germany; Birgit Fischer; Manuela Mucke; Anett Schuck; Katrin Wagner	Hungary; Rita Kőbán; Katalin Kovács; Szilvia Szabó; Erzsébet Viski	Romania; Raluca Ioniță; Mariana Limbău; Elena Radu; Sanda Toma

=== By nation ===
Rank	Nation	Gold	Silver	Bronze	Total
1	Hungary	4	2	1	7
2	Germany	4	1	3	8
3	Italy	2	0	1	3
4	Norway	2	0	0	2
5	France	1	1	1	3
5	Slovakia	1	1	1	3
7	Romania	1	0	2	3
8	Czech Republic	1	0	1	2
9	Poland	0	2	2	4
10	Bulgaria	0	2	0	2
10	Cuba	0	2	0	2
12	Australia	0	1	1	2
12	Canada	0	1	1	2
12	Great Britain	0	1	1	2
15	Russia	0	1	0	1
15	Sweden	0	1	0	1
17	Israel	0	0	1	1
Totals (17 entries)		16	16	16	48
