= List of sprint canoeists by country =

This is a list of sprint canoeists by country.

== Australia ==
- Nathan Baggaley

== Belarus ==
- Leonid Geishtor

== Canada ==
- Frank Amyot
- Mylanie Barre
- Caroline Brunet
- Tamas Buday Jr.
- Attila Buday
- Larry Cain
- Jillian D'Alessio
- Richard Dalton
- David Ford
- Karen Furneaux
- Stephen Giles
- Kamini Jain
- Carrie Lightbound
- Angus Mortimer
- Ian Mortimer
- Michael Scarola
- Serge Corbin
- Adam van Koeverden
- Ken Whiting

== Denmark ==
- Henning Lynge Jakobsen

== Hungary ==
- Gábor Árva
- Balázs Babella
- Dalma Benedek
- Zoltán Benkő
- István Beé
- Kinga Bóta
- Ferenc Csipes
- Kinga Czigány
- Éva Dónusz
- László Fábián
- Imre Farkas
- László Fidel
- László Foltán, Sr.
- László Foltán, Jr.
- Klára Fried-Bánfalvi
- Erika Géczi
- Gergely Gyertyános
- Zsolt Gyulay
- Sándor Hódosi
- Csaba Horváth
- Gábor Horváth
- Csaba Hüttner
- Natasa Janics
- Márton Joób
- Viktor Kadler
- Zoltán Kammerer
- Rita Kőbán
- György Kolonics
- Katalin Kovács
- György Kozmann
- Gábor Kucsera
- Roland Kökény
- Erika Mészáros
- Ferenc Novák
- Tímea Paksy
- Anna Pfeffer
- Péter Povázsay
- Imre Pulai
- Éva Rakusz
- Pál Sarudi
- Botond Storcz
- István Szabó
- Szilvia Szabó
- Attila Vajda
- István Vaskúti
- Ákos Vereckei
- Erzsébet Viski
- György Zala
- Attila Ábrahám

== Israel ==
- Lior Karmi
- Michael Kolganov
- Rami Zur

== Moldova ==
- Naum Prokupets

== New Zealand ==
- Ben Fouhy

== Norway ==
- Nils Olav Fjeldheim
- Andreas Gjersøe
- Knut Holmann
- Eirik Verås Larsen
- Mattis Næss
- Jacob Norenberg

== Poland ==
- Marek Twardowski

== Romania ==
- Leon Rotman

== Sweden ==
- Agneta Andersson
- Erik Bladström
- Tage Fahlborg
- Gert Fredriksson
- Susanne Gunnarsson
- John Hron
- Sven Johansson
- Helge Larsson
- Henrik Nilsson
- Markus Oscarsson

== United States ==
- Rami Zur

== See also ==
- ICF Canoe Sprint World Championships
- List of Olympic medalists in canoeing (men)
- List of Olympic medalists in canoeing (women)
