= Romania at the 2000 Summer Olympics =

- IOC code: ROU (ROM used at these Games)
- NOC: Romanian Olympic Committee
- Website: www.cosr.ro (in Romanian, English, and French)

in Sydney
- Competitors: 145 (71 men and 74 women) in 16 sports
- Flag bearer: Elisabeta Oleniuc-Lipă
- Medals Ranked 11th: Gold 11 Silver 6 Bronze 9 Total 26

Summer Olympics appearances (overview)
- 1900; 1904–1920; 1924; 1928; 1932; 1936; 1948; 1952; 1956; 1960; 1964; 1968; 1972; 1976; 1980; 1984; 1988; 1992; 1996; 2000; 2004; 2008; 2012; 2016; 2020; 2024; 2028

Romania competed at the 2000 Summer Olympics in Sydney, Australia. 145 competitors, 71 men and 74 women, took part in 116 events in 16 sports. At the Games, there was some controversy when gymnast Andreea Răducan was stripped of her individual all-around gold medal after testing positive for a stimulant. Răducan had taken cold medicine containing pseudoephedrine given to her by a team doctor.

== Medalists ==
These games were Romania's best showing, both in number of gold medals and total medals won at a non-boycotted games.

Medal	Name	Sport	Event	Date
Gold	Gabriela Szabo	Athletics	Women's 5000 m	September 25
Gold	Florin Popescu, Mitică Pricop	Canoeing	Men's C-2 1000 m	September 30
Gold	Mihai Covaliu	Fencing	Men's sabre	September 21
Gold	Marius Urzică	Gymnastics	Men's pommel horse	September 24
Gold	Simona Amânar (Note: Medals were awarded on 25 September 2000 after Andreea Răducan disqualified due to medical substance.)	Gymnastics	Women's artistic individual all-around	September 21
Gold	Simona Amânar, Loredana Boboc, Andreea Isărescu, Maria Olaru, Claudia Presăcan, Andreea Răducan	Gymnastics	Women's artistic team all-around	September 19
Gold	Angela Alupei, Constanța Burcică	Rowing	Women's lightweight double sculls	September 24
Gold	Georgeta Damian, Doina Ignat	Rowing	Women's coxless pair	September 23
Gold	Veronica Cochela, Georgeta Damian, Maria Magdalena Dumitrache, Liliana Gafencu, Elena Georgescu, Doina Ignat, Elisabeta Lipă, Ioana Olteanu, Viorica Susanu	Rowing	Women's eight	September 24
Gold	Diana Mocanu	Swimming	Women's 100 metre backstroke	September 18
Gold	Diana Mocanu	Swimming	Women's 200 metre backstroke	September 22
Silver	Violeta Beclea	Athletics	Women's 1500 m	September 28
Silver	Lidia Șimon	Athletics	Women's marathon	September 24
Silver	Marian Simion	Boxing	Light Middleweight	October 1
Silver	Maria Olaru	Gymnastics	Women's artistic individual all-around	September 21
Silver	Andreea Răducan	Gymnastics	Women's vault	September 24
Silver	Beatrice Căslaru	Swimming	Women's 200 m individual medley	September 19
Bronze	Gabriela Szabo	Athletics	Women's 1500 m	September 28
Bronze	Oana Pantelimon	Athletics	Women's high jump	September 30
Bronze	Dorel Simion	Boxing	Welterweight	September 30
Bronze	Florin Popescu, Mitică Pricop	Canoeing	Men's C-2 500 m	October 1
Bronze	Raluca Ioniță, Mariana Limbău, Elena Radu, Sanda Toma	Canoeing	Women's K-4 500 m	September 30
Bronze	Simona Amânar	Gymnastics	Women's floor	September 25
Bronze	Simona Richter	Judo	Women's 78 kg	September 21
Bronze	Iulian Raicea	Shooting	Men's 25 m rapid fire pistol	September 21
Bronze	Beatrice Căslaru	Swimming	Women's 400 m individual medley	September 16

Medals by sport
Sport	1st place, gold medalist(s)	2nd place, silver medalist(s)	3rd place, bronze medalist(s)	Total
Athletics	1	2	2	5
Boxing	0	1	1	2
Canoeing	1	0	2	3
Fencing	1	0	0	1
Gymnastics	3	2	1	6
Judo	0	0	1	1
Rowing	3	0	0	3
Shooting	0	0	1	1
Swimming	2	1	1	4
Total	11	6	9	26

Medals by gender
Gender	1st place, gold medalist(s)	2nd place, silver medalist(s)	3rd place, bronze medalist(s)	Total
Male	3	1	3	7
Female	8	5	6	19
Total	11	6	9	26

== Athletics ==
Men
Track & road events

Athlete	Event	Heat		Quarterfinal		Semifinal		Final	
Athlete	Event	Result	Rank	Result	Rank	Result	Rank	Result	Rank
Florin Ionescu	3000 m steeplechase	8:37.44	27	did not advance					
Costică Bălan	20 km walk	—N/a						1:23:42	18

Field events

Athlete	Event	Qualification		Final	
Athlete	Event	Distance	Position	Distance	Position
Bogdan Țăruș	Long jump	8.00	12 q	8.00	9
Ionuț Pungă	Triple jump	16.72	14	did not advance	
Gheorghe Gușet	Shot put	18.56	30	did not advance	
Costel Grasu	Discus throw	NM	—	did not advance	

Women
Track & road events

Athlete	Event	Heat		Quarterfinal		Semifinal		Final	
Athlete	Event	Result	Rank	Result	Rank	Result	Rank	Result	Rank
Otilia Silvia Ruicu	400 m	52.65	27 Q	52.28	22	did not advance			
Elena Iagăr	800 m	2:07.56	30	did not advance					
Elena Iagăr	1500 m	4:11.35	21	—N/a		4:14.75	23	did not advance	
Gabriela Szabo	1500 m	4:08.33	3 Q	—N/a		4:07.38	11	4:05.27	3rd place, bronze medalist(s)
Violeta Szekely	1500 m	4:10.18	11	—N/a		4:06.60	7 Q	4:05.15	2nd place, silver medalist(s)
Gabriela Szabo	5000 m	15:08.36	2 Q	—N/a				14:40.79 OR	1st place, gold medalist(s)
Ionela Târlea	400 metres hurdles	56.40	16 q	—N/a		54.70	5 q	54.35	6
Anuța Cătună	Marathon	—N/a						DNF	
Alina Gherasim	Marathon	—N/a						2:36:16	29
Lidia Șimon	Marathon	—N/a						2:23:22	2nd place, silver medalist(s)
Norica Câmpean	20 km walk	—N/a						1:31:50	6
Ana Maria Groza	20 km walk	—N/a						1:33:38	13

Field events

Athlete	Event	Qualification		Final	
Athlete	Event	Distance	Position	Distance	Position
Oana Pantelimon	High jump	1.94	12 Q	1.99	3rd place, bronze medalist(s)
Monica Iagăr	High jump	1.94	10 Q	1.93	9
Cristina Elena Nicolau	Triple jump	14.14	10 q	14.17	6
Nicoleta Grasu	Discus throw	58.57	19	did not advance	
Ana Mirela Țermure	Javelin throw	56.31	22	did not advance	
Felicia Țilea-Moldovan	Javelin throw	58.75	15	did not advance	

Combined events – Heptathlon

Athlete	Event	100H	HJ	SP	200 m	LJ	JT	800 m	Final	Rank
Viorica Țigău	Result	13.39	1.72	11.53	24.80	6.01	43.48	2:19.65	5893	18
Viorica Țigău	Points	1066	879	630	905	853	732	828	5893	18

== Boxing ==
Men

Athlete	Event	Round of 32	Round of 16	Quarterfinals	Semifinals	Final	
Athlete	Event	Opposition Result	Opposition Result	Opposition Result	Opposition Result	Opposition Result	Rank
Marian Velicu	Light Flyweight	Ballioğlu (TUR); W 20–8	Romero (CUB); L RSC	did not advance			
Bogdan Dobrescu	Flyweight	Yang X (CHN); W 12–3	Mantilla (CUB); L RSC	did not advance			
George Olteanu	Bantamweight	Mikaelyan (GRE); W 7–2	Morales (MEX); W RSC	Vinson (USA); L 19–26	did not advance		
Ovidiu Bobîrnat	Featherweight	Sattarkhanov (KAZ); L 5–14	did not advance				
Gheorghe Lungu	Lightweight	Tebebu (ETH); W 15–3	Bejarano (MEX); L 11–14	did not advance			
Dorel Simion	Welterweight	Tsie (LES); W RSC	Guerra (CUB); W 11–7	Küchler (GER); W 26–14	Saitov (RUS); L 10–19	did not advance	3rd place, bronze medalist(s)
Marian Simion	Light middleweight	Di Corcia (ITA); W 19–8	Zertuche (MEX); W RSC	Esther (FRA); W RSC	Thongburan (THA); W 26–16	Ibraimov (KAZ); L 23–25	2nd place, silver medalist(s)
Adrian Diaconu	Middleweight	Kinzi (ALG); W 19–8	Kumar (IND); W 12–3	Gutiérrez (CUB); L KO	did not advance		
Claudio Rîșco	Light Heavyweight	Mihaylov (UZB); L 6–15	did not advance				
Constantin Onofrei	Super Heavyweight	BYE	Peter (NGR); L 14–17	did not advance			

== Canoeing ==
=== Sprint ===
Men

Athlete	Event	Heats		Semifinals		Final	
Athlete	Event	Time	Rank	Time	Rank	Time	Rank
Florin Huidu	C-1 500 m	1:53.076	4 QS	1:53.277	4	did not advance	
Florin Huidu	C-1 1000m	3:56.770	5 QS	4:03.910	5	did not advance	
Florin Popescu; Mitică Pricop	C-2 500 m	1:41.904	1 QF	BYE		1:54.260	3rd place, bronze medalist(s)
Florin Popescu; Mitică Pricop	C-2 1000 m	3:37.340	1 QF	BYE		3:37.355	1st place, gold medalist(s)
Geza Magyar	K-1 500 m	1:42.733	3 QS	1:41.482	4	did not advance	
Marian Băban	K-1 1000 m	3:45.127	5 QS	3:47.215	7	did not advance	
Vasile Curuzan; Romică Șerban	K-2 500 m	1:33.184	4 QS	1:32.975	6	did not advance	
Vasile Curuzan; Sorin Petcu; Romică Șerban; Marian Sîrbu	K-4 1000 m	3:05.341	5 QS	3:05.101	6	did not advance	

Women

Athlete	Event	Heats		Semifinals		Final	
Athlete	Event	Time	Rank	Time	Rank	Time	Rank
Sanda Toma	K-1 500 m	1:54.738	4 QS	1:56.310	5	did not advance	
Raluca Ioniță; Mariana Limbău	K-2 500 m	1:43.204	4 QS	BYE		1:59.264	4
Raluca Ioniță; Mariana Limbău; Elena Radu; Sanda Toma	K-4 500 m	1:35.935	3 QF	BYE		1:37.010	3rd place, bronze medalist(s)

Qualification Legend: 'R = Qualify to repechage; QS = Qualify to semi-final; QF = Qualify directly to final

== Diving ==
Men

Athlete	Event	Preliminaries		Semifinals		Final	
Athlete	Event	Points	Rank	Points	Rank	Points	Rank
Gabriel Cherecheș	3 m springboard	318.27	35	did not advance			
Gabriel Cherecheș	10 m platform	320.61	30	did not advance			

Women

Athlete	Event	Preliminaries		Semifinals		Final	
Athlete	Event	Points	Rank	Points	Rank	Points	Rank
Clara Elena Ciocan	3 m springboard	265.29	21	did not advance			
Anișoara Oprea	3 m springboard	221.82	36	did not advance			

== Fencing ==
Five fencers, three men and two women, represented Romania in 2000.

Men

Athlete	Event	Round of 64	Round of 32	Round of 16	Quarterfinal	Semifinal	Final / BM	
Athlete	Event	Opposition Score	Opposition Score	Opposition Score	Opposition Score	Opposition Score	Opposition Score	Rank
Mihai Covaliu	Men's sabre	Bye	Jaskot (POL); W 15–12	Lapkes (BLR); W 15–11	Tuoya (FRA); W 15–12	Kothny (GER); W 15–12	Gourdain (FRA); W 15–12	1st place, gold medalist(s)
Victor Găureanu	Men's sabre	Bye	Tarantino (ITA); W 15–10	Pilett (FRA); W 15–10	Gourdain (FRA); L 14–15	did not advance		
Florin Lupeică	Men's sabre	Maya (CUB); W 15–10	Köves (HUN); L 14–15	did not advance				
Mihai Covaliu; Victor Găureanu; Florin Lupeică	Men's team sabre	—N/a			Poland; W 45–20	Russia; L 28–45	Germany; L 27–45	4

Women

Athlete	Event	Round of 64	Round of 32	Round of 16	Quarterfinal	Semifinal	Final / BM	
Athlete	Event	Opposition Score	Opposition Score	Opposition Score	Opposition Score	Opposition Score	Opposition Score	Rank
Laura Cârlescu-Badea	Women's foil	Bye	Dussu (CUB); W 15–6	Jie (CHN); W 15–7	Bianchedi (ITA); W 15–4	Vezzali (ITA); L 8–15	Trillini (ITA); L 9–15	4
Reka Zsofia Lazăr-Szabo	Women's foil	Bye	Mahoney (CAN); W 15–10	Marsh (USA); W 15–7	Vezzali (ITA); L 8–9	did not advance		

== Gymnastics ==
=== Men's artistic ===
Team

Athlete	Event	Qualification								Final							
Athlete	Event	Apparatus						Total	Rank	Apparatus						Total	Rank
Athlete	Event	F	PH	R	V	PB	HB	Total	Rank	F	PH	R	V	PB	HB	Total	Rank
Marian Drăgulescu	Team	9.700 Q	9.500	9.575	9.637	9.625	9.312	57.349	7 Q	9.387	9.387	9.537	9.737	9.587	9.550	57.186	—N/a
Rareș Orzața	Team	9.337	9.500	9.637	9.637	9.162	9.287	56.560	19 Q	9.237	9.425	9.575	9.637	8.962	9.650	56.486	—N/a
Florentin Pescaru	Team	8.850	9.562	9.237	9.587	9.375	9.212	55.823	33	9.550	9.450	9.575	9.600	9.050	8.687	55.786	—N/a
Ioan Suciu	Team	9.437	9.712	9.425	9.350	9.612	9.237	56.773	15 Q	9.212	9.637	9.537	9.737	9.587	9.550	56.836	—N/a
Marius Urzică	Team	—N/a	9.812	—N/a		9.662	9.575	29.049	82	—N/a	9.787	—N/a		9.712	8.787	28.286	—N/a
Total	Team	37.324	38.586	37.874	38.211	38.274	37.411	227.480	6 Q	37.386	38.299	37.836	38.661	37.999	37.362	227.543	6

Individual events

Athlete	Event	Apparatus						Total	Rank
Athlete	Event	F	PH	R	V	PB	HB	Total	Rank
Marian Drăgulescu	All-around	9.637	9.300	9.562	9.562	9.487	9.550	57.098	13
Rareș Orzața	All-around	9.312	9.612	9.637	9.662	9.462	9.700	57.385	11
Ioan Suciu	All-around	8.712	9.725	9.325	9.212	9.400	9.412	55.786	28
Marian Drăgulescu	Floor	9.712	—N/a					9.712	6
Marius Urzică	Pommel horse	—N/a	9.862	—N/a				9.862	1st place, gold medalist(s)
Marius Urzică	Parallel bars	—N/a				8.887	—N/a	8.887	8

=== Women's artistic ===
Team

Athlete	Event	Qualification						Final					
Athlete	Event	Apparatus				Total	Rank	Apparatus				Total	Rank
Athlete	Event	V	UB	BB	F	Total	Rank	V	UB	BB	F	Total	Rank
Simona Amânar	Team	9.743 Q	9.562	9.675	9.737 Q	38.717	2 Q	9.712	9.550	9.837	9.762	38.861	—N/a
Loredana Boboc	Team	9.250	9.550	9.675	9.337	37.812	17	9.400	9.475	9.600	9.700	38.175	—N/a
Andreea Isărescu	Team	9.193	9.625	—N/a		18.818	86	9.575	9.687	—N/a	9.600	28.862	—N/a
Maria Olaru	Team	9.625	9.225	9.787 Q	9.575	38.212	10 Q	9.581	9.525	9.787	9.687	38.580	—N/a
Claudia Presăcan	Team	—N/a		9.775 Q	8.925	18.700	88	—N/a		9.450	—N/a	9.450	—N/a
Andreea Răducan	Team	9.743 Q	9.562	9.675	9.737 Q	38.717	2 Q	9.712	9.550	9.837	9.762	38.861	—N/a
Total	Team	38.343	38.287	38.912	38.449	153.991	2 Q	38.461	38.237	38.986	38.924	154.608	1st place, gold medalist(s)

Individual events

Athlete	Event	Apparatus				Total	Rank
Athlete	Event	V	UB	BB	F	Total	Rank
Simona Amânar	All-around	9.656	9.512	9.662	9.812	38.642	1st place, gold medalist(s)
Maria Olaru	All-around	9.656	9.600	9.700	9.625	38.581	2nd place, silver medalist(s)
Andreea Răducan	All-around	Disqualified					
Simona Amânar	Vault	9.537	—N/a			9.537	6
Simona Amânar	Floor	—N/a			9.712	9.712	3rd place, bronze medalist(s)
Maria Olaru	Balance beam	—N/a		9.700	—N/a	9.700	6
Claudia Presăcan	Balance beam	—N/a		9.750	—N/a	9.750	4
Andreea Răducan	Vault	9.693	—N/a			9.693	2nd place, silver medalist(s)

== Handball ==
- Aurelia Stoica
- Valeria Motogna-Beșe
- Cristina Vărzaru
- Cristina Dogaru-Cucuian
- Elena Napăr
- Gabriela Doina Tănaşe
- Lidia Drăgănescu
- Luminită Huţupan-Dinu
- Mihaela Ignat
- Nicoleta Alina Dobrin
- Ramona Farcău
- Steluța Luca
- Talida Tolnai
- Victorina Bora

=== Group A ===
Team	Pld	W	D	L	GF	GA	GD	Points
South Korea	4	4	0	0	131	100	+31	8
Hungary	4	2	1	1	119	106	+13	5
France	4	2	0	2	90	93	-3	4
Romania	4	1	1	2	99	101	-2	3
Angola	4	0	0	4	98	137	-39	0

19 September 2000
Romania	25 – 34	South Korea
21 September 2000
Angola	25 – 35	Romania
23 September 2000
Romania	21 – 21	Hungary
25 September 2000
France	21 – 18	Romania

=== Quarter-finals ===
28 September 2000
Norway	28 – 16	Romania

=== 5–8th place ===
30 September 2000
Austria	29 – 23	Romania

=== 7th place ===
1 October 2000
Brazil	33 – 38	Romania

== Judo ==
Men

Athlete	Event	Round of 32	Round of 16	Quarterfinals	Semifinals	Repechage 1	Repechage 2	Repechage 3	Final / BM	
Athlete	Event	Opposition Result	Opposition Result	Opposition Result	Opposition Result	Opposition Result	Opposition Result	Opposition Result	Opposition Result	Rank
Claudiu Baștea	Men's 73kg	Nakamura (JPN); L 0010–0110	did not advance							
Adrian Croitoru	Men's 90kg	Geraldino (DOM); W 0010–0001	Morozov (RUS); W 1001–0000	Huizinga (NED); L 0000–0001	—N/a		Olson (USA); L 0001–1000	did not advance		
Radu Ivan	Men's 100kg	Svirin (BLR); W 0100–0000	Jikurauli (GEO); L 0001–1001	did not advance						
Gabriel Munteanu	Men's +100kg	Jakl (CZE); L 0000–1011	did not advance							

Women

Athlete	Event	Round of 32	Round of 16	Quarterfinals	Semifinals	Repechage 1	Repechage 2	Repechage 3	Final / BM	
Athlete	Event	Opposition Result	Opposition Result	Opposition Result	Opposition Result	Opposition Result	Opposition Result	Opposition Result	Opposition Result	Rank
Laura Moise	Women's 48kg	Park S-J (KOR); W	Savon (CUB); L	did not advance						
Ioana Maria Aluaș	Women's 52kg	Diaz (VEN); W	Liu X (CHN); L	—N/a			Devi (IND); W	Souakri (ALG); W	Kye (PRK); L	5
Simona Richter	Women's 78kg	Bye	Cowen (GBR); W	Luna (CUB); L	—N/a		Tong (USA); W	Lee S-y (KOR); W	Rakels (BEL); W	3rd place, bronze medalist(s)

== Modern pentathlon ==
Athlete	Event	Shooting (10 m air pistol)			Fencing (épée one touch)			Swimming (200 m freestyle)			Riding (show jumping)			Running (3000 m)			Total points	Final rank
Athlete	Event	Points	Rank	MP Points	Results	Rank	MP points	Time	Rank	MP points	Penalties	Rank	MP points	Time	Rank	MP Points	Total points	Final rank
Nicolae Papuc	Men's	178	2	1156	12	13	800	2:10.86	16	1192	DNF	-	0	9:53.89	18	1026	4174	21

== Rowing ==
Men

Athlete	Event	Heats		Repechage		Semifinals		Final	
Athlete	Event	Time	Rank	Time	Rank	Time	Rank	Time	Rank
Valeriu Andrunache; Adrian Bucenschi; Florin Corbeanu; Valentin Robu	Coxless four	6:14.00	4 R	6:11.24	2 Q	6:15.14	6 FB	6:06.73	10
Dorin Alupei; Andrei Bănică; Vasile Măstăcan; Costel Mutescu; Cornel Nemțoc; Gheorghe Pîrvan; Dumitru Răducanu; Viorel Talapan; Florian Tudor	Eight	5:56.93	4 R	5:43.24	2 FA	—N/a		5:43.89	6

Women

Athlete	Event	Heats		Repechage		Semifinals		Final	
Athlete	Event	Time	Rank	Time	Rank	Time	Rank	Time	Rank
Georgeta Damian; Doina Ignat	Coxless pair	7:16.22	1 Q	—N/a				7:11.00	1st place, gold medalist(s)
Veronica Cogeanu-Cochela; Elisabeta Oleniuc-Lipa	Double sculls	7:08.70	1 Q	—N/a				7:05.05	5
Angela Alupei; Constanța Burcica	Lightweight double sculls	7:16.65	1 Q	—N/a		6:59.85	1 FA	7:02.64	1st place, gold medalist(s)
Aurica Bărăscu; Elena Popa; Crina Violeta Serediuc; Doina Spîrcu	Quadruple sculls	6:52.01	5 R	6:50.34	4 FB	—N/a		6:46.78	9
Veronica Cochela; Georgeta Damian; Maria Dumitrache; Liliana Gafencu; Elena Georgescu; Doina Ignat; Elisabeta Lipă; Ioana Olteanu; Viorica Susanu	Eight	6:06.66	1 Q	—N/a				6:06.44	1st place, gold medalist(s)

== Shooting ==
Men

Athlete	Event	Qualification		Final	
Athlete	Event	Points	Rank	Total	Rank
Sorin Babii	10m air pistol	578	11	did not advance	
Sorin Babii	50m pistol	560	9	did not advance	
Iulică Cazan	25m rapid fire pistol	583	11	did not advance	
Iulian Raicea	25m rapid fire pistol	587	1 Q	684.6	3rd place, bronze medalist(s)
Iulian Raicea	10m air pistol	569	30	did not advance	

== Swimming ==
Men

Athlete	Event	Heat		Semifinal		Final	
Athlete	Event	Time	Rank	Time	Rank	Time	Rank
Dragoș Coman	200m freestyle	1:50.20	17	did not advance			
Dragoș Coman	400m freestyle	3:48.77 NR	7 Q	—N/a		3:47.38 NR	5
Dragoș Coman	1500m freestyle	15:12.64 NR	9	did not advance			
Răzvan Florea	100m backstroke	56.35 NR	=21	did not advance			
Răzvan Florea	200m backstroke	1:59.79	5 Q	1:59.44 NR	5 Q	1:59.05 NR	6
Ioan Gherghel	100m butterfly	54.13	21	did not advance			
Ioan Gherghel	200m butterfly	1:59.48	17	did not advance			
Cezar Bădiță	200m individual medley	2:02.48 NR	9 Q	2:02.02	5	did not advance	
Cezar Bădiță	400m individual medley	4:17.11 NR	4 Q	—N/a		4:20.91	7
Cezar Bădiță; Dragoș Coman; Răzvan Florea; Ioan Gherghel	4 × 200 m freestyle relay	7:24.06	9	did not advance			

Women

Athlete	Event	Heat		Semifinal		Final	
Athlete	Event	Time	Rank	Time	Rank	Time	Rank
Camelia Potec	200m freestyle	2:00.18	5 Q	1:59.54	2 Q	1:59.46	7
Camelia Potec	400m freestyle	4:11.92	11	did not advance			
Simona Păduraru	400m freestyle	4:13.89	16	did not advance			
Diana Mocanu	100m backstroke	1:01.18 NR	2 Q	1:00.70 NR	1 Q	1:00.21 OR	1st place, gold medalist(s)
Diana Mocanu	200m backstroke	2:09.21 NR	1 Q	2:09.64	1 Q	2:08.16	1st place, gold medalist(s)
Diana Mocanu	100m butterfly	59.72 NR	12 Q	59.12 NR	3 Q	59.43	8
Beatrice Câșlaru	200m breaststroke	2:27.59	6 Q	Withdrew			
Beatrice Câșlaru	200m individual medley	2:13.72	2 Q	2:13.31	1 Q	2:12.57	2nd place, silver medalist(s)
Diana Mocanu	200m individual medley	2:29.58	34	did not advance			
Beatrice Câșlaru	400m individual medley	4:41.04	4 Q	—N/a		4:37.18	3rd place, bronze medalist(s)
Ioana Diaconescu; Florina Herea; Diana Mocanu; Camelia Potec	4 × 100 m freestyle relay	3:48.78	12	did not advance			
Lorena Diaconescu; Florina Herea; Simona Păduraru; Camelia Potec	4 × 200 m freestyle relay	8:05.24	3 Q	—N/a		8:01.63	4
Ioana Diaconescu; Florina Herea; Simona Păduraru; Raluca Udroiu	4 × 100 m medley relay	4:23.56	18	did not advance			

== Table tennis ==
Athlete	Event	Group stage			Round of 32	Round of 16	Quarterfinals	Semifinals	Final / BM	
Athlete	Event	Opposition Result	Opposition Result	Rank	Opposition Result	Opposition Result	Opposition Result	Opposition Result	Opposition Result	Rank
Adrian Crișan	Men's singles	Błaszczyk (POL); L 2–3	Gerada (AUS); W 3–0	2	did not advance					
Otilia Bădescu	Women's singles	Fadeyeva (RUS); W 3–1	Silva (BRA); W 3–0	1 Q	Suk (KOR); L 2–3	did not advance				

== Tennis ==
Athlete	Event	Round of 64	Round of 32	Round of 16	Quarterfinals	Semifinals	Final / BM	
Athlete	Event	Opposition Score	Opposition Score	Opposition Score	Opposition Score	Opposition Score	Opposition Score	Rank
Andrei Pavel	Men's singles	Norman (SWE); L 7–6, 3–6, 8–10	did not advance					
Ruxandra Dragomir	Women's singles	Pratt (AUS); L 3–6, 3–6	did not advance					

== Weightlifting ==
Men

Athlete	Event	Snatch			Clean & Jerk			Total	Rank
Athlete	Event	1	2	3	1	2	3	Total	Rank
Adrian Jigău	– 56 kg	122.5	~~127.5~~	~~127.5~~	152.5	~~157.5~~	~~157.5~~	275.0	6
Valeriu Calancea	– 85 kg	155.0	160.0	~~162.5~~	195.0	~~205.0~~	205.0	365.0	10
Florin Vlad	– 105 kg	175.0	180.0	~~185.0~~	215.0	220.0	225.0	405.0	7
Marius Alecu	+ 105 kg	165.0	170.0	175.0	215.0	~~220.0~~	~~220.0~~	390.0	15

== Wrestling ==
Freestyle

Athlete	Event	Elimination Pool				Quarterfinal	Semifinal	Final / BM	
Athlete	Event	Opposition Result	Opposition Result	Opposition Result	Rank	Opposition Result	Opposition Result	Opposition Result	Rank
Nicolae Ghiță	85kg	Khadem (IRI); L 3–5	Kapuvari (HUN); L 1–2	Aka-Akesse (CIV); W 10–0	3	did not advance			

Greco-Roman

Athlete	Event	Elimination Pool				Quarterfinal	Semifinal	Final / BM	
Athlete	Event	Opposition Result	Opposition Result	Opposition Result	Rank	Opposition Result	Opposition Result	Opposition Result	Rank
Marian Sandu	54kg	Kang (PRK); W 8–7	Shevtsov (RUS); L 8–11	—N/a	3	did not advance			
Constantin Borăscu	58kg	Yildiz (GER); L 4–6	Barguaoui (TUN); W 7–0	Nikonorov (RUS); L 3–7	3	did not advance			
Ender Memet	69kg	Azcuy (CUB); L 3–4	Abdo (AUS); W 11–0	—N/a	2	did not advance			
Petru Sudureac	97kg	Ljungberg (SWE); L 2–3	Mollov (BUL); W 6–1	—N/a	2	did not advance			

== See also ==
- Romania at the 2000 Summer Paralympics

== Notes ==
- Wallechinsky, David (2004). The Complete Book of the Summer Olympics (Athens 2004 Edition). Toronto, Canada. ISBN 1-894963-32-6.
- International Olympic Committee (2001). The Results. Retrieved 12 November 2005.
- Sydney Organising Committee for the Olympic Games (2001). Official Report of the XXVII Olympiad Volume 1: Preparing for the Games. Retrieved 20 November 2005.
- Sydney Organising Committee for the Olympic Games (2001). Official Report of the XXVII Olympiad Volume 2: Celebrating the Games. Retrieved 20 November 2005.
- Sydney Organising Committee for the Olympic Games (2001). The Results. Retrieved 20 November 2005.
- International Olympic Committee Web Site
