= Canoeing at the 2000 Summer Olympics – Women's K-4 500 metres =

The women's K-4 500 metres event was a fours kayaking event conducted as part of the Canoeing at the 2000 Summer Olympics program.

== Medalists ==
Gold	Silver	Bronze
Germany; Birgit Fischer; Manuela Mucke; Anett Schuck; Katrin Wagner	Hungary; Rita Kőbán; Katalin Kovács; Szilvia Szabó; Erzsébet Viski	Romania; Raluca Ioniță; Mariana Limbău; Elena Radu; Sanda Toma

== Results ==
=== Heats ===
10 crews entered in two heats. The top three finishers from each of the heats advanced directly to the finals while the remaining teams were relegated to the semifinal.

Heat 1 of 2 Date: Tuesday 26 September 2000
Place	Overall	Nation	Athletes	Time	Qual.
1	1	Hungary	Rita Kőbán, Katalin Kovács, Szilvia Szabó, and Erzsébet Viski	1:33.312	QF
2	3	Belarus	Olesya Bakunova, Yelena Bet, Natalya Bondarenko, and Svetlana Vakula	1:34.734	QF
3	4	Spain	Izaskun Aramburu, Beatriz Manchón, Ana María Penas, and Belén Sánchez	1:35.298	QF
4	5	Ukraine	Hanna Balabanova, Olena Cherevatova, Nataliya Feklisova, and Mariya Ralcheva	1:35.454	QS
5	8	Russia	Nataliya Guly, Yelena Tissina, Olga Tishchenko, and Galina Poryvayeva	1:36.870	QS

Heat 2 of 2 Date: Tuesday 26 September 2000
Place	Overall	Nation	Athletes	Time	Qual.
1	2	Germany	Katrin Wagner, Birgit Fischer, Anett Schuck, and Manuela Mucke	1:33.895	QF
2	6	Poland	Aneta Pastuszka, Joanna Skowroń, Aneta Michalak, and Beata Sokołowska	1:35.887	QF
3	7	Romania	Raluca Ioniță, Mariana Limbău, Elena Radu, and Sanda Toma	1:35.935	QF
4	9	Australia	Natalie Hunter, Amanda Simper, Kerri Randle, and Shelley Oates-Wilding	1:37.081	QS
5	10	Canada	Marie-Josée Gibeau-Ouimet, Carrie Lightbound, Julia Rivard, and Kamini Jain	1:38.580	QS

Overall Results Heats

Heats Overall Results
Place	Athlete	Nation	Heat	Place	Time	Qual.
1	Hungary	Rita Kőbán, Katalin Kovács, Szilvia Szabó, and Erzsébet Viski	1	1	1:33.312	QF
2	Germany	Katrin Wagner, Birgit Fischer, Anett Schuck, and Manuela Mucke	2	1	1:33.895	QF
3	Belarus	Olesya Bakunova, Yelena Bet, Natalya Bondarenko, and Svetlana Vakula	1	2	1:34.734	QF
4	Spain	Izaskun Aramburu, Beatriz Manchón, Ana María Penas, and Belén Sánchez	1	3	1:35.298	QF
5	Ukraine	Hanna Balabanova, Olena Cherevatova, Nataliya Feklisova, and Mariya Ralcheva	1	4	1:35.454	QS
6	Poland	Aneta Pastuszka, Joanna Skowroń, Aneta Michalak, and Beata Sokołowska	2	2	1:35.887	QF
7	Romania	Raluca Ioniță, Mariana Limbău, Elena Radu, and Sanda Toma	2	3	1:35.935	QF
8	Russia	Nataliya Guly, Yelena Tissina, Olga Tishchenko, and Galina Poryvayeva	1	5	1:36.870	QS
9	Australia	Natalie Hunter, Amanda Simper, Kerri Randle, and Shelley Oates-Wilding	2	4	1:37.081	QS
10	Canada	Marie-Josée Gibeau-Ouimet, Carrie Lightbound, Julia Rivard, and Kamini Jain	2	5	1:38.580	QS

=== Semifinal ===
The top three finishers in the semifinal advanced to the final.

Heat 1 of 1 Date: Thursday 28 September 2000
Place	Nation	Athletes	Time	Qual.
1	Ukraine	Hanna Balabanova, Olena Cherevatova, Nataliya Feklisova, and Mariya Ralcheva	1:37.704	QF
2	Russia	Nataliya Guly, Yelena Tissina, Olga Tishchenko, and Galina Poryvayeva	1:38.262	QF
3	Canada	Marie-Josée Gibeau-Ouimet, Carrie Lightbound, Julia Rivard, and Kamini Jain	1:38.340	QF
4	Australia	Natalie Hunter, Amanda Simper, Kerri Randle, and Shelley Oates-Wilding	1:38.580	

=== Final ===
Heat 1 of 1 Date: Saturday 30 September 2000
Place	Athlete	Nation	Time
1st place, gold medalist(s)	Germany	Katrin Wagner, Birgit Fischer, Anett Schuck, and Manuela Mucke	1:34.532
2nd place, silver medalist(s)	Hungary	Rita Kőbán, Katalin Kovács, Szilvia Szabó, and Erzsébet Viski	1:34.946
3rd place, bronze medalist(s)	Romania	Raluca Ioniță, Mariana Limbău, Elena Radu, and Sanda Toma	1:37.010
4	Poland	Aneta Pastuszka, Joanna Skowroń, Aneta Michalak, and Beata Sokołowska	1:37.076
5	Ukraine	Hanna Balabanova, Olena Cherevatova, Nataliya Feklisova, and Mariya Ralcheva	1:37.544
6	Belarus	Olesya Bakunova, Yelena Bet, Natalya Bondarenko, and Svetlana Vakula	1:37.748
7	Russia	Nataliya Guly, Yelena Tissina, Olga Tishchenko, and Galina Poryvayeva	1:38.624
8	Spain	Izaskun Aramburu, Beatriz Manchón, Ana María Penas, and Belén Sánchez	1:38.654
9	Canada	Marie-Josée Gibeau-Ouimet, Carrie Lightbound, Julia Rivard, and Kamini Jain	1:39.566

Fischer became the first woman in any sport to win Olympic gold medals 20 years apart with this event and the first woman to win gold medals in five different Olympics in any sport. Kőbán's silver medal brought her career total to six: 2 gold, 3 silver, and 1 bronze.
