= All Things Are Possible =

All Things Are Possible may refer to:

== Literature ==
- "All things are possible", a phrase from the New Testament of the Christian Bible, as told in the story of Jesus and the rich young man
- All Things Are Possible, a 1905 book by Russian existentialist philosopher Lev Shestov
- All Things Are Possible, a 1988 book by American author Sue Monk Kidd
- All Things Are Possible: My Story of Faith, Football, and the First Miracle Season, a 2000 book by Kurt Warner and Michael Silver
- All Things Are Possible: The Verlen Kruger Story: 100,000 Miles by Paddle, a 2006 book by Phil Peterson; see Verlen Kruger

== Music ==
=== Albums ===
- All Things Are Possible (album), a 1979 album (including a title song) by Dan Peek
- All Things Are Possible, a 1995 album by Edwin Hawkins
- All Things Are Possible, a 1996 album by The Blind Boys of Alabama
- All Things Are Possible, a 1997 album by Hillsong Worship

=== Songs ===
- "All Things Are Possible", a 1957 song by Harmonizing Four
- "All Things Are Possible", a 1968 song by Johnny Greenwood
- "All Things Are Possible" (song), a 1979 song by Dan Peek
- "All Things Are Possible", a 1986 song by Mr. Lee "Scratch" Perry and the Upsetters on the album Battle of Armagideon (Millionaire Liquidator)
- "All Things Are Possible", a 2012 song by Blues Traveler on the album Suzie Cracks the Whip

== Other ==
- All Things Are Possible (political party), a minor political party in South Africa

== See also ==
- With God, all things are possible, the motto of the U.S. State of Ohio
- All Things Possible, a 2012 album by Contemporary Christian musician Mark Schultz
- All Things Possible: Setbacks and Success in Politics and Life, a 2014 book by Andrew M. Cuomo
