= Canoeing at the 2004 Summer Olympics =

Canoeing at the Games of the XXVIII Olympiad
- Pictograms for slalom (left) and sprint canoeing (right)
- Venue: Hellinikon Canoe/Kayak Slalom Centre (slalom); Schinias Rowing and Canoeing Centre (sprint)
- Dates: 17–28 August 2004

Canoeing at the 2004 Summer Olympics was held at the Schinias Olympic Rowing and Canoeing Centre for the sprint events and the Olympic Canoe/Kayak Slalom Centre at the Helliniko Olympic Complex for the canoe and kayak slalom disciplines. A total of 16 events were contested, 12 sprint events (9 for men and 3 for women) and 4 slalom events (3 for men and 1 for women).

== Medal summary ==
=== By nation ===
* Host nation (Greece)

Rank	Nation	Gold	Silver	Bronze	Total
1	Germany	4	4	1	9
2	Hungary	3	1	2	6
3	Slovakia	2	1	1	4
4	France	2	0	1	3
5	Spain	1	1	0	2
6	Canada	1	0	2	3
7	Norway	1	0	1	2
8	China	1	0	0	1
8	Sweden	1	0	0	1
10	Australia	0	2	0	2
10	Italy	0	2	0	2
12	Great Britain	0	1	2	3
12	Russia	0	1	2	3
14	Cuba	0	1	0	1
14	New Zealand	0	1	0	1
14	United States	0	1	0	1
17	Belarus	0	0	1	1
17	Czech Republic	0	0	1	1
17	Poland	0	0	1	1
17	Ukraine	0	0	1	1
Totals (20 entries)		16	16	16	48

=== By event ===
==== Slalom ====
Games	Gold	Silver	Bronze
Men's C-1	Tony Estanguet; France	Michal Martikán; Slovakia	Stefan Pfannmöller; Germany
Men's C-2	Pavol Hochschorner and Peter Hochschorner; Slovakia	Marcus Becker and Stefan Henze; Germany	Jaroslav Volf and Ondřej Štěpánek; Czech Republic
Men's K-1	Benoît Peschier; France	Campbell Walsh; Great Britain	Fabien Lefèvre; France
Women's K-1	Elena Kaliská; Slovakia	Rebecca Giddens; United States	Helen Reeves; Great Britain

==== Sprint ====
Men

Games	Gold	Silver	Bronze
C-1 500 metres	Andreas Dittmer; Germany	David Cal; Spain	Maxim Opalev; Russia
C-1 1000 metres	David Cal; Spain	Andreas Dittmer; Germany	Attila Vajda; Hungary
C-2 500 metres	Meng Guanliang and Yang Wenjun; China	Ibrahim Rojas and Ledis Balceiro; Cuba	Alexander Kostoglod and Aleksandr Kovalyov; Russia
C-2 1000 metres	Christian Gille and Tomasz Wylenzek; Germany	Aleksandr Kostoglod and Aleksandr Kovalyov; Russia	György Kozmann and György Kolonics; Hungary
K-1 500 metres	Adam van Koeverden; Canada	Nathan Baggaley; Australia	Ian Wynne; Great Britain
K-1 1000 metres	Eirik Verås Larsen; Norway	Ben Fouhy; New Zealand	Adam van Koeverden; Canada
K-2 500 metres	Ronald Rauhe and Tim Wieskötter; Germany	Clint Robinson and Nathan Baggaley; Australia	Raman Piatrushenka and Vadzim Makhneu; Belarus
K-2 1000 metres	Markus Oscarsson and Henrik Nilsson; Sweden	Antonio Rossi and Beniamino Bonomi; Italy	Eirik Verås Larsen and Nils Olav Fjeldheim; Norway
K-4 1000 metres	Hungary; Zoltán Kammerer; Botond Storcz; Ákos Vereckei; Gábor Horváth	Germany; Andreas Ihle; Mark Zabel; Björn Bach; Stefan Ulm	Slovakia; Richard Riszdorfer; Michal Riszdorfer; Erik Vlček; Juraj Bača

Women

Games	Gold	Silver	Bronze
K-1 500 metres	Natasa Janics; Hungary	Josefa Idem Guerrini; Italy	Caroline Brunet; Canada
K-2 500 metres	Katalin Kovács and Natasa Janics; Hungary	Birgit Fischer and Carolin Leonhardt; Germany	Beata Sokołowska-Kulesza and Aneta Pastuszka; Poland
K-4 500 metres	Germany; Birgit Fischer; Carolin Leonhardt; Maike Nollen; Katrin Wagner	Hungary; Katalin Kovács; Szilvia Szabó; Erzsébet Viski; Kinga Bóta	Ukraine; Inna Osypenko; Tetyana Semykina; Hanna Balabanova; Olena Cherevatova
