= Cherecheș =

Cherecheș and Chiricheș are Romanian surnames, derived from the Hungarian Kerekes. Notable people with the surname include:

- Cătălin Cherecheș, Romanian politician
- Gabriel Cherecheș, Romanian diver
- Vlad Chiricheș, Romanian footballer
