= Canoeing at the 2004 Summer Olympics – Women's K-4 500 metres =

These are the results of the women's K-4 500 metres competition in canoeing at the 2004 Summer Olympics. The K-4 event is raced by four-person canoe sprint kayaks.

== Medalists ==
Gold	Silver	Bronze
Germany; Birgit Fischer; Maike Nollen; Katrin Wagner; Carolin Leonhardt	Hungary; Katalin Kovács; Szilvia Szabó; Erzsébet Viski; Kinga Bóta	Ukraine; Inna Osypenko; Tetyana Semykina; Hanna Balabanova; Olena Cherevatova

== Heats ==
The 10 teams first raced in two heats. The top three finishers in each heat advanced directly to the final, and the remaining four teams advanced to the semifinal. No teams were eliminated in the heats. The heats were raced on August 23.

Heat 1
1.	Germany	Birgit Fischer, Maike Nollen, Katrin Wagner, Carolin Leonhardt	1:31.606	QF
2.	Hungary	Katalin Kovács, Szilvia Szabó, Erzsébet Viski, Kinga Bóta	1:32.298	QF
3.	China	Xu Linbei, Zhong Hongyan, He Jing, Gao Yi	1:34.206	QF
4.	Australia	Chantal Meek, Amanda Rankin, Kate Barclay, Lisa Oldenhof	1:35.078	QS
5.	United States	Carrie Johnson, Kathryn Colin, Lauren Spalding, Marie Mijalis	1:36.994	QS
Heat 2
1.	Poland	Karolina Sadalska, Joanna Skowroń, Małgorzata Czajczyńska, Aneta Białkowska	1:31.949	QF
2.	Ukraine	Inna Osypenko, Tetyana Semykina, Hanna Balabanova, Olena Cherevatova	1:33.057	QF
3.	Spain	Isabel Garcia, Beatriz Manchon, Jana Smidakova, Maria Teresa Portela	1:34.525	QF
4.	Japan	Shinobu Kitamoto, Yumiko Suzuki, Mikiko Takeya, Miho Adachi	1:36.873	QS
5.	Canada	Karen Furneaux, Carrie Lightbound, Kamini Jain, Jillian D'Alessio	1:36.877	QS

== Semifinal ==
The top three finishers in the semifinal race qualified for the final, joining the six teams that had advanced directly from the heats. The last place team was eliminated. The semifinal was raced on August 25.

1.	Australia	1:33.977	QF
2.	Japan	1:35.493	QF
3.	Canada	1:35.645	QF
4.	United States	1:35.869

== Final ==
The final was raced on August 27.

Gold	Germany	1:34.340
Silver	Hungary	1:34.536
Bronze	Ukraine	1:36.192
4.	Poland	1:36.376
5.	Spain	1:37.908
6.	Australia	1:38.116
7.	China	1:38.144
8.	Canada	1:39.952
9.	Japan	1:40.188
