= Simper =

As well as being a noun and a verb in its own right ("simper"), Simper is also a surname.

Notable people with the surname Simper include:

- Amanda Simper (born 1968), Australian canoeist
- Caleb Simper (1856–1942), English composer and organist
- Lewis Simper (born 2001), English footballer
- Lisbeth Simper (born 1978), Danish cyclist
- Nick Simper (born 1945) English bass guitarist, member of Deep Purple

== See also ==
- Johnson Simpers (1793–1887), American politician from Maryland
