= Yelena Tissina =

Russian canoeist

Medal record

Women's canoe sprint

World Championships
Bronze medal – third place	1997 Dartmouth	K-2 200 m
Bronze medal – third place	1998 Szeged	K-4 200 m

Yelena Tissina (Russian: Елена Тиссина, born February 10, 1977) is a Russian sprint canoer who competed in the late 1990s and early 2000s. She won two bronze medals at the ICF Canoe Sprint World Championships with one in 1997 (K-2 200 m) and one in 1998 (K-4 200 m).

Tissina also competed at the 2000 Summer Olympics in Sydney, finishing seventh in the K-4 500 m event and ninth in the K-2 500 m event.
