= Denys Tourtchenkov =

Russian canoeist

Medal record

Men's canoe sprint

World Championships
| Gold medal – first place | 2001 Poznań | K-4 500 m |
| Silver medal – second place | 2001 Poznań | K-4 200 m |
| Bronze medal – third place | 2001 Poznań | K-4 1000 m |

Denys Tourtchenkov (Russian: Дени́с Вале́рьевич Турченко́в; born 7 October 1978 in Volgograd, Soviet Union) is a Russian sprint canoeist who competed in the early 2000s. He won a complete set of medals at the 2001 ICF Canoe Sprint World Championships in Poznań with a gold (K-4 500 m), a silver (K-4 200), and a bronze (K-4 1000 m).
