= Natalya Bondarenko =

Belarusian sprint canoer (born 1978)

Medal record

Women's canoe sprint

World Championships
| Bronze medal – third place | 2006 Szeged | K-2 1000 m |

Natalya Bondarenko (Belarusian: Наталля Бандарэнка; born 16 December 1978) is a Belarusian sprint canoeist who competed in the 2000s. She won a bronze medal in the K-2 1000 m event at the 2006 ICF Canoe Sprint World Championships in Szeged.

Bondarenko also finished sixth in the K-4 500 m event at the 2000 Summer Olympics in Sydney.
