= Verlen Kruger =

American canoeist

Verlen Kruger

Verlen Kruger (June 30, 1922 in Pulaski County, Indiana – August 2, 2004) was an American canoeist who paddled over 100,000 mi (160,000 km) in his lifetime.

== Biography ==
Kruger was born in 1922 in Pulaski County, Indiana. When he was 14 years old, he dropped out of high school to help provide for his family during the Great Depression. During World War II, Kruger got drafted into the Army, where he was enlisted to be a tank driver. He graduated from the Army Air Force Flight Training School, and became a pilot, and eventually a flight instructor. Upon his exit from the Army, he moved to DeWitt, Michigan and started in business as a plumbing contractor.

== Paddling ==
Over the course of his life, Verlen Kruger paddled the most miles (over 100,000 miles (160,000 km)) of any single competitor in the sport. Kruger started his paddling career at age 41. Of particular note are the 29,341 km (18,232 mi) Two Continent Canoe Expedition and the 45,130 km (28,040 mi) Ultimate Canoe Challenge, the longest canoe journey ever.

== Legacy ==
During his lifetime of canoeing, he earned 11 Guinness World Records, and was the first canoeist to paddle up the Grand Canyon. A bronze statue of Kruger was erected on the banks of the Grand River in Portland, Michigan by family and friends in 2010.

== Bibliography ==
=== Books ===
- Frentz, Brand; Kruger, Verlen (2004). The Ultimate Canoe Challenge: 28,000 Miles Through North America. iUniverse, Inc. p. 248. ISBN 978-0-595-66973-8.
- Klein, Clayton; Kruger, Verlen (1988). One Incredible Journey. Wilderness Adventure Books. ISBN 978-0-9611596-5-8.
- Peterson, Phil Sr.; Kruger, Verlen (2006). All Things Are Possible: The Verlen Kruger Story: 100,000 Miles by Paddle (Print). Cambridge, MN: Adventure Publications. Inc. p. 304. ISBN 978-1-59193-138-6.

=== Video ===
Kruger, Verlen and Waddell, Clint. Never Before and Never Again: The Fantastic Story of Two Men Who Paddled and Portaged From Montreal to the Bering Sea (VHS Videotape). ASIN B002N393X2.

== See also ==
- List of sprint canoeists by country
- Outline of canoeing and kayaking
- Kayak
