= Ivan Skovorodkin =

Belarusian canoeist

Medal record

Men's canoe sprint

World Championships
Silver medal – second place	2001 Poznań	C-4 1000 m

Ivor Skovorodkin is a Belarusian sprint canoer who competed in the early 2000s. He won a silver medal at the 2001 ICF Canoe Sprint World Championships in Poznań.
