= Olesya Bakunova =

Belarusian sprint canoer (born 1980)

Oleysa Bakunova (born 14 April 1980 in Rahachow) is a Belarusian sprint canoer who competed in the early 2000s. At the 2000 Summer Olympics in Sydney, she finished sixth in the K-4 500 m event.
