= Olga Tishchenko =

Medal record

Women's canoe sprint

World Championships
Silver medal – second place	1999 Milan	K-4 200 m

Olga Tishchenko (born May 6, 1973) is a Soviet-born, Russian sprint canoer who competed from the early 1990s to the early 2000s (decade). She won a silver medal in the K-4 200 m event at the 1999 ICF Canoe Sprint World Championships in Milan.

Tishchenko also competed in three Summer Olympics. For the Unified Team at the 1992 Summer Olympics in Barcelona, she finished ninth in the K-4 500 m event. Four years later in Atlanta, Tishchenko finished seventh in the K-4 500 m event for Russia. She would finish seventh in the K-4 500 m event for Russia again at the 2000 Summer Olympics in Sydney.
