= Galina Chugunova =

Russian canoeist (born 1980)

Medal record

Women's canoe sprint

Representing Russia

World Championships
Silver medal – second place	1999 Milan	K-4 200 m

Galina Vladimirovna Chugunova (Russian: Гали́на Влади́мировна Чугуно́ва; née Poryvaeva Russian: Порыва́ева; born 22 February 1980 in Kaluga) is a Russian sprint canoer who competed in the late 1990s and early 2000s. She won a silver medal in the K-4 200 m event at the 1999 ICF Canoe Sprint World Championships in Milan.

Poryvayeva also finished seventh in the K-4 500 m event at the 2000 Summer Olympics in Sydney.

She is currently working coaches in Kaluga Sports school Typhoon.
