= Boris Markin =

Ukrainian canoeist

Medal record

Men's canoe sprint

World Championships
Bronze medal – third place	2001 Poznań	K-4 200 m

Boris Markin is a Ukrainian sprint canoer who competed in the early 2000s. He won a bronze medal in the K-4 200 m event at the 2001 ICF Canoe Sprint World Championships in Poznań. Borys was born in 1979 and now he lives in the United States.
