= 2001 ICF Canoe Sprint World Championships =

Canoe racing championships

- Host city: Poznań, Poland at Lake Malta

The 2001 ICF Canoe Sprint World Championships were held in Poznań, Poland at Lake Malta. The Polish city had hosted the event previously in 1990.

The men's competition consisted of nine Canadian (single paddle, open boat) and nine kayak events. Women competed in nine events, all kayak. The women's K-4 1000 m event was added at these championships, the last change to the program until a new program was approved for the 2009 event at the 2008 ICF Congress in Rome.

This was the 31st championships in canoe sprint.

== Medal summary ==
=== Men's ===
Non-Olympic classes

==== Canoe ====
Event	Gold	Silver	Bronze
C-1 200 m	Dmitriy Sabin (UKR)	Maksim Opalev (RUS)	Michał Śliwiński (POL)
C-1 500 m	Maksim Opalev (RUS)	György Kolonics (HUN)	Andreas Dittmer (GER)
C-1 1000 m	Andreas Dittmer (GER)	Martin Doktor (CZE)	György Kolonics (HUN)
C-2 200 m	Poland; Paweł Baraszkiewicz; Daniel Jędraszko	Romania; Ionel Averian; Mikhail Vartolemei	Cuba; Ibrahim Rojas; Leobaldo Pereira
C-2 500 m	Cuba; Ibrahim Rojas; Leobaldo Pereira	Poland; Daniel Jędraszko; Paweł Baraszkiewicz	Romania; Mitică Pricop; Florin Popescu
C-2 1000 m	Poland; Marcin Kobierski; Michał Śliwiński	Spain; José Alfredo Bea; David Mascató	Cuba; Ibrahim Rojas; Leobaldo Pereira
C-4 200 m	Hungary; György Zala; György Kozmann; Béla Belicza; Gábor Ivan	Czech Republic; Petr Netušil; Jan Břečka; Petr Fuksa; Karel Kožíšek	Russia; Aleksandr Kovalyov; Aleksandr Kostoglod; Vladislav Polozounov; Maksim Opalev
C-4 500 m	Romania; Iosif Anisim; Florin Popescu; Mikhail Vartolemei; Ionel Averian	Hungary; György Zala; György Kozmann; Béla Belicza; Gábor Ivan	Russia; Roman Krugylakov; Konstantin Fomichev; Vladimir Ladosha; Aleksey Volkonskiy
C-4 1000 m	Hungary; György Zala; György Kozmann; Béla Belicza; Gábor Ivan	Belarus; Ivan Skovorodkin; Aleksandr Bagdanovich; Aleksandr Kurlandchik; Aleksandr Zhukovskiy	Romania; Iosif Anisim; Chirac Marcov; Ionel Averian; Mikhail Vartolemei

==== Kayak ====
Event	Gold	Silver	Bronze
K-1 200 m	Ronald Rauhe (GER)	Oleksiy Slivinskiy (UKR)	Anton Ryakhov (UZB)
K-1 500 m	Ákos Verecki (HUN)	Anton Ryakhov (UZB)	Javier Correa (ARG)
K-1 1000 m	Babak Amir-Tahmasseb (FRA)	Javier Correa (ARG)	Lutz Liwowski (GER)
K-2 200 m	Lithuania; Alvydas Duonėla; Egidijus Balčiūnas	Germany; Ronald Rauhe; Tim Wieskötter	Ukraine; Mykola Zaichenkov; Mykhaylo Luchnik
K-2 500 m	Germany; Ronald Rauhe; Tim Wieskötter	Lithuania; Alvydas Duonėla; Egidijus Balčiūnas	Sweden; Markus Oscarsson; Henrik Nilsson
K-2 1000 m	Norway; Eirik Verås Larsen; Nils Fjeldheim	Hungary; Krisztián Bártfai; Krisztián Veréb	Germany; Marc Westphalen; Marco Herszel
K-4 200 m	Hungary; Gyula Kajner; Vince Fehérvári; István Beé; Róbert Hegedűs	Russia; Roman Zarubin; Aleksandr Ivanik; Denys Tourtchenkov; Andrey Tissin	Ukraine; Oleksiy Slivinskiy; Mykola Zaichenkov; Mykhaylo Luchnik; Boris Markin
K-4 500 m	Russia; Roman Zarubin; Aleksandr Ivanik; Denys Tourtchenkov; Andrey Tissin	Romania; Vasile Curuzan; Marian Baban; Geza Magyar; Romică Șerban	Slovakia; Richard Riszdorfer; Michal Riszdorfer; Erik Vlček; Juraj Bača
K-4 1000 m	Germany; Andreas Ihle; Mark Zabel; Björn Bach; Stefan Ulm	Hungary; Zoltán Kammerer; Botond Storcz; Roland Kökény; Gábor Horváth	Russia; Roman Zarubin; Aleksandr Ivanik; Denys Tourtchenkov; Oleg Gorobiy

=== Women's ===
Non-Olympic classes

==== Kayak ====
Event	Gold	Silver	Bronze
K-1 200 m	Karen Furneaux (CAN)	Elżbieta Urbańczyk (POL)	Szilvia Szabó (HUN)
K-1 500 m	Josefa Idem (ITA)	Katrin Borchert (AUS)	Katalin Kovács (HUN)
K-1 1000 m	Josefa Idem (ITA)	Katrin Wagner (GER)	Katrin Borchert (AUS)
K-2 200 m	Spain; Beatriz Manchón; Sonia Molanes	Poland; Beata Sokołowska; Aneta Pastuszka	Hungary; Kinga Dékány; Erzsébet Viski
K-2 500 m	Hungary; Szilvia Szabó; Kinga Bóta	Poland; Beata Sokołowska; Aneta Pastuszka	Spain; Sonia Molanes; Beatriz Manchón
K-2 1000 m	Germany; Manuela Mucke; Nadine Opgen-Rhein	Australia; Katrin Borchert; Katrin Kieseler	Spain; Beatriz Manchón; Sonia Molanes
K-4 200 m	Hungary; Kinga Dékány; Krisztina Fazekas; Erzsébet Viski; Katalin Kovács	Spain; Maria Teresa Portela; Maria Garcia; Belen Sánchez; Ana María Penas	Poland; Karolina Sadalska; Aneta Pastuszka; Dorota Kuczkowska; Joanna Skowroń
K-4 500 m	Hungary; Katalin Kovács; Szilvia Szabó; Kinga Bóta; Erzsébet Viski	Germany; Manuela Mucke; Katrin Wagner; Anett Schuck; Nadine Opgen-Rhein	Spain; Maria Garcia; Belen Sánchez; Maria Teresa Portela; Ana María Penas
K-4 1000 m	Hungary; Kinga Dékány; Szilvia Szabó; Erzsébet Viski; Kinga Bóta	Poland; Karolina Sadalska; Aneta Białkowska; Dorota Kuczkowska; Joanna Skowroń	Ukraine; Hanna Balabanova; Nataliya Feklisova; Inna Osypenko; Tetyana Semykina

== Medal table ==
Rank	Nation	Gold	Silver	Bronze	Total
1	Hungary	8	4	4	16
2	Germany	5	3	3	11
3	Poland	2	5	2	9
4	Russia	2	2	3	7
5	Italy	2	0	0	2
6	Spain	1	2	3	6
7	Romania	1	2	2	5
8	Ukraine	1	1	3	5
9	Lithuania	1	1	0	2
10	Cuba	1	0	2	3
11	Canada	1	0	0	1
11	France	1	0	0	1
11	Norway	1	0	0	1
14	Australia	0	2	1	3
15	Czech Republic	0	2	0	2
16	Argentina	0	1	1	2
16	Uzbekistan	0	1	1	2
18	Belarus	0	1	0	1
19	Slovakia	0	0	1	1
19	Sweden	0	0	1	1
Totals (20 entries)		27	27	27	81
