= Kate Barclay =

Australian sprint canoeist (born 1980)

Kate Barclay (born 4 October 1980) is an Australian sprint canoeist who competed in the mid-2000s. At the 2004 Summer Olympics, she finished sixth in the K-4 500 m event.
