= Mariya Ralcheva =

Ukrainian sprint canoer (born 1978)

Medal record

Women's canoe sprint

World Championships
Silver medal – second place	2003 Gainesville	K-4 1000 m

Mariya Ralcheva (born 22 August 1978) is a Ukrainian sprint canoeist who competed in the early to mid-2000s. She won a silver medal in the K-4 1000 m event at the 2003 ICF Canoe Sprint World Championships in Gainesville.

Ralcheva also finished fifth in the K-4 500 m event at the 2000 Summer Olympics in Sydney.
