= Kerri Randle =

Australian sprint canoeist (born 1974)

Kerri Randle (born 26 March 1974) is an Australian sprint canoeist who competed from the early 1990s to the early 2000s. At the 1992 Summer Olympics in Barcelona, she was eliminated in the semifinals of the K-2 500 m event. Eight years later in Sydney, Randle was eliminated in the semifinals of the K-4 500 m event.
