= Julia Rivard =

Canadian sprint canoer (born 1976)

Julia (Rivard) Dexter (born September 17, 1976) is a Canadian sprint canoer who competed in the late 1990s and early 2000s. Rivard and her teammates finished ninth in the K-4 500 m event at the 2000 Summer Olympics in Sydney. She has since become an entrepreneur in Halifax, Nova Scotia, and has held several positions in Canadian Olympic sports, Government Stewardship and the Arts and Culture community.

== Sporting career ==
Born and raised in North Bay, Ontario, Rivard was a successful multisport athlete, especially as an alpine skier and swimmer. At one time she was ranked in the top ten in Canada in the 200m backstroke and 800m freestyle. She started her canoe-kayak career at the relatively late age of 19. She moved to Dartmouth, Nova Scotia shortly afterward to pursue her training. She was a member of the Canadian national kayak team for three years.

Rivard's career highlights include a fourth-place finish in women's K-4 500m at the 1998 World Championships in Szeged, Hungary. At the same World Championships Rivard was a part of the women's team that won top women's team in the world. In the 2000 World Cup events, she and her teammates won a pair of bronze medals, and also had a fourth- and sixth-place finish. Her competitive career concluded with a ninth-place finish in the K-4 500 m event at the 2000 Summer Olympics in Sydney.

Rivard is a member of the North Bay Sports Hall of Fame and the 2000 North Bay Female Athlete of the Year. In 2025, Rivard was recognized among the Top 100 Athletes in the last 100 years as a part of the 100th anniversary of the North Bay Hall of Fame.

== Education ==
While still a national team athlete, Rivard completed a Bachelor of Recreation Administration degree at Dalhousie University in 2000. In 2003, she completed her Bachelor of Graphic Design at the Nova Scotia College of Art and Design (NSCAD University). She continues to pursue education in the field of communication with a specific interest in Semiotics and its application in learning.

In 2023, Rivard completed her ICD.D Designation from the Rotman School of Management, the graduate business school at the University of Toronto. The ICD.D Designation is a Canadian professional certification for experienced board directors, granted by the Institute of Corporate Directors (ICD) to those who complete the Directors Education Program (DEP) and pass an examination. It signifies a lifelong commitment to boardroom excellence, a desire to stay current with best practices, and the ability to be a more effective director.

== Business ==
After graduation, Rivard founded an incubation center for independent creatives called Queen Street Studios in Dartmouth, Nova Scotia. Queen Street Studios was a new business of the year finalist at the Halifax Chamber of Commerce's 2008 Halifax Business Awards, and was named one of the top ten Nova Scotia startups by the Nova Scotia Business Journal. In 2006 Rivard was nominated for the Globe and Mail's Top 40 Under 40.

In 2008, Queen Street Studios merged with a successful web development firm called Norex.ca led by Brandon Kloybaba, taking on the position of Creative Director. Under Julia's leadership, developer Chris Troup led the Norex team in developing a medal counter widget for the 2008 Summer Olympics in Beijing. The widget had over 3 million downloads during the games and was among the most successful Apple / Mac downloads during that period. Later, Norex designed a similar results application for the 2009 ICF Canoe Sprint World Championships held in Dartmouth. The Norex group of companies was named the eighth fastest-growing company in Atlantic Canada by Progress Magazine in 2009, the sixth fastest-growing in 2010, and the second fastest-growing in 2011.

Rivard was also a partner in SheepDogInc.ca, Canada's first and most successful Google partner. In March 2010, SheepDogInc.ca was one of only 40 partner companies to deploy a Google App, application called gTrax, in the launch of the Google Apps Marketplace. Rivard was brought in as Chief Executive Officer at SheepDogInc.ca and remained in that position until she sold her interest in the company in 2013.

In 2016, Rivard Co-Founded Eyeread Inc. and launched Squiggle Park in 2016, an educational technology that supported the development of early reading skills for students in pre-school to 2nd grade. After successfully selling Squiggle Park to the Seattle Based Dreambox Learning, the company launched the Shoelace Learning platform, including the Dreamscape and Dreamseeker Drift games, to support students in 3rd grade and above lean and master reading and comprehension. Shoelace has gone on to support over 13,000,000 students around the world and was awarded Top 20 Global EdTEch Startups in 2023 but the ASU GSV and then Top 30 Startups globally in the inaugural Global EdTech Prize in 2025.

In February 2020, Julia was elected as a member of the Board at Nova Scotia Power. Nova Scotia Power Inc. is a vertically integrated electric utility in Nova Scotia, Canada. It is privately owned by Emera and regulated by the provincial government via the Nova Scotia Utility and Review Board.

== Sport and community leadership ==
Since 2002 Rivard has continued her involvement in sports as a volunteer. She started at CanoeKayak Canada as an athlete's representative on the Sprint High-Performance Committee, and then moved on to the Executive Committee as Vice Chair of Athlete Relations. She was Vice Chair of Marketing and a member of the CanoeKayak Canada Board of Directors for 13 years. She is a past Board member of Sport Nova Scotia and the Canadian Sport Centre Atlantic. She is currently a member-at-large (B Member) of the Canadian Olympic Committee. In an operational role, Rivard has been to both the 2008 Summer Olympics in Beijing, and the 2010 Winter Olympic Games in Vancouver as a Team Services Officer on the Canadian Mission Team. In that role she managed team operations at both Games.

In 2008, Rivard accepted an appointment to the Board of Directors for the 2011 Canada Winter Games which were held in Halifax.

Since 2011 Rivard has served as an alumni representative on the NSCADU Board of Governors. In 2013 Julia was appointed to the position of the Vice-Chair of the NSCAD Board of Governors and throughout her term lead the strategic visioning and planning process.

In 2012, Rivard was selected as a member of the Manitoba study group for the Governor General's Canadian Leadership Conference.

Around the same time, Rivard co-founded Pursu.it, a not-for-profit crowdfunding platform dedicated to supporting athletes who needed to raise funding to support the costs of training, travel, and coaching for their Olympic dreams. Over the course of 2 years, Pursuit helped over 20 athletes raise over 1,000,000 toward their Olympic Pursu.its.

In February 2013, Rivard was one of 41 Canadian Olympic builders honoured with a Queen Elizabeth II Diamond Jubilee Medal. These individuals were selected for their contributions "work[ing] tirelessly behind the scenes to advance sports excellence in Canada."

In 2014, Julia was presented with the BMO Award for Global Growth and Innovation and was selected as a Finalist for Halifax Business Person of the Year.

== Family ==
Rivard has four children. Julia is married to Steven Earle Dexter of Halifax, Nova Scotia.
