= Marc Westphalen =

German sprint canoer (born 1977)

Medal record

Men's canoe sprint

World Championships
Bronze medal – third place	2001 Poznań	K-2 1000 m

Marc Westphalen (born 14 July 1977 in Hamburg) is a German sprint canoer who competed in the early 2000s. He won a bronze medal in the K-2 1000 m event at the 2001 ICF Canoe Sprint World Championships in Poznań.
