= Svetlana Vakula =

Belarusian sprint canoer (born 1977)

Svetlana Vaklua (born 5 September 1977) is a Belarusian sprint canoeist who competed in the early 2000s. At the 2000 Summer Olympics in Sydney, she finished sixth in the K-4 500 m event while being eliminated in the semifinals of the K-2 500 m event.
