= Kerekes =

Kerekes is a Hungarian-language surname (from Hungary): metonymic occupational name for a wheelwright, from kerék 'wheel' a derivative of kerek 'round'. It may be phonetically transcribed into other languages as "Kerekeš", "Kerekesh", "Chiricheș", "Kerkeshi" or "קרקש".

Notable people with the surname include:

- Attila Kerekes (born 1954), Hungarian footballer
- Gréta Kerekes (born 1992), Hungarian hurdles
- Ljubomir Kerekeš (born 1960), Croatian theatre, television and film actor
- Vica Kerekes (born 1981), Slovak actress
- Zsolt Kerekes (born c. 1972), Hungarian skater
- Zsombor Kerekes (born 1973), Hungarian footballer
- Mat Kerekes (born 1994), American singer and songwriter
- Peter Kerekes (born 1973), Slovak film director and writer
- Katarína Kerekesová (born 1974), Slovak film director, writer and producer
- Éva Kerekes (born 1966), Hungarian actress
- József Kerekes (born 1962), Hungarian actor
- Zsigmond Kerekes (1897-1973), Israeli architect
- Viktória Kerekes (born 1970), Hungarian actress
- János Kerekes (1913-1996), Hungarian composer
