= Amanda Simper =

Australian canoeist

Amanda Simper (born 2 February 1968 in Perth, Western Australia) is an Australian canoe sprinter who competed in the early 2000s. At the 2000 Summer Olympics in Sydney, she was eliminated in the semifinals of the K-4 500 m event.
