= Lior Karmi =

Israeli canoeist

Medal record

Women's canoe sprint

World Championships
Bronze medal – third place	2003 Gainesville	K-1 1000 m

Lior Carmi (sometimes listed as Lior Karmi; Hebrew: ליאור כרמי; born November 1, 1975, in Kibutz Massada) is an Israeli sprint canoer who competed from the mid-1990s to the mid-2000s (decade). She won a bronze medal in the K-1 1000 m event at the 2003 ICF Canoe Sprint World Championships in Gainesville.

Carmi also competed in two Summer Olympics. At the 1996 Summer Olympics in Atlanta, she was eliminated in the semifinals of the K-1 500 m event. Four years later in Sydney, Carmi was eliminated in the semifinals of the K-2 500 m event.

Carmi studied astrophysics and planetary science in Tel-Aviv university, she lives with her family in Ramat Gan and owns a construction company.
