= Florina Herea =

Romanian swimmer

Personal information
- Born: 17 March 1979 (age 47) Ploieşti, Romania

Sport
- Sport: Swimming
Medal record
Representing Romania
European Championships
Gold medal – first place	2000 Helsinki	4x200m freestyle relay

Florina Carmen Herea (born 17 March 1979) is a Romanian freestyle swimmer who represented her native country at two consecutive Summer Olympics, starting in 1996 in Atlanta. Prior to the Sydney Games, she was a member of the women's relay team that won the gold medal in the 4×200 m freestyle at the European LC Championships 2000 in Helsinki, Finland.
