= All Things Are Possible (album) =

Studio album by Dan Peek
- Released: 1979
- Genres: Contemporary Christian music, soft rock
- Label: Lamb & Lion
- Producer: Chris Christian

Dan Peek chronology
All Things Are Possible (1979)	Doer of the Word (1984)

Home Sweet Home Records cover
- Cover for the 1995 release

All Things Are Possible is the solo debut album by Dan Peek after his departure from the popular soft rock band America. The album was released in February 1979 and was a hit on contemporary Christian music radio stations. It was released by Pat Boone's label Lamb & Lion Records and was produced by Chris Christian, who also helped with the songwriting and contributed acoustic guitar and backing vocals on the album.

Peek parted ways with America in 1977 shortly after release of the Harbor album. Years of life on the road had taken a toll on him. He renewed his Christian faith and had begun to seek a different artistic direction than the other band members Gerry Beckley and Dewey Bunnell. With the release of All Things Are Possible, he became a pioneering artist in the emerging Christian pop music genre.

The title track, "All Things Are Possible" was the first single from the album and was a hit on both the CCM and the mainstream charts, reaching No. 6 on the AC Billboard chart and No. 1 in the Christian charts for 13 weeks; making it one of the earliest, if not the first, CCM crossover hits. The second single from the album, "Ready for Love" was a hit in Canada, making the top 10 in the Canadian Adult chart. A third single, "Divine Lady" was released and made the CCM charts. Peek's America bandmates, Beckley and Bunnell, provided backing vocals on another song on the album, "Love Was Just Another Word”. This was the last time the three original members of America recorded together.

The album was nominated for a Grammy Award for Best Gospel Performance, Contemporary at the 22nd Grammy Awards, losing to The Imperials album Heed the Call.

== Track listing ==
1. "All Things Are Possible" (Dan Peek, Chris Christian)
2. "Divine Lady" (Dan Peek, Catherine Peek)
3. "Love Was Just Another World" (Christian, Steve Kipner)
4. "He's All That's Right" (D Peek)
5. "One Way" (Christian)
6. "Ready for Love" (Christian)
7. "Lighthouse" (Tom Peek)
8. "Forgive Me, Forgive You" (D Peek, C Peek)
9. "Home Town" (D Peek, C Peek)
10. "You're My Savior" (D Peek)
11. "Have to Say Goodbye" (D Peek)

== Personnel ==
- Guitar: Larry Byron, Chris Christian, Jay Graydon, Dan Peek.
  Steel guitar: Sonny Garish. Banjo: Chris Christian
- Bass: David Hungate, Steve Schaeffer, Bob Wray
- Keyboards: Bobby Ogden, Michael Omartian, Steve Porcaro,
  Jai Winding
- Drums: Hal Blaine, Mike Botts, Roger Clark
- Percussion: Terry McMillan
- Saxophone: Buddy Skipper
- Harmonica: Terry McMillan
- Violin: Sheldon Kurland
- Backing vocals: Chris Christian
