= Natalya Gouilly =

Russian canoeist

Medal record

Women's canoe sprint

World Championships
| Silver medal – second place | 1999 Milan | K-4 200 m |
| Bronze medal – third place | 1997 Dartmouth | K-2 200 m |
| Bronze medal – third place | 1998 Szeged | K-4 200 m |

Natalya Gouilly (sometimes listed as Nataliya Guly, born August 19, 1974) is a Russian sprint canoer who competed in the late 1990s and early 2000s (decade). She won three medals at the ICF Canoe Sprint World Championships with a silver (K-4 200 m: 1999) and two bronzes (K-2 200 m: 1997, K-4 200 m: 1998).

Gouilly also competed in two Summer Olympics, earning her best finish of seventh on two occasions (K-4 500 m: 1996, K-4 500 m: 2000).
