= María García (canoeist) =

Spanish canoeist

Medal record

Women's canoe sprint

Representing Spain

World Championships
Silver medal – second place	2001 Poznań	K-4 200 m
Silver medal – second place	2002 Seville	K-4 200 m
Silver medal – second place	2003 Gainesville	K-4 200 m
Bronze medal – third place	2001 Poznań	K-4 500 m
Bronze medal – third place	2002 Seville	K-4 500 m
Bronze medal – third place	2003 Gainesville	K-4 500 m
Bronze medal – third place	2005 Zagreb	K-4 200 m

María Isabel García Suárez (born 26 March 1978) is a Spanish canoe sprinter who competed in the early to mid-2000s. She won seven medals at the ICF Canoe Sprint World Championships with three silvers (K-4 200 m: 2001, 2002, 2003) and four bronzes (K-4 200 m: 2005, K-4 500 m: 2001, 2002, 2003).

García also competed in two Summer Olympics, earning her best finish of fifth in the K-4 500 m event at Athens in 2004.
