= Johnny Greenwood (singer) =

Australian country music singer

Johnny Greenwood (born 29 June 1939) is an Australian country music singer. He recorded pop songs in London in the 1960s before returning to Australia to record for RCA. In 1973, Greenwood released a tribute single on RCA to the champion Australian boxer Tony Mundine. He is best known for his trucking song, "Big Bill", which he released in 1975

== Discography ==
=== Albums ===
- Tibrogargan (1971)
- The Goondiwindi Grey (1973)
- The Singing Transport Man (1975)
- Johnny Greenwood (1977)
- Big Rigs and Truck Stops (1980)

=== EPs ===
- Just Another Mile To Go (1969)
- It's Time To Have Some Good Times (1992)

=== Singles ===
- "Loving Arms" (1963)
- "Star of the D.J. Show" (1964)
- "Detroit City" (with Ellie Lavelle) (1966)
- "The Goondiwindi Grey" (1973) - AUS #67
- "Our Champion - Tony Mundine " (1973)
- "Big Bill" (1975)

== Awards ==
=== Tamworth Songwriters Awards ===
The Tamworth Songwriters Association (TSA) is an annual songwriting contest for original country songs, awarded in January at the Tamworth Country Music Festival. They commenced in 1986.

Year	Nominee / work	Award	Result (wins only)
2003	Johnny Greenwood	Songmaker Award	awarded
2017	Johnny Greenwood	Tex Morton Award	awarded
