= Yelena Bet =

Belarusian sprint canoer (born 1976)

Yelena Bet (sometimes listed as Alana Bets, born 2 May 1976) is a Belarusian sprint canoeist who competed in the early to mid-2000s. Competing in two Summer Olympics, she earned her best finish of sixth in the K-4 500 m event at Sydney in 2000.
