= Mitică Pricop =

Romanian sprint canoer (born 1977)

Medal record

Men's canoe sprint

Representing Romania

Olympic Games
Gold medal – first place	2000 Sydney	C-2 1000 m
Bronze medal – third place	2000 Sydney	C-2 500 m

World Championships
Gold medal – first place	2002 Seville	C-4 500 m
Gold medal – first place	2003 Gainesville	C-4 500 m
Silver medal – second place	1999 Milan	C-4 500 m
Silver medal – second place	1999 Milan	C-4 1000 m
Bronze medal – third place	1999 Milan	C-4 200 m
Bronze medal – third place	2001 Poznań	C-2 500 m
Bronze medal – third place	2002 Seville	C-4 200 m
Bronze medal – third place	2003 Gainesville	C-4 200 m

Mitică Pricop (born 25 October 1977 in Constanţa) is a Romanian sprint canoer who competed from the late 1990s to 2004. Competing in two Summer Olympics, he won two medals at Sydney in 2000 with a gold in the C-2 1000 m and a bronze in the C-2 500 m events with Florin Popescu. The following year, they were double European champions over 500 m and 1000 m.

In 2002, Pricop won the World Championship gold as part of the Romania C-4 500 m team. The following year they crossed the line second at the world championships in Gainesville, Georgia, USA, but were later awarded the gold medal after Russian Sergey Ulegin failed a doping test. Pricop won a total of eight medals at the ICF Canoe Sprint World Championships in his career.

Pricop later competed at the 2004 Summer Olympics in the C-1 1000 m event. He placed fourth in his initial heat with a time of 4:00.559, qualifying for the semifinals. There, he placed fifth, this time at 3:59.640. He did not advance to the final.

Pricop, a member of the Dinamo Bucharest club, retired from international competition after the Athens Olympics.
