= All Things Are Possible (song) =

"All Things are Possible"

Single by Dan Peek

from the album All Things Are Possible
- B-side: "Home Town" 1st release; "He's All That's Right" 2nd release
- Released: 1979
- Genre: Contemporary Christian
- Length: 3:02
- Label: Lamb & Lion
- Songwriter(s): Dan Peek, Chris Christian
- Producer(s): Chris Christian

Dan Peek singles chronology
"All Things are Possible" (1979)	"Ready for Love" (1980)

"All Things Are Possible" is the debut solo single by former America member Dan Peek, from the album of the same name, All Things Are Possible. Released in 1979, it was a No. 1 hit on contemporary Christian music stations (staying at the top of the charts for 13 weeks), as well as reaching the mainstream Pop and Adult Contemporary charts, making it one of the first, if not the first CCM crossover hit. The song was written by Peek and Chris Christian, who also produced the single. Since its release, it has been included on several various artists, CCM compilations.

== Chart performance ==
Chart (1979)	Peak position
CCM Hot Hits	1
CCM Hot AC Hits	1
US Billboard Hot 100	78
US Billboard Easy Listening	6
US Cash Box Singles Chart	95
US Record World Singles Chart	123
