= Katrin Wagner-Augustin =

German sprint canoer (born 1977)

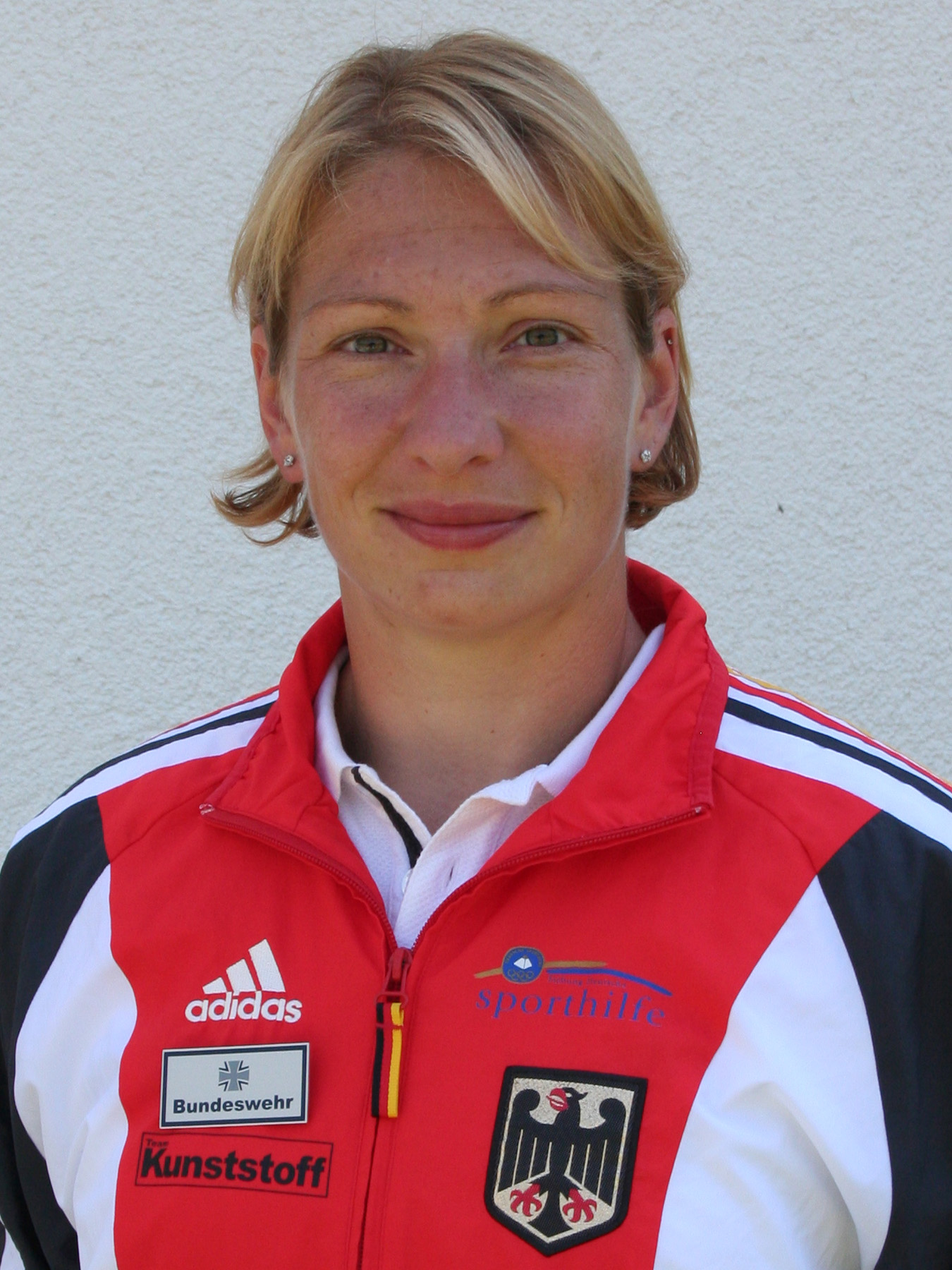

Personal information
- Born: 13 October 1977 (age 48) Brandenburg an der Havel, East Germany
Medal record
Women's canoe sprint
Representing Germany
Olympic Games
Gold medal – first place	2000 Sydney	K-2 500 m
Gold medal – first place	2000 Sydney	K-4 500 m
Gold medal – first place	2004 Athens	K-4 500 m
Gold medal – first place	2008 Beijing	K-4 500 m
Silver medal – second place	2012 London	K-4 500 m
Bronze medal – third place	2008 Beijing	K-1 500 m
World Championships
Gold medal – first place	1997 Dartmouth	K-4 200 m
Gold medal – first place	1997 Dartmouth	K-4 500 m
Gold medal – first place	2005 Zagreb	K-1 1000 m
Gold medal – first place	2005 Zagreb	K-4 200 m
Gold medal – first place	2005 Zagreb	K-4 500 m
Gold medal – first place	2007 Duisburg	K-4 200 m
Gold medal – first place	2007 Duisburg	K-4 500 m
Gold medal – first place	2009 Dartmouth	K-1 4 x 200 m
Gold medal – first place	2009 Dartmouth	K-4 200 m
Gold medal – first place	2010 Poznań	K-1 4 x 200 m
Silver medal – second place	1999 Milan	K-4 500 m
Silver medal – second place	1999 Milan	K-2 1000 m
Silver medal – second place	2001 Poznań	K-1 1000 m
Silver medal – second place	2001 Poznań	K-4 500 m
Silver medal – second place	2002 Seville	K-4 500 m
Silver medal – second place	2002 Seville	K-2 500 m
Silver medal – second place	2002 Seville	K-4 500 m
Silver medal – second place	2003 Gainesville	K-1 1000 m
Silver medal – second place	2006 Szeged	K-1 1000 m
Silver medal – second place	2006 Szeged	K-2 200 m
Silver medal – second place	2006 Szeged	K-4 500 m
Silver medal – second place	2009 Dartmouth	K-1 500 m
Silver medal – second place	2009 Dartmouth	K-4 500 m
Silver medal – second place	2010 Poznań	K-4 500 m
Silver medal – second place	2013 Duisburg	K-1 500 m
Silver medal – second place	2013 Duisburg	K-4 500 m
Bronze medal – third place	2002 Seville	K-4 200 m
Bronze medal – third place	2007 Duisburg	K-1 500 m
European Championships
Gold medal – first place	2012 Zagreb	K-4 500 m
Silver medal – second place	2013 Montemor-o-Velho	K-4 500 m
Bronze medal – third place	2013 Montemor-o-Velho	K-1 500 m

Katrin Wagner-Augustin (born 13 October 1977) is a German canoe sprinter who has competed since the late 1990s. She is 5 feet 11 inches (1.80 m) tall, and weighs 161 pounds (73 kg).

Competing in four Summer Olympics, Wagner has six medals with four golds (K-2 500 m: 2000, K-4 500 m: 2000, 2004, and 2008), one silver (K-4 500 m: 2012) and one bronze (K-1 500 m: 2008).

Wagner-Augustin also won 26 medals at the ICF Canoe Sprint World Championships with ten golds (K-1 1000 m: 2005, K-1 4 × 200 m: 2009, 2010; K-4 200 m: 1997, 2005, 2007, 2009; K-4 500 m: 1997, 2005, 2007), fourteen silvers (K-1 500 m: 2009, K-1 1000 m: 2001, 2002, 2003, 2006; K-2 200 m: 2006, K-2 500 m: 2002, K-2 1000 m: 1999, K-4 500 m: 1999, 2001, 2002, 2006, 2009, 2010), and two bronzes (K-1 500 m: 2007, K-4 200 m: 2002).
