= Nataliya Feklisova =

Ukrainian sprint canoer

Medal record

Women's canoe sprint

World Championships
| Bronze medal – third place | 2001 Poznań | K-4 1000 m |

European Championships
| Gold medal – first place | 2001 Milan | K-4 1000 m |

Nataliya Feklisova (Ukrainian: Наталія Феклісова; born 10 October 1974) is a Ukrainian sprint canoeist who competed from the mid-1990s to the early 2000s (decade). She won a bronze medal in the K-4 1000 m event at the 2001 ICF Canoe Sprint World Championships in Poznań.

Feklisova also competed in two Summer Olympics, earning her best finish of fifth in the K-4 500 m event at Sydney in 2000.
