= Manuela Mucke =

German sprint canoer (born 1975)

Medal record

Women's canoe sprint

Olympic Games
Gold medal – first place	1996 Atlanta	K-4 500 m
Gold medal – first place	2000 Sydney	K-4 500 m

World Championships
Gold medal – first place	1995 Duisburg	K-4 500 m
Gold medal – first place	1997 Dartmouth	K-4 200 m
Gold medal – first place	1998 Szeged	K-4 500 m
Gold medal – first place	2001 Poznań	K-2 1000 m
Silver medal – second place	1995 Duisburg	K-4 200 m
Silver medal – second place	1999 Milan	K-2 1000 m
Silver medal – second place	1999 Milan	K-4 500 m
Silver medal – second place	2001 Poznań	K-4 500 m
Silver medal – second place	2002 Seville	K-2 500 m
Silver medal – second place	2002 Seville	K-2 1000 m
Silver medal – second place	2002 Seville	K-4 500 m
Silver medal – second place	2003 Gainesville	K-2 1000 m
Bronze medal – third place	2002 Seville	K-4 200 m

Manuela Mucke (born 30 January 1975 in Wittenberg, Sachsen-Anhalt) is a German canoe sprinter who competed from the mid-1990s to the mid-2000s (decade). Competing in two Summer Olympics, she won two gold medals in the K-4 500 m event, earning them in 1996 and 2000. For winning a golden medal during the Olympic Games 2000 she was decorated by the President of the Federal Republic of Germany Johannes Rau on Febr. 2. 2001 with the Silver Laurel Leaf.

Mucke also won thirteen medals at the ICF Canoe Sprint World Championships with four golds (K-2 1000 m: 2001, K-4 200 m: 1997; K-4 500 m: 1995, 1998), eight silvers (K-2 500 m: 2002, K-2 1000 m: 1999, 2002, 2003; K-4 200 m: 1995, K-4 500 m: 1999, 2001, 2002), and a bronze (K-4 200 m: 2002).
