= Kamini Jain =

Canadian sprint kayaker

Personal information
- Nationality: Canadian
- Born: November 13, 1969 (age 55); Tripoli, Libya

Sport
- Sport: Canoeing

Kamini Jain (born 13 November 1969) is a Canadian sprint kayaker who competed in the early to mid-2000s. Competing in two Summer Olympics, she earned her best finish of eighth in the K-4 500 m event at Athens in 2004.
