= Tetyana Semykina =

Ukrainian sprint canoer (born 1973)

Medal record

Women's canoe sprint

Olympic Games
Bronze medal – third place	2004 Athens	K-4 500 m

World Championships
Silver medal – second place	2003 Gainesville	K-4 1000 m
Bronze medal – third place	2001 Poznań	K-4 1000 m

European Championships
Gold medal – first place	2001 Milan	K-4 1000 m
Gold medal – first place	2004 Poznań	K-4 500 m

Tetyana Semykina (Ukrainian: Тетяна Семикіна, née Yatsenkyan - Яценкян, later Teklyan - Теклян; born October 19, 1973) is a Ukrainian sprint canoer who competed from the late 1990s to the mid-2000s (decade). Competing in two Summer Olympics, she won a bronze medal in the K-4 500 m event at Athens in 2004.

Semykina also won two medals in the K-4 1000 m event at the ICF Canoe Sprint World Championships with a silver in 2003 and a bronze in 2001.
