= Ingela Ericsson =

Swedish sprint canoer

Medal record

Women's canoe sprint

Olympic Games
Bronze medal – third place	1996 Atlanta	K-4 500 m

World Championships
Silver medal – second place	1998 Szeged	K-4 200 m
Bronze medal – third place	1994 Mexico City	K-4 500 m
Bronze medal – third place	1995 Duisburg	K-4 200 m
Bronze medal – third place	1997 Dartmouth	K-4 200 m

Ingela Ericsson (born September 27, 1968) is a Swedish sprint canoer who competed from the mid-1990s to the early 2000s (decade). Competing in two Summer Olympics, she won a bronze medal in the K-4 500 m event at Atlanta in 1996.

Ericsson also won four medals at the ICF Canoe Sprint World Championships with a silver (K-4 200 m: 1998) and three bronzes (K-4 200 m: 1995, 1997; K-4 500 m: 1994).
