= Carrie Lightbound =

Canadian kayaker (born 1979)

Carrie Buday (née Lightbound) (born August 8, 1979 in Laval, Quebec) is a Canadian sprint kayaker who competed in the early to mid-2000s. Competing in two Summer Olympics, she earned her best finish of eighth in the K-4 500 m event at Athens in 2004.

Carrie currently is a teacher in Mississauga, Ontario.
