= Belén Sánchez =

Spanish sprint canoer (born 1972)

Medal record

Women's canoe sprint

World Championships
Silver medal – second place	2001 Poznań	K-4 200 m
Bronze medal – third place	1997 Dartmouth	K-4 500 m
Bronze medal – third place	1998 Szeged	K-4 500 m
Bronze medal – third place	2001 Poznań	K-4 500 m

Belén Sánchez (born December 24, 1972) is a Spanish sprint canoer who competed from the early 1990s to the early 2000s (decade). She won four medals at the ICF Canoe Sprint World Championships with a silver (K-4 200 m: 2001) and three bronzes (K-4 500 m: 1997, 1998, 2001).

Sánchez also competed in three Summer Olympics, earning her best finish of sixth in the K-4 500 m event at Atlanta in 1996.
