= Anett Schuck =

German sprint canoer

Medal record

Women's canoe sprint

Olympic Games
Gold medal – first place	1996 Atlanta	K-4 500 m
Gold medal – first place	2000 Sydney	K-4 500 m

World Championships
Gold medal – first place	1993 Copenhagen	K-2 5000 m
Gold medal – first place	1993 Copenhagen	K-4 500 m
Gold medal – first place	1994 Mexico City	K-4 500 m
Gold medal – first place	1995 Duisburg	K-2 500 m
Gold medal – first place	1995 Duisburg	K-4 500 m
Gold medal – first place	1997 Dartmouth	K-2 200 m
Gold medal – first place	1997 Dartmouth	K-2 500 m
Gold medal – first place	1997 Dartmouth	K-4 200 m
Gold medal – first place	1997 Dartmouth	K-4 500 m
Gold medal – first place	1998 Szeged	K-4 500 m
Silver medal – second place	1994 Mexico City	K-4 200 m
Silver medal – second place	1995 Duisburg	K-4 200 m
Silver medal – second place	1998 Szeged	K-2 500 m
Silver medal – second place	1999 Milan	K-4 500 m
Silver medal – second place	2001 Poznań	K-4 500 m
Silver medal – second place	2002 Seville	K-4 500 m
Bronze medal – third place	1993 Copenhagen	K-2 500 m
Bronze medal – third place	2002 Seville	K-4 200 m

Anett Schuck (born 11 April 1970 in Leipzig, Sachsen) is a German sprint canoer and marathon canoeist who competed from the early 1990s to the early 2000s (decade). Competing in two Summer Olympics, she won two gold medals in the K-4 500 m event, earning them in 1996 and 2000.

Schuck also won twenty medals at the ICF Canoe Sprint World Championships with ten golds (K-2 200 m: 1997, K-2 500 m: 1995, 1997; K-2 5000 m: 1993; K-4 200 m: 1997, K-4 500 m: 1993, 1994, 1995, 1997, 1998), six silvers (K-2 500 m: 1998, K-4 200 m: 1994, 1995; K-4 500 m: 1999, 2001, 2002), and a bronze (K-2 500 m: 1993, K-4 200 m: 2002).

She studied at Leipzig University and became a sport science teacher after retiring as an athlete.
