= Birgit Fischer =

German kayaker

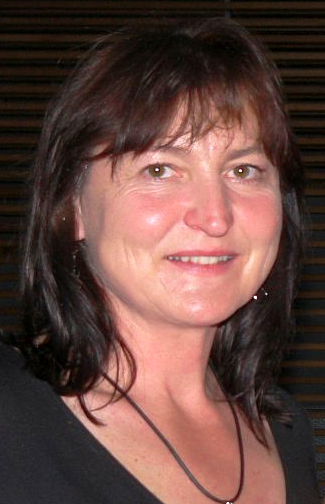
- Fischer in 2010

Personal information
- Nationality: German
- Born: 25 February 1962 (age 64) Brandenburg an der Havel, East Germany
- Height: 172 cm (5 ft 8 in)
- Weight: 69 kg (152 lb)

Sport
- Sport: Canoe sprint
Medal record
Women's canoe sprint
Olympic Games
Representing East Germany
Gold medal – first place	1980 Moscow	K-1 500 m
Gold medal – first place	1988 Seoul	K-2 500 m
Gold medal – first place	1988 Seoul	K-4 500 m
Silver medal – second place	1988 Seoul	K-1 500 m
Representing Germany
Gold medal – first place	1992 Barcelona	K-1 500 m
Gold medal – first place	1996 Atlanta	K-4 500 m
Gold medal – first place	2000 Sydney	K-2 500 m
Gold medal – first place	2000 Sydney	K-4 500 m
Gold medal – first place	2004 Athens	K-4 500 m
Silver medal – second place	1992 Barcelona	K-4 500 m
Silver medal – second place	1996 Atlanta	K-2 500 m
Silver medal – second place	2004 Athens	K-2 500 m
World Championships
Representing East Germany
Gold medal – first place	1978 Belgrade	K-4 500 m
Gold medal – first place	1979 Duisburg	K-4 500 m
Gold medal – first place	1981 Nottingham	K-1 500 m
Gold medal – first place	1981 Nottingham	K-2 500 m
Gold medal – first place	1981 Nottingham	K-4 500 m
Gold medal – first place	1982 Belgrade	K-1 500 m
Gold medal – first place	1982 Belgrade	K-2 500 m
Gold medal – first place	1982 Belgrade	K-4 500 m
Gold medal – first place	1983 Tampere	K-1 500 m
Gold medal – first place	1983 Tampere	K-2 500 m
Gold medal – first place	1983 Tampere	K-4 500 m
Gold medal – first place	1985 Mechelen	K-1 500 m
Gold medal – first place	1985 Mechelen	K-2 500 m
Gold medal – first place	1985 Mechelen	K-4 500 m
Gold medal – first place	1987 Duisburg	K-1 500 m
Gold medal – first place	1987 Duisburg	K-2 500 m
Gold medal – first place	1987 Duisburg	K-4 500 m
Representing Germany
Gold medal – first place	1993 Copenhagen	K-1 500 m
Gold medal – first place	1993 Copenhagen	K-4 500 m
Gold medal – first place	1994 Mexico City	K-1 500 m
Gold medal – first place	1994 Mexico City	K-4 500 m
Gold medal – first place	1995 Duisburg	K-4 500 m
Gold medal – first place	1997 Dartmouth	K-2 200 m
Gold medal – first place	1997 Dartmouth	K-2 500 m
Gold medal – first place	1997 Dartmouth	K-2 1000 m
Gold medal – first place	1997 Dartmouth	K-4 200 m
Gold medal – first place	1997 Dartmouth	K-4 500 m
Gold medal – first place	1998 Szeged	K-4 500 m
Silver medal – second place	1994 Mexico City	K-2 200 m
Silver medal – second place	1994 Mexico City	K-4 200 m
Silver medal – second place	1995 Duisburg	K-4 200 m
Silver medal – second place	1998 Szeged	K-2 500 m
Silver medal – second place	1998 Szeged	K-2 1000 m
Silver medal – second place	1999 Milan	K-4 500 m
Bronze medal – third place	1993 Copenhagen	K-1 5000 m
Bronze medal – third place	1994 Mexico City	K-2 500 m
Bronze medal – third place	2005 Zagreb	K-2 200 m
Bronze medal – third place	2005 Zagreb	K-4 1000 m

Birgit Fischer (German pronunciation: [ˈbɪʁɡɪt ˈfɪʃɐ]; born 25 February 1962) is a German former kayaker, who has won eight gold medals over six different Olympic Games, a record she shares with Aladár Gerevich and Isabell Werth, spanning seven Olympiads: twice representing East Germany (interrupted by the boycott of 1984), then four times representing the reunited nation. After both the 1988 and 2000 games, she announced her retirement, only to return for the subsequent games. She has been both the youngest- and oldest-ever Olympic canoeing champion (ages 18 and 42). In 2004, she was chosen as the German sportswoman of the year.

Fischer was born in Brandenburg an der Havel, then in East Germany. She attended an ASK (army sports club) boarding school in Potsdam, and worked as a sports instructor in the National People's Army, attaining a rank of major by the time of German reunification in 1990. She was married from 1984 to 1993 to canoeist Jörg Schmidt, silver medalist in the C-1 1000 m event at the 1988 Summer Olympics in Seoul. She lives with their two children in Brandenburg. In 1999 she stood unsuccessfully as a candidate for the FDP in the European Parliament election. Fischer's niece, Fanny, competed for Germany at the 2008 Summer Olympics in Beijing, winning a gold in the K-4 500 m event. Fischer's brother Frank won nine world championship medals between 1981 and 1986.

She also won 38 ICF Canoe Sprint World Championships medals between 1978 and 2005, including 28 golds. Fischer's career medal count was surpassed by Hungary's Katalin Kovács at the 2011 championships in Szeged.

Fischer is also a photographer and displays works through the Art of the Olympians.

== See also ==
- List of multiple Olympic gold medalists
- List of multiple Olympic gold medalists in one event
- List of multiple Olympic medalists
- List of multiple Summer Olympic medalists
- List of athletes with the most appearances at Olympic Games

Awards
Preceded by (Germany) Hannah Stockbauer	German Sportswoman of the Year; 2004	Succeeded by (Germany) Uschi Disl
