= Gabriel Cherecheș =

Romanian diver

Personal information
- Nationality: Romanian
- Born: 21 October 1977 (age 47); Bacău, Romania

Sport
- Sport: Diving

Gabriel Cherecheș (born 21 October 1977) is a Romanian diver. He competed at the 1992 Summer Olympics, the 1996 Summer Olympics and the 2000 Summer Olympics.
