= Karen Furneaux =

Canadian sprint kayaker

Personal information
- Born: December 23, 1976 (age 49) Halifax, Nova Scotia, Canada
Medal record
Women's canoe sprint
Representing Canada
World Championships
Gold medal – first place	1998 Szeged	K-2 200 m
Gold medal – first place	2001 Poznań	K-1 200 m
Silver medal – second place	1997 Dartmouth	K-4 200 m
Silver medal – second place	1999 Milan	K-2 500 m
Silver medal – second place	2005 Zagreb	K-1 500 m
Bronze medal – third place	2005 Zagreb	K-1 200 m
Bronze medal – third place	2005 Zagreb	K-1 1000 m
Bronze medal – third place	2006 Szeged	K-1 200 m
Bronze medal – third place	2009 Dartmouth	K-1 4 x 200 m
Pan American Games
Gold medal – first place	1999 Winnipeg	K-1 500 m
Gold medal – first place	1999 Winnipeg	K-4 500m

Karen Furneaux (born December 23, 1976) is a Canadian sprint kayaker who has been competing since 1988. A native of Halifax, Nova Scotia, she won nine medals at the ICF Canoe Sprint World Championships. This includes two golds (K-1 200 m: 2001, K-2 200 m: 1998), three silvers (K-1 500 m: 2005, K-2 500 m: 1999, K-4 200 m: 1997), and four bronzes (K-1 200 m: 2005, 2006; K-1 1000 m: 2005, K-1 4 x 200 m: 2009).

Furneaux also competed in three Summer Olympics, earning her best finish of fifth in the K-2 500 m event at Sydney in 2000.

In 2018, she was named one of the greatest 15 athletes in Nova Scotia's history.
