= Katalin Kovács =

Hungarian sprint canoer (born 1976)

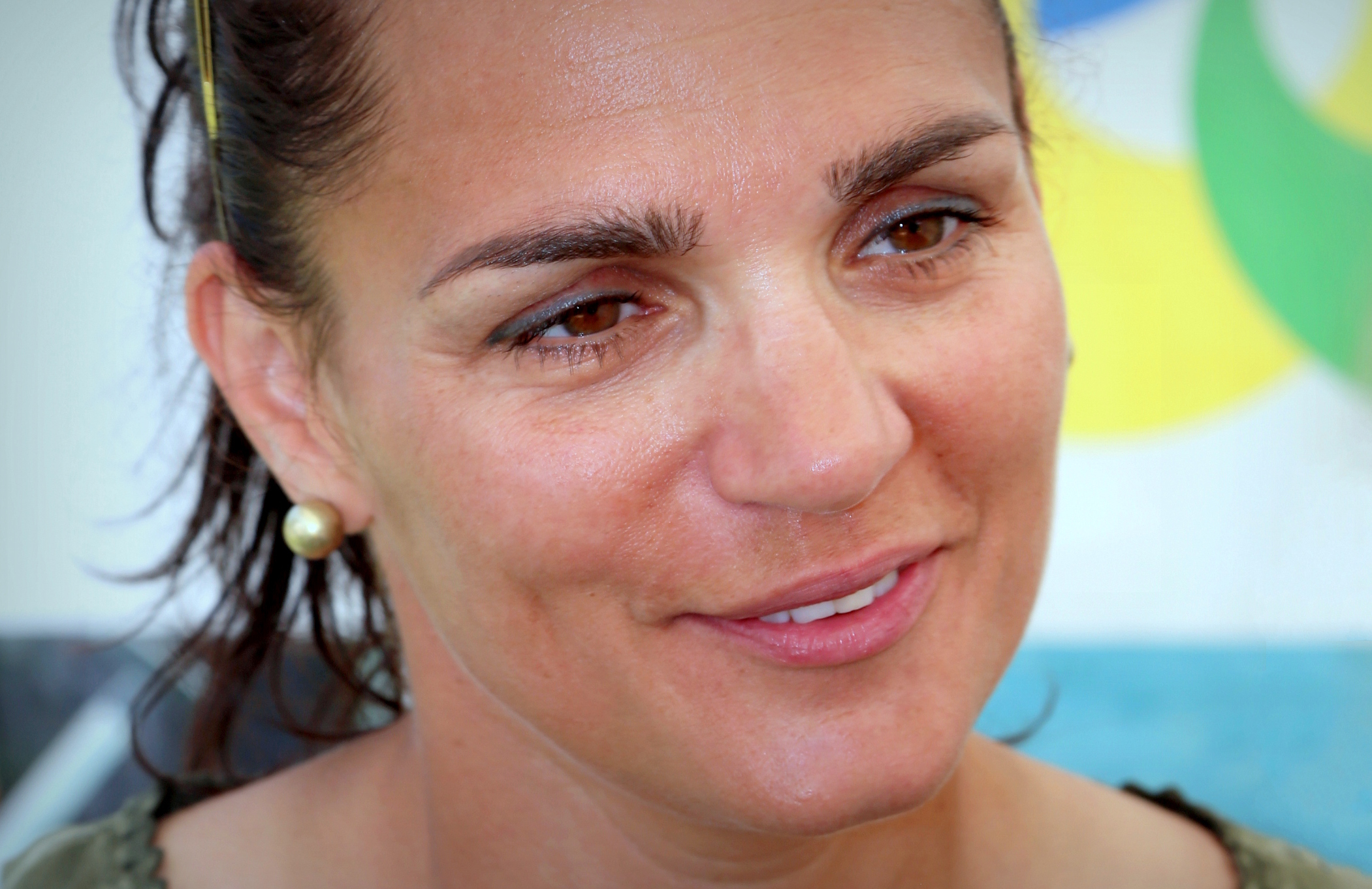
- Kovács in 2016

Personal information
- Nationality: Hungarian
- Born: 29 February 1976 (age 50) Budapest, Hungary
- Height: 1.73 m (5 ft 8 in)
- Weight: 64 kg (141 lb)

Sport
- Sport: Canoe sprint
- Club: Bp. Honvéd (2009–2016); MTK Budapest (2001–2008); Újpesti TE (1997–2001); BKV Előre SC (1995–1996); Budapest SE (–1994); Bp. Spartacus (1987–)
- Coached by: Ferenc Csipes
Medal record
Representing Hungary
Event	1st	2nd	3rd
Olympic Games	3	5	0
World Championships	30	7	3
European Championships	29	1	1
European Games	0	0	0
Total	62	11	4
Olympic Games
Gold medal – first place	2004 Athens	K-2 500 m
Gold medal – first place	2008 Beijing	K-2 500 m
Gold medal – first place	2012 London	K-4 500 m
Silver medal – second place	2000 Sydney	K-2 500 m
Silver medal – second place	2000 Sydney	K-4 500 m
Silver medal – second place	2004 Athens	K-4 500 m
Silver medal – second place	2008 Beijing	K-4 500 m
Silver medal – second place	2012 London	K-2 500 m
World Championships
Gold medal – first place	1998 Szeged	K-4 200 m
Gold medal – first place	1999 Milan	K-4 200 m
Gold medal – first place	1999 Milan	K-4 500 m
Gold medal – first place	2001 Poznań	K-4 200 m
Gold medal – first place	2001 Poznań	K-4 500 m
Gold medal – first place	2002 Seville	K-1 500 m
Gold medal – first place	2002 Seville	K-1 1000 m
Gold medal – first place	2002 Seville	K-4 500 m
Gold medal – first place	2003 Gainesville	K-1 500 m
Gold medal – first place	2003 Gainesville	K-1 1000 m
Gold medal – first place	2003 Gainesville	K-4 500 m
Gold medal – first place	2005 Zagreb	K-2 200 m
Gold medal – first place	2005 Zagreb	K-2 500 m
Gold medal – first place	2005 Zagreb	K-2 1000 m
Gold medal – first place	2006 Szeged	K-2 200 m
Gold medal – first place	2006 Szeged	K-2 500 m
Gold medal – first place	2006 Szeged	K-2 1000 m
Gold medal – first place	2006 Szeged	K-4 200 m
Gold medal – first place	2006 Szeged	K-4 500 m
Gold medal – first place	2006 Szeged	K-4 1000 m
Gold medal – first place	2007 Duisburg	K-1 500 m
Gold medal – first place	2007 Duisburg	K-1 1000 m
Gold medal – first place	2009 Dartmouth	K-1 500 m
Gold medal – first place	2009 Dartmouth	K-1 1000 m
Gold medal – first place	2009 Dartmouth	K-2 500 m
Gold medal – first place	2009 Dartmouth	K-4 500 m
Gold medal – first place	2010 Poznań	K-2 200 m
Gold medal – first place	2010 Poznań	K-4 500 m
Gold medal – first place	2011 Szeged	K-2 200 m
Gold medal – first place	2011 Szeged	K-4 500 m
Silver medal – second place	1997 Dartmouth	K-4 500 m
Silver medal – second place	1998 Szeged	K-4 500 m
Silver medal – second place	2007 Duisburg	K-4 200 m
Silver medal – second place	2007 Duisburg	K-4 500 m
Silver medal – second place	2009 Dartmouth	K-4 200 m
Silver medal – second place	2010 Poznań	K-1 1000 m
Silver medal – second place	2013 Duisburg	K-2 500 m
Bronze medal – third place	1999 Milan	K-1 1000 m
Bronze medal – third place	1999 Milan	K-2 500 m
Bronze medal – third place	2001 Poznań	K-1 500 m
European Championships
Gold medal – first place	1999 Zagreb	K-4 500 m
Gold medal – first place	2000 Poznań	K-4 200 m
Gold medal – first place	2001 Milan	K-1 500 m
Gold medal – first place	2001 Milan	K-4 500 m
Gold medal – first place	2002 Szeged	K-1 500 m
Gold medal – first place	2002 Szeged	K-4 500 m
Gold medal – first place	2002 Szeged	K-1 1000 m
Gold medal – first place	2004 Poznań	K-1 1000 m
Gold medal – first place	2005 Poznań	K-2 200 m
Gold medal – first place	2005 Poznań	K-2 500 m
Gold medal – first place	2005 Poznań	K-2 1000 m
Gold medal – first place	2006 Račice	K-2 200 m
Gold medal – first place	2006 Račice	K-4 200 m
Gold medal – first place	2006 Račice	K-2 500 m
Gold medal – first place	2006 Račice	K-4 500 m
Gold medal – first place	2006 Račice	K-2 1000 m
Gold medal – first place	2006 Račice	K-4 1000 m
Gold medal – first place	2008 Milan	K-1 500 m
Gold medal – first place	2009 Brandenburg	K-4 200 m
Gold medal – first place	2009 Brandenburg	K-1 500 m
Gold medal – first place	2009 Brandenburg	K-1 1000 m
Gold medal – first place	2009 Trasona	K-2 200 m
Gold medal – first place	2009 Trasona	K-2 500 m
Gold medal – first place	2011 Belgrade	K-1 1000 m
Gold medal – first place	2011 Belgrade	K-2 200 m
Gold medal – first place	2011 Belgrade	K-2 500 m
Gold medal – first place	2012 Zagreb	K-2 500 m
Gold medal – first place	2013 Montemor-o-Velho	K-2 200 m
Gold medal – first place	2013 Montemor-o-Velho	K-4 500 m
Silver medal – second place	2012 Zagreb	K-4 500 m
Bronze medal – third place	2013 Montemor-o-Velho	K-2 500 m

Katalin Kovács (born 29 February 1976) is a Hungarian canoe sprinter. She competed in the 2000, 2004, 2008 and 2012 Olympics and won eight medals, with three golds (K-2 500 m: 2004, 2008, K-4 500 m: 2012) and five silvers (K-2 500 m: 2000, 2012, K-4 500 m: 2000, 2004, 2008).

Kovács also won a record 40 medals at the ICF Canoe Sprint World Championships including 30 golds (K-1 500 m: 2002, 2003, 2007, 2009; K-1 1000 m: 2002, 2003, 2007, 2009; K-2 200 m: 2005, 2006, 2009, 2010, 2011; K-2 500 m: 2005, 2006; K-2 1000 m: 2005, 2006; K-4 200 m: 1998, 1999, 2001, 2006; K-4 500 m: 1999, 2001, 2002, 2003, 2006, 2009, 2010, 2011; K-4 1000 m: 2006), seven silvers (K-1 1000 m: 2010, K-2 500 m: 2013, K-4 200 m: 2007, 2009, K-4 500 m: 1997, 1998, 2007), and three bronzes (K-1 500 m: 2001, K-1 1000 m: 1999, K-2 500 m: 1999).

She was elected Hungarian Sportswoman of the Year in 2002 and 2003. Together with Natasa Dusev-Janics, she earned the title Hungarian Sportsteam of the Year in 2005, 2006, and 2010.

== Awards ==
- Hungarian kayaker of the Year (10): 1999, 2000, 2001, 2002, 2003, 2005, 2006, 2007, 2008, 2009
- Hungarian Sportswoman of the Year (2) – votes of sports journalists: 2002, 2003
- Hungarian Athlete of the Year (2) – the National Sports Association (NSSZ) awards: 2003, 2009
- For Budapest award (2004)
- Perpetual champion of Hungarian Kayak-Canoe (2005)
- Member of the Hungarian team of year (with Natasa Janics): 2005, 2006, 2010
- Príma Primissima award (2006)
- Papp László Budapest Sport awards (2012)

Orders and special awards

- Order of Merit of the Republic of Hungary – Knight's Cross (2000)
- Order of Merit of the Republic of Hungary – Officer's Cross (2004)
- Order of Merit of the Republic of Hungary – Commander's Cross (2008)
- Order of Merit of Hungary – Commander's Cross with Star (2012)

== See also ==
- List of multiple Olympic gold medalists
- List of multiple Summer Olympic medalists
- Rita Kőbán
- Canoe
- Kayak

Awards
Preceded by Gyöngyi Likerecz	Hungarian Sportswoman of The Year; 2002–2003	Succeeded by Nataša Janić
