= Sanda Toma (canoeist) =

Romanian canoeist

Medal record

Women's canoe sprint

Representing Romania

Olympic Games
Bronze medal – third place	2000 Sydney	K-4 500 m

World Championships
Bronze medal – third place	1993 Copenhagen	K-2 5000 m

Sanda Toma (born March 17, 1970) is a Romanian sprint canoer who competed from the early 1990s to the early 2000s (decade). Competing in three Summer Olympics, she won a bronze medal in the K-4 500 m event at Sydney in 2000.

Toma also won a bronze medal in the K-2 5000 m event at the 1993 ICF Canoe Sprint World Championships in Copenhagen.
