= Olena Cherevatova =

Ukrainian sprint canoer (born 1970)

Medal record

Women's canoe sprint

Olympic Games
| Bronze medal – third place | 2004 Athens | K-4 500 m |

World Championships
| Silver medal – second place | 2003 Gainesville | K-4 1000 m |

European Championships
| Gold medal – first place | 2004 Poznań | K-4 500 m |

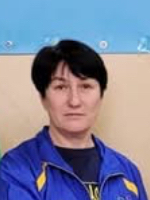

Olena Cherevatova (Ukrainian: Олена Череватова, born 17 July 1970) is a Ukrainian sprint canoer who competed in the 2000s. Competing in two Summer Olympics, she won a bronze medal in the K-4 500 m event at Athens in 2004.

Cherevatova also won a silver medal in the K-4 1000 m event at the 2003 ICF Canoe Sprint World Championships in Gainesville.
