= Erzsébet Viski =

Hungarian sprint canoer (born 1980)

Medal record

Women's canoe sprint

Representing Hungary

Olympic Games
Silver medal – second place	2000 Sydney	K-4 500 m
Silver medal – second place	2004 Athens	K-4 500 m

World Championships
Gold medal – first place	1998 Szeged	K-4 200 m
Gold medal – first place	1999 Milan	K-4 200 m
Gold medal – first place	1999 Milan	K-4 500 m
Gold medal – first place	2001 Poznań	K-4 200 m
Gold medal – first place	2001 Poznań	K-4 500 m
Gold medal – first place	2001 Poznań	K-4 1000 m
Gold medal – first place	2002 Seville	K-4 200 m
Gold medal – first place	2002 Seville	K-4 500 m
Gold medal – first place	2003 Gainesville	K-4 200 m
Gold medal – first place	2003 Gainesville	K-4 500 m
Gold medal – first place	2005 Zagreb	K-4 1000 m
Bronze medal – third place	2001 Poznań	K-2 200 m
Bronze medal – third place	2002 Seville	K-4 1000 m
Bronze medal – third place	2005 Zagreb	K-1 500 m

Erzsébet Viski (born 22 February 1980 in Kismaros) is a Hungarian sprint canoer who competed from 1998 to 2005. Competing in two Summer Olympics, she won two silver medals in the K-4 500 m event (2000, 2004).

Viski also won fourteen medals at the ICF Canoe Sprint World Championships with eleven golds (K-4 200 m: 1998, 1999, 2001, 2002, 2003; K-4 500 m: 1999, 2001, 2002, 2003; K-4 1000 m: 2001, 2005) and three bronzes (K-1 500 m: 2005, K-2 200 m: 2001, K-4 1000 m: 2002).
