= Hanna Balabanova =

Ukrainian sprint canoer (born 1969)

Medal record

Women's canoe sprint

Olympic Games
Bronze medal – third place	2004 Athens	K-4 500 m

World Championships
Bronze medal – third place	2001 Poznań	K-4 1000 m

European Championships
Gold medal – first place	2001 Milan	K-4 1000 m
Gold medal – first place	2004 Poznań	K-4 500 m

Hanna Balabanova (Ukrainian: Ганна Балабанова, born 10 December 1969) is a Ukrainian sprint canoeist who competed from the late 1990s to the mid-2000s (decade). Competing in three Summer Olympics, she won a bronze medal in the K-4 500 m event at Athens in 2004.

Balabanova also won a bronze medal in the K-4 1000 m event at the 2001 ICF Canoe Sprint World Championships in Poznań.
