= Szilvia Szabó =

Hungarian canoeist

Medal record

Women's canoe sprint

Olympic Games
Silver medal – second place	2000 Sydney	K-2 500 m
Silver medal – second place	2000 Sydney	K-4 500 m
Silver medal – second place	2004 Athens	K-4 500 m

World Championships
Gold medal – first place	1999 Milan	K-4 200 m
Gold medal – first place	1999 Milan	K-4 500 m
Gold medal – first place	2001 Poznań	K-2 500 m
Gold medal – first place	2001 Poznań	K-4 500 m
Gold medal – first place	2001 Poznań	K-4 1000 m
Gold medal – first place	2002 Seville	K-2 500 m
Gold medal – first place	2002 Seville	K-2 1000 m
Gold medal – first place	2002 Seville	K-4 200 m
Gold medal – first place	2002 Seville	K-4 500 m
Gold medal – first place	2003 Gainesville	K-2 500 m
Gold medal – first place	2003 Gainesville	K-4 200 m
Gold medal – first place	2003 Gainesville	K-4 500 m
Gold medal – first place	2005 Zagreb	K-4 1000 m
Silver medal – second place	1997 Dartmouth	K-4 500 m
Silver medal – second place	1998 Szeged	K-4 500 m
Silver medal – second place	2005 Zagreb	K-1 200 m
Bronze medal – third place	1999 Milan	K-2 500 m
Bronze medal – third place	2001 Poznań	K-1 200 m
Bronze medal – third place	2005 Zagreb	K-4 500 m

Szilvia Szabó (born 24 October 1978, in Budapest) is a Hungarian canoe sprinter who competed from 1997 to 2005. Competing in two Summer Olympics, she won three silvers (2000: K-2 500 m, K-4 500 m; 2004: K-4 500 m).

Szabó has also had outstanding success at the ICF Canoe Sprint World Championships, winning nineteen medals. This includes thirteen golds (K-2 500 m: 2001, 2002, 2003; K-2 1000 m: 2002, K-4 200 m: 1999, 2002, 2003; K-4 500 m: 1999, 2001, 2002, 2003; K-4 1000 m: 2001, 2005), three silvers (K-1 200 m: 2005, K-4 500 m: 1997, 1998), and three bronzes (K-1 200 m: 2001, K-2 500 m: 1999, K-4 500 m: 2005).
