= Raluca Ioniță =

Romanian canoeist

Medal record

Women's canoe sprint

Representing Romania

Olympic Games
Bronze medal – third place	2000 Sydney	K-4 500 m

Raluca Ionițǎ (born 9 June 1976 in Ploiești) is a Romanian sprint canoer who competed in the late 1990s and early 2000s (decade). Competing in two Summer Olympics, she won a bronze medal in the K-4 500 m event at Sydney in 2000.
