= Mariana Limbău =

Romanian canoeist (born 1977)

Medal record

Women's canoe sprint

Representing Romania

Olympic Games
Bronze medal – third place	2000 Sydney	K-4 500 m

Mariana Limbău (born August 25, 1977) is a Romanian sprint canoer who competed in the late 1990s and early 2000s. She won a bronze medal in the K-4 500 m event at the 2000 Summer Olympics in Sydney.
