= Tennis at the 1996 Summer Olympics – Men's doubles =

Men's doubles
- Tennis at the 1996 Summer Olympics

Final
- Champions: Todd Woodbridge (Australia) Mark Woodforde (AUS)
- Runners-up: Neil Broad (United Kingdom) Tim Henman (GBR)
- Score: 6–4, 6–4, 6–2

Events
Singles	men	women
Doubles	men	women
- Summer Olympics

Men's doubles at the Games of the XXVI Olympiad
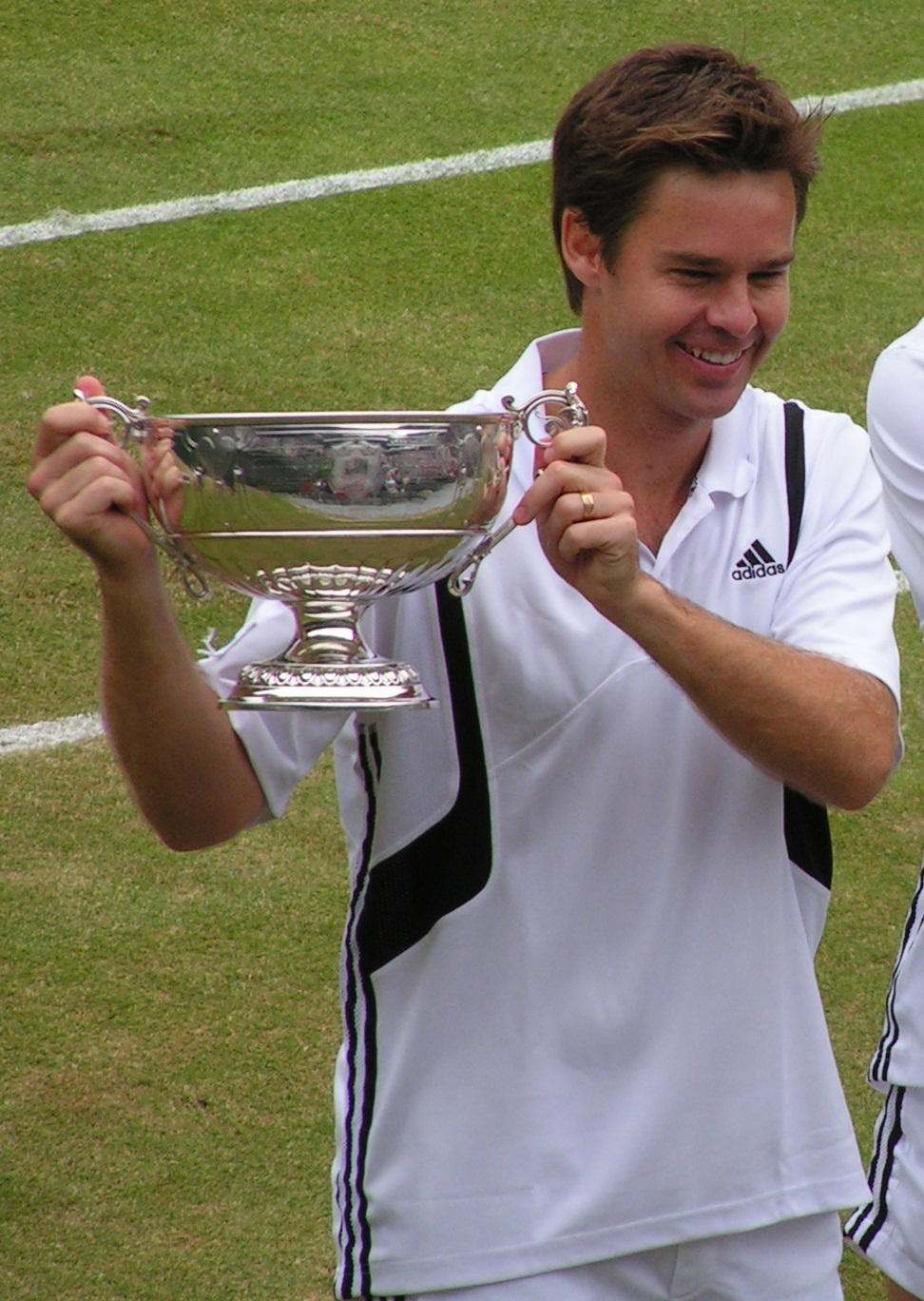
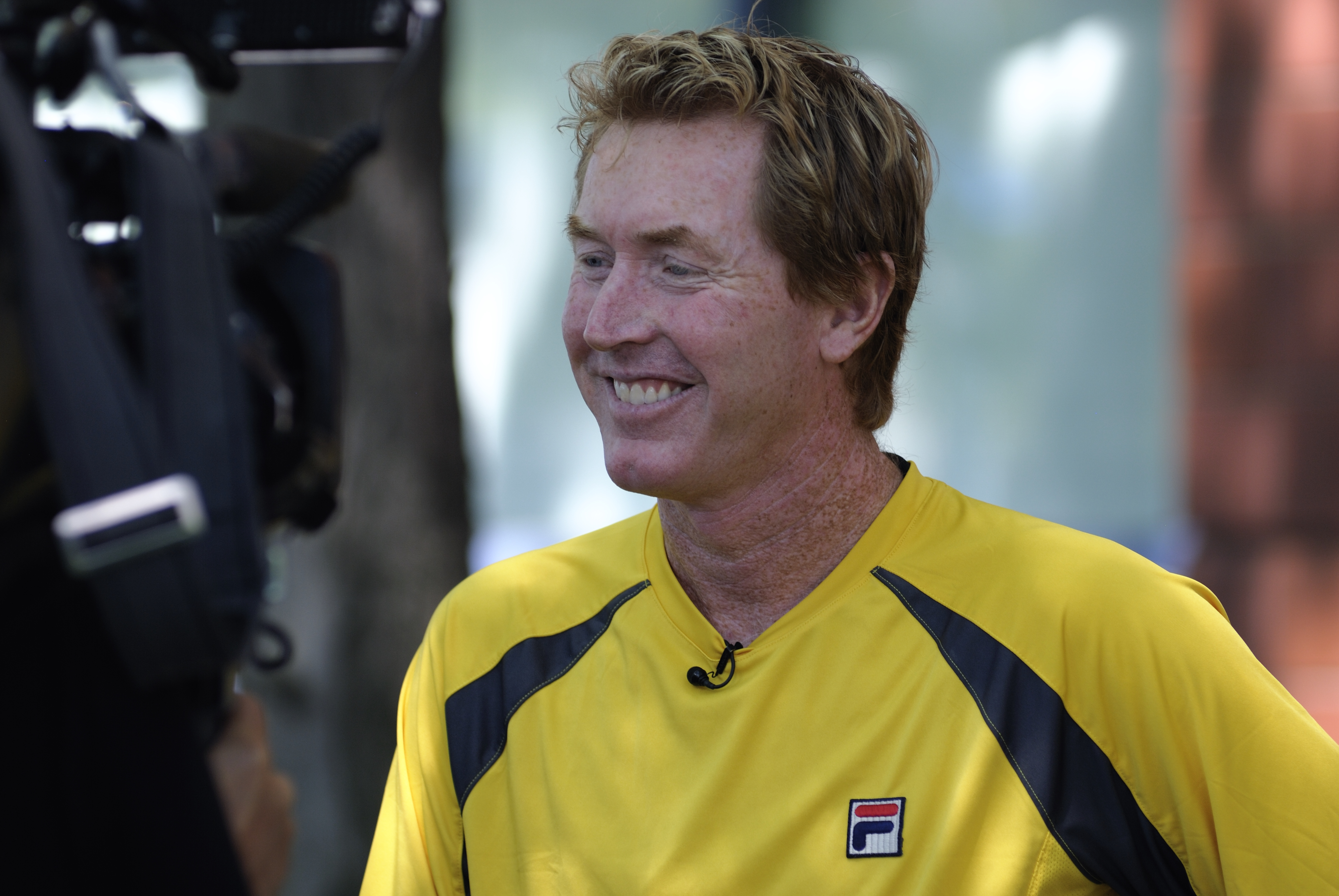
- Todd Woodbridge (2004) Mark Woodforde (2011)
- Venue: Stone Mountain Tennis Center
- Dates: 25 July – 2 August 1996
- Competitors: 31 teams (62 players) from 31 nations

Medalists
1st place, gold medalist(s)		Todd Woodbridge; Mark Woodforde; Australia
2nd place, silver medalist(s)		Neil Broad; Tim Henman; Great Britain
3rd place, bronze medalist(s)		Marc-Kevin Goellner; David Prinosil; Germany

Australia's Todd Woodbridge and Mark Woodforde defeated Great Britain's Neil Broad and Tim Henman in the final, 6–4, 6–4, 6–2 to win the gold medal in Men's Doubles tennis at the 1996 Summer Olympics. It was the fourth of five components the Woodies needed for the career Golden Slam; they would later win the French Open to complete the achievement. It was Australia's first official medal in the event, though Australian player Edwin Flack was a member of a mixed team that won bronze in the 1896 event. Great Britain earned its first medal in the men's doubles since 1924. In the bronze-medal match, Germany's Marc-Kevin Goellner and David Prinosil defeated the Netherlands' Jacco Eltingh and Paul Haarhuis, 6–2, 7–5. It was Germany's second consecutive medal in the event.

The tournament was held from 25 July to 2 August at the Stone Mountain Tennis Center, in Atlanta, Georgia of the United States of America. There were 31 pairs from 31 nations, with each nation limited to one pair (two players),though the pair from Uzbekistan did not start.

== Background ==
This was the 10th appearance of men's doubles tennis. The event has been held at every Summer Olympics where tennis has been on the program: from 1896 to 1924 and then from 1988 to the current program. A demonstration event was held in 1968.

This was the first Olympics at which Todd Woodbridge and Mark Woodforde played together. Woodbridge had played with John Fitzgerald in 1992. Since pairing with Woodforde, the Australians had won four consecutive Wimbledone titles. They were heavy favorites in the Olympic tournament. 1992 silver medalist Wayne Ferreira of South Africa returned, this time paired with (unrelated) Ellis Ferreira rather than Piet Norval. Bronze medalist Javier Frana of Argentina also returned with a new partner, Luis Lobo.

Chinese Taipei, the Czech Republic, Ecuador, the Ivory Coast, Slovakia, and Venezuela each made their debut in the event. Great Britain made its eighth appearance in the event, most of any nation.

== Competition format ==
The competition was a single-elimination tournament. A bronze-medal match was reintroduced after not being held in 1988 or 1992. All matches except the final were best-of-three sets, down from best-of-five in previous Games; the final remained best-of-five. Tiebreaks were used for any set before the final set that reached 6–6.

== Schedule ==
All times are Eastern Daylight Time (UTC-4)

Date	Time	Round
Thursday, 25 July 1996; Friday, 26 July 1996		Round of 32
Saturday, 27 July 1996; Sunday, 28 July 1996		Round of 16
Monday, 29 July 1996		Quarterfinals
Wednesday, 31 July 1996	11:00; 13:00	Semifinals
Thursday, 1 August 1996	17:00	Bronze medal match
Friday, 2 August 1996	15:00	Final

== Seeds ==
1. Todd Woodbridge / Mark Woodforde (AUS) (champions)
2. Grant Connell / Daniel Nestor (CAN) (second round)
3. Jacco Eltingh / Paul Haarhuis (NED) (semifinals)
4. Jonas Björkman / Nicklas Kulti (SWE) (first round)
5. Jiří Novák / Jan Vacek (CZE) (quarterfinals)
6. Ellis Ferreira / Wayne Ferreira (RSA) (quarterfinals)
7. Javier Frana / Luis Lobo (ARG) (first round)
8. Byron Black / Wayne Black (ZIM) (second round)

== Draw ==
Key

- Q = Qualifier
- WC = Wild card
- LL = Lucky loser
- Alt = Alternate
- ITF = ITF entry
- PR = Protected ranking
- SR = Special ranking
- SE = Special exempt
- JE = Junior exempt
- JR = Junior Accelerator Programme entrant
- CO = College Accelerator Programme entrant
- NG = Next Gen Accelerator Program entrant
- w/o = Walkover
- r = Retired
- d = Defaulted

=== Finals ===
Semifinals
1	Todd Woodbridge (AUS); Mark Woodforde (AUS)	6	5	18
3	Jacco Eltingh (NED); Paul Haarhuis (NED)	2	7	16
Marc-Kevin Goellner (GER); David Prinosil (GER)	6	3	8
Neil Broad (GBR); Tim Henman (GBR)	4	6	10

Final (gold-medal match)
1	Todd Woodbridge (AUS); Mark Woodforde (AUS)	6	6	6
Neil Broad (GBR); Tim Henman (GBR)	4	4	2
Bronze-medal match
3	Jacco Eltingh (NED); Paul Haarhuis (NED)	2	5
Marc-Kevin Goellner (GER); David Prinosil (GER)	6	7

==== Top half ====
First round
1	T Woodbridge (AUS); M Woodforde (AUS)	6	3	6
A Boetsch (FRA); G Raoux (FRA)	2	6	3
M Bhupathi (IND); L Paes (IND)	4	6	6
WC	B Pan (CHN); J Xia (CHN)	6	4	4
Alt	S Iwabuchi (JPN); T Suzuki (JPN)	4	7^{7}	8
J C Bianchi (VEN); N Pereira (VEN)	6	6^{5}	6
S Bruguera (ESP); T Carbonell (ESP)	6	7^{8}
7	J Frana (ARG); L Lobo (ARG)	3	6^{6}
3	J Eltingh (NED); P Haarhuis (NED)	6	6^{1}	6
WC	A Pavel (ROM); D Pescariu (ROM)	2	7^{7}	4
WC	Cla N'Goran (CIV); Cle N'Goran (CIV)	6	6
WC	C-J Chen (TPE); Y-H Lien (TPE)	2	2
Alt	A Agassi (USA); M Washington (USA)	6	4	6
Alt	A Hernández (MEX); Ó Ortiz (MEX)	3	6	4
G Köves (HUN); L Markovits (HUN)	1	1
6	E Ferreira (RSA); W Ferreira (RSA)	6	6

Second round
1	T Woodbridge (AUS); M Woodforde (AUS)	4	6	6
M Bhupathi (IND); L Paes (IND)	6	2	2
Alt	S Iwabuchi (JPN); T Suzuki (JPN)	7^{7}	2	5
S Bruguera (ESP); T Carbonell (ESP)	6^{1}	6	7
3	J Eltingh (NED); P Haarhuis (NED)	6	6
WC	Cla N'Goran (CIV); Cle N'Goran (CIV)	4	4
Alt	A Agassi (USA); M Washington (USA)	5	7^{7}	0
6	E Ferreira (RSA); W Ferreira (RSA)	7	6^{2}	6

Quarterfinals
1	T Woodbridge (AUS); M Woodforde (AUS)	6	6
S Bruguera (ESP); T Carbonell (ESP)	4	1
3	J Eltingh (NED); P Haarhuis (NED)	7^{7}	7^{7}
6	E Ferreira (RSA); W Ferreira (RSA)	6^{4}	6^{4}

Semifinals
1	T Woodbridge (AUS); M Woodforde (AUS)	6	5	18
3	J Eltingh (NED); P Haarhuis (NED)	2	7	16

==== Bottom half ====
First round
8	B Black (ZIM); W Black (ZIM)	6	6
WC	H-T Lee (KOR); Y-I Yoon (KOR)	4	2
M-K Goellner (GER); D Prinosil (GER)	4	6	7
A Gaudenzi (ITA); D Nargiso (ITA)	6	1	5
M Knowles (BAH); R Smith (BAH)	7^{8}	7^{7}
E Couto (POR); B Mota (POR)	6^{6}	6^{4}
S Hiršzon (CRO); G Ivanišević (CRO)	7^{7}	7^{7}
4	J Björkman (SWE); N Kulti (SWE)	6^{4}	6^{4}
5/Alt	J Novák (CZE); D Vacek (CZE)	w/o
WC	O Ogorodov (UZB); D Tomashevich (UZB)
Alt	K Carlsen (DEN); F Fetterlein (DEN)	4	6	3
Alt	P Campana (ECU); N Lapentti (ECU)	6	3	6
N Broad (GBR); T Henman (GBR)	6	6
WC	J Krošlák (SVK); K Kučera (SVK)	3	3
WC	S Barron (IRL); O Casey (IRL)	4	4
2	G Connell (CAN); D Nestor (CAN)	6	6

Second round
8	B Black (ZIM); W Black (ZIM)	4	6^{6}
M-K Goellner (GER); D Prinosil (GER)	6	7^{8}
M Knowles (BAH); R Smith (BAH)	6^{4}	3
S Hiršzon (CRO); G Ivanišević (CRO)	7^{7}	6
5/Alt	J Novák (CZE); D Vacek (CZE)	7	6
Alt	P Campana (ECU); N Lapentti (ECU)	5	4
N Broad (GBR); T Henman (GBR)	7^{7}	4	6
2	G Connell (CAN); D Nestor (CAN)	6^{5}	6	4

Quarterfinals
M-K Goellner (GER); D Prinosil (GER)	6	6
S Hiršzon (CRO); G Ivanišević (CRO)	2	3
5/Alt	J Novák (CZE); D Vacek (CZE)	6^{4}	4
N Broad (GBR); T Henman (GBR)	7^{7}	6

Semifinals
M-K Goellner (GER); D Prinosil (GER)	6	3	8
N Broad (GBR); T Henman (GBR)	4	6	10
