= Czech Republic at the 1996 Summer Olympics =

- IOC code: CZE
- NOC: Czech Olympic Committee
- Website: www.olympic.cz (in Czech and English)

in Atlanta
- Competitors: 115 (76 men and 39 women) in 17 sports
- Flag bearers: Václav Chalupa (opening); Jan Železný (closing)
- Medals Ranked 17th: Gold 4 Silver 3 Bronze 4 Total 11

Summer Olympics appearances (overview)
- 1996; 2000; 2004; 2008; 2012; 2016; 2020; 2024

Other related appearances
- Bohemia (1900–1912); Czechoslovakia (1924–1992)

The Czech Republic competed at the 1996 Summer Olympics in Atlanta, United States. It was the first Summer Games since the dissolution of Czechoslovakia, and so the Czech Republic and Slovakia competed as independent teams. 115 competitors, 76 men and 39 women, took part in 110 events in 17 sports.

== Medalists ==
The following Czech competitors won medals at the games. In the by discipline sections below, medalists' names are bolded.

Medal	Name	Sport	Event	Date
Gold	Štěpánka Hilgertová	Canoeing	Women's slalom K-1	July 27
Gold	Jan Železný	Athletics	Men's Javelin Throw	August 3
Gold	Martin Doktor	Canoeing	Men's C-1 1000 m	August 3
Gold	Martin Doktor	Canoeing	Men's C-1 500 m	August 4
Silver	Lukáš Pollert	Canoeing	Men's slalom C-1	July 27
Silver	Jiří Rohan; Miroslav Šimek	Canoeing	Men's slalom C-2	July 28
Silver	Jana Novotná; Helena Suková	Tennis	Women's doubles	August 3
Bronze	Miroslav Januš	Shooting	Men's 10 m running target	July 26
Bronze	Šárka Kašpárková	Athletics	Women's triple jump	July 31
Bronze	Tomáš Dvořák	Athletics	Men's decathlon	August 1
Bronze	Jana Novotná	Tennis	Women's singles	August 2

Medals by sport
**Sport**	1st place, gold medalist(s)	2nd place, silver medalist(s)	3rd place, bronze medalist(s)	**Total**
Athletics	1	0	2	**3**
Canoeing	3	2	0	**5**
Shooting	0	0	1	**1**
Tennis	0	1	1	**2**
Total	4	3	4	11

Medals by day
**Day**	**Date**	1st place, gold medalist(s)	2nd place, silver medalist(s)	3rd place, bronze medalist(s)	Total
7	July 26	0	0	1	1
8	July 27	1	1	0	2
9	July 28	0	1	0	1
12	July 31	0	0	1	1
13	August 1	0	0	1	1
14	August 2	0	0	1	1
15	August 3	2	1	0	3
16	August 4	1	0	0	1
Total		4	3	4	11

Medals by gender
**Gender**	1st place, gold medalist(s)	2nd place, silver medalist(s)	3rd place, bronze medalist(s)	**Total**	**Percentage**
Male	3	2	2	**7**	63.63%
Female	1	1	2	**4**	36.36%
Mixed	0	0	0	**0**	0.00%
Total	4	3	4	11	100%

Multiple medalists
**Name**	**Sport**	1st place, gold medalist(s)	2nd place, silver medalist(s)	3rd place, bronze medalist(s)	**Total**
Martin Doktor	Canoeing	2	0	0	**2**
Jana Novotná	Tennis	0	1	1	**2**

== Competitors ==
The following is the list of number of competitors participating in the Games:

Sport	Men	Women	Total
Athletics	14	9	23
Boxing	4	0	4
Canoeing	17	8	25
Cycling	4	2	6
Fencing	1	0	1
Gymnastics	1	3	4
Judo	2	2	4
Rowing	3	2	5
Sailing	2	0	2
Shooting	14	3	17
Swimming	3	7	10
Table Tennis	2	1	3
Tennis	2	2	4
Volleyball	2	0	2
Weightlifting	2	0	2
Wrestling	3	0	3
Total	76	39	115

== Athletics ==
Key

- Note–Ranks given for track events are within the athlete's heat only
- Q = Qualified for the next round
- q = Qualified for the next round as a fastest loser or, in field events, by position without achieving the qualifying target

Men

Track & road events

Athlete	Event	Heat			Quarterfinal			Semifinal			Final	
Athlete	Event	Time	Rank	Overall	Time	Rank	Overall	Time	Rank	Overall	Time	Rank
Pavel Soukup	800 m	1:47.67	3	32	—			Did not advance				
Tomáš Dvořák	110 m hurdles	13.78	6	33	Did not advance							
Jiří Malysa	20 km walk	—									1:25:13	25
Tomáš Kratochvíl	20 km walk	—									1:30:11	48
Hubert Sonnek	20 km walk	—									1:32:42	52
Miloš Holuša	50 km walk	—									4:03:16	27
Hubert Sonnek	50 km walk	—									DNF	

Field events

Athlete	Event	Qualification		Final	
Athlete	Event	Result	Rank	Result	Rank
Tomáš Janků	High jump	2.28	13 Q	2.25	14
Milan Gombala	Long jump	7.88	20	Did not advance	
Miroslav Menc	Shot put	18.69	21	Did not advance	
Marek Bílek	Discus throw	59.86	20	Did not advance	
Pavel Sedláček	Hammer throw	73.98	20	Did not advance	
Jan Železný	Javelin throw	86.52	2 Q	88.16	1st place, gold medalist(s)

Combined events – Decathlon

Athlete	Event	100 m	LJ	SP	HJ	400 m	110H	DT	PV	JT	1500 m	Points	Rank
Tomáš Dvořák	Result	10.64	7.60	15.82	1.98	48.29	13.79	46.28	4.70	70.16	4:31.25	8664	3rd place, bronze medalist(s)
Tomáš Dvořák	Points	942	960	840	785	895	1002	793	819	892	736	8664	3rd place, bronze medalist(s)
Robert Změlík	Result	10.83	7.64	13.53	1.95	49.55	14.17	43.44	5.40	67.20	4:38.45	8422	7
Robert Změlík	Points	899	970	700	758	835	953	735	1035	847	690	8422	7
Kamil Damašek	Result	10.86	7.22	15.51	2.01	47.35	14.94	42.66	4.90	55.84	4:25.86	8229	16
Kamil Damašek	Points	892	866	821	813	941	857	719	880	675	765	8229	16

Women

Track & road events

Athlete	Event	Heat			Quarterfinal			Semifinal			Final	
Athlete	Event	Time	Rank	Overall	Time	Rank	Overall	Time	Rank	Overall	Time	Rank
Hana Benešová	400 m	52.28	5	22 q	51.30	5	13	Did not advance				
Helena Fuchsová	400 m	51.71	2 Q	9	51.70	5	20	Did not advance				
Naděžda Koštovalová	400 m	53.03	4 Q	35	53.21	8	31	Did not advance				
Ludmila Formanová	800 m	1:59.37	3	7 q	—			1:59.28	5	12	Did not advance	
Naděžda Koštovalová; Ludmila Formanová; Helena Fuchsová; Hana Benešová	4 × 400 m relay	3:26.82	5	7 q	—						3:26.99	7

Field events

Athlete	Event	Qualification		Final	
Athlete	Event	Result	Rank	Result	Rank
Zuzana Kováčiková	High jump	1.93	13 q	1.93	11
Šárka Kašpárková	Triple jump	14.42	7 Q	14.98	3rd place, bronze medalist(s)
Zdeňka Šilhavá	Discus throw	59.24	19	Did not advance	
Alice Matějková	Discus throw	60.72	15	Did not advance	
Nikola Tomečková	Javelin throw	55.02	25	Did not advance	

== Boxing ==
Athlete	Event	Round of 32	Round of 16	Quarterfinals	Semifinals	Final	
Athlete	Event	Opposition Result	Opposition Result	Opposition Result	Opposition Result	Opposition Result	Rank
Jaroslav Konečný	Lightweight	Kabore (BUR); W 16–6	Wiangwiset (THA); L 6–20	Did not advance			9
Pavol Polakovič	Light middleweight	Kunene (RSA); W 8–1	Reid (USA); L 5–12	Did not advance			9
Ľudovít Plachetka	Middleweight	Mathunjawa (SWZ); W 20–4	Yarbekov (UZB); L 4–4 TB	Did not advance			9
Petr Horáček	Super heavyweight	Məmmədov (AZE); L RSC	Did not advance				17

== Canoeing ==
=== Slalom ===
Athlete	Event	Run 1			Run 2			Result	
Athlete	Event	Time	Points	Total	Time	Points	Total	Total	Rank
Lukáš Pollert	Men's C-1	151.17	0	151.17	158.25	20	178.25	151.17	2nd place, silver medalist(s)
Pavel Janda	Men's C-1	167.71 10	10	177.91	185.55	55	240.55	177.91	20
Miroslav Šimek; Jiří Rohan	Men's C-2	161.77	70	231.77	160.16	0	160.16	160.16	2nd place, silver medalist(s)
Petr Štercl; Pavel Štercl	Men's C-2	163.45	5	168.45	179.53	160	339.53	168.45	6
Luboš Hilgert	Men's K-1	146.10	5	151.10	146.99	50	196.99	151.10	18
Jiří Prskavec	Men's K-1	182.29	115	297.29	151.15	0	151.15	151.15	19
Štěpánka Hilgertová	Women's K-1	164.49	5	169.49	166.97	5	171.97	169.49	1st place, gold medalist(s)
Marcela Sadilová	Women's K-1	181.22	55	236.22	174.47	0	174.47	174.47	9
Irena Pavelková	Women's K-1	184.45	55	239.45	166.89	15	181.89	181.89	16

=== Sprint ===
Men

Athlete	Event	Heats		Repechage		Semifinals		Final	
Athlete	Event	Time	Rank	Time	Rank	Time	Rank	Time	Rank
Martin Doktor	C-1 500 m	1:52.907	1 F	—		Bye		1:49.934	1st place, gold medalist(s)
Martin Doktor	C-1 1000 m	4:19.918	1 F	—		Bye		3:54.418	1st place, gold medalist(s)
Pavel Bednář; Petr Fuksa	C-2 500 m	1:47.955	8 R	1:50.480	3 SF	1:44.902	6	Did not advance	
Pavel Bednář; Petr Fuksa	C-2 1000 m	4:25.295	8 SF	—		3:51.576	5	Did not advance	
Jiří Polívka; Karel Leština	K-2 500 m	1:34.107	6 R	1:37.119	2 SF	1:32.517	7	Did not advance	
Petr Hruška; René Kučera	K-2 1000 m	3:42.682	4 R	3:35.216	3 SF	3:21.384	7	Did not advance	
Karel Leština; Pavel Mráz; Martin Otáhal; Jiří Polívka	K-4 1000 m	3:19.868	7 SF	—		3:06.611	5	Did not advance	

Women

Athlete	Event	Heats		Repechage		Semifinals		Final	
Athlete	Event	Time	Rank	Time	Rank	Time	Rank	Time	Rank
Pavlína Jobánková	K-1 500 m	2:07.811	8 R	2:12.219	7	Did not advance			
Jitka Janáčková; Pavlína Jobánková	K-2 500 m	1:51.346	6 R	1:55.377	3 SF	1:49.125	7	Did not advance	
Jitka Janáčková; Kateřina Heková; Kateřina Hluchá; Milena Pergnerová	K-4 500 m	1:44.707	7 SF	—		1:42.216	5	Did not advance	

== Cycling ==
=== Road ===
Men

Athlete	Event	Time	Rank
Ján Svorada	Road race	4:56:44	30

=== Track ===
Sprint

Athlete	Event	Qualification		Round 1	Repechage	Round 2	Repechage 2	Round of 16	Repechage 3	Quarterfinals	Semifinals	Final	
Athlete	Event	Time Speed (km/h)	Rank	Opposition Time Speed (km/h)	Opposition Time Speed (km/h)	Opposition Time Speed (km/h)	Opposition Time Speed (km/h)	Opposition Time Speed (km/h)	Opposition Time Speed (km/h)	Opposition Time Speed (km/h)	Opposition Time Speed (km/h)	Opposition Time Speed (km/h)	Rank
Pavel Buráň	Men's sprint	10.389 (69.30)	7	Vassilopoulus (GRE); W 11.700 (61.54)	Bye	Himonetos (GRE); W 11.272 (63.86)	Bye	Hill (AUS); L	Magné (FRA); Bērziņš (LAT); L	Did not advance			9

=== Mountain bike ===
Athlete	Event	Time	Rank
Radovan Fořt	Men's cross-country	2:42:43	24
Pavel Camrda	Men's cross-country	2:49:09	33
Kateřina Neumannová	Women's cross-country	2:04:03	18
Kateřina Hanušová	Women's cross-country	2:04:05	19

== Fencing ==
One male fencer represented the Czech Republic in 1996.

Athlete	Event	Round of 64	Round of 32	Round of 16	Quarterfinal	Semifinal	Final / BM	
Athlete	Event	Opposition Score	Opposition Score	Opposition Score	Opposition Score	Opposition Score	Opposition Score	Rank
Roman Ječmínek	Men's épée	Chang (KOR); L 13–15	Did not advance					37

== Gymnastics ==
=== Artistic ===
Men

Athlete	Event	Apparatus																		Total	
Athlete	Event	Floor			Pommel horse			Rings			Vault			Parallel bars			Horizontal bar			Total	
Athlete	Event	C	O	Rank	C	O	Rank	C	O	Rank	C	O	Rank	C	O	Rank	C	O	Rank	Score	Rank
Jiří Fiřt	Team	8.875	8.825	87	9.300	8.925	70	9.325	9.150	68	9.425	9.250	63	8.450	9.100	83	8.425	9.462	77	108.512	58

Women

Athlete	Event	Apparatus												Total	
Athlete	Event	Vault			Uneven bars			Balance beam			Floor			Total	
Athlete	Event	C	O	Rank	C	O	Rank	C	O	Rank	C	O	Rank	Score	Rank
Gabriela Krčmárová	Team	9.325	9.262	73	8.987	8.975	84	8.162	8.912	84	9.050	9.437	74	72.110	67

=== Rhythmic ===
Individual

Athlete	Event	Preliminaries										Semifinal										Final									
Athlete	Event	Apparatus								Total		Apparatus								Total		Apparatus								Total	
Athlete	Event	Rope		Ball		Clubs		Ribbon		Total		Rope		Ball		Clubs		Ribbon		Total		Rope		Ball		Clubs		Ribbon		Total	
Athlete	Event	Score	Rank	Score	Rank	Score	Rank	Score	Rank	Score	Rank	Score	Rank	Score	Rank	Score	Rank	Score	Rank	Score	Rank	Score	Rank	Score	Rank	Score	Rank	Score	Rank	Score	Rank
Lenka Oulehlová	All-around	9.232	24	9.266	=18	9.266	=23	9.199	26	36.963	22	Did not advance																			
Andrea Šebestová	All-around	9.366	15	8.783	36	9.249	=26	9.200	=23	36.598	28	Did not advance																			

== Rowing ==
The Czech Republic had five rowers participate in three out of fourteen rowing events in 1996.

Men

Athlete	Event	Heat		Repechage		Semifinal		Final	
Athlete	Event	Time	Rank	Time	Rank	Time	Rank	Time	Rank
Václav Chalupa	Single sculls	7:35.48	1 SA/B	Bye		7:16.97	3 FA	6:55.65	5
Michal Vabroušek; Adam Michálek	Lightweight double sculls	7:16.07	5 R	6:30.34	3 SC/D	6:41.41	1 FC	6:53.14	13

Women

Athlete	Event	Heat		Repechage		Semifinal		Final	
Athlete	Event	Time	Rank	Time	Rank	Time	Rank	Time	Rank
Sabina Telenská; Hana Dariusová	Pair	7:54.72	4 R	8:01.50	1 Q	7:48.40	5 FB	7:20.24	8

Qualification legend: FA=Final A (medal); FB=Final B (non-medal); FC=Final C (non-medal); FD=Final D (non-medal); SA/B=Semifinal A/B; SC/D=Semifinal C/D; R=Repechage; Q=Qualified for the next round

== Swimming ==
Men

Athlete	Event	Heat		Final	
Athlete	Event	Time	Rank	Time	Rank
Rastislav Bizub	100 m backstroke	58.29	37	Did not advance	
Rastislav Bizub	200 m backstroke	2:04.55	24	Did not advance	
Daniel Málek	100 m breaststroke	1:02.46	9 FB	1:02.39 NR	10
Daniel Málek	200 m breaststroke	2:17.08	17	Did not advance	
Josef Horký	200 m butterfly	2:02.84	30	Did not advance	
Josef Horký	200 m individual medley	2:05.45	18	Did not advance	
Josef Horký	400 m individual medley	4:26.58 NR	13 FB	4:28.39	14

Women

Athlete	Event	Heat		Final	
Athlete	Event	Time	Rank	Time	Rank
Kristýna Kyněrová	100 m freestyle	58.03	34	Did not advance	
Kristýna Kyněrová	200 m freestyle	2:03.63	19	Did not advance	
Olga Šplíchalová	400 m freestyle	4:20.04	21	Did not advance	
Olga Šplíchalová	800 m freestyle	8:47.68	15	Did not advance	
Marcela Kubalčíková	100 m backstroke	1:05.48	24	Did not advance	
Marcela Kubalčíková	100 m butterfly	1:03.82	33	Did not advance	
Marcela Kubalčíková	200 m butterfly	2:19.38	27	Did not advance	
Kateřina Pivoňková	200 m backstroke	2:18.20	21	Did not advance	
Lenka Maňhalová	100 m breaststroke	1:12.72	29	Did not advance	
Lenka Maňhalová	200 m breaststroke	2:32.14	15 FB	2:29.96 NR	11
Lenka Maňhalová	200 m individual medley	2:18.43	20	Did not advance	
Pavla Chrástová	400 m individual medley	4:51.35	15 FB	4:56.23	16
Hana Černá	400 m individual medley	4:49.43	13 FB	4:46.78 NR	10
Hana Černá; Kristýna Kyněrová; Pavla Chrástová; Olga Šplíchalová	4 × 200 m freestyle relay	8:21.19 NR	15	Did not advance	
Kateřina Pivoňková; Lenka Maňhalová; Marcela Kubalčíková; Kristýna Kyněrová	4 × 100 m medley relay	4:21.05	20	Did not advance	

Qualification Legend: FA = Qualify to final (medal); FB = Qualify to final B (non-medal)

== Table tennis ==
Three Czech table tennis players qualified for the following events.

Athlete	Event	Group stage			Round of 16	Quarterfinal	Semifinal	Final / BM	
Athlete	Event	Opposition Result	Opposition Result	Opposition Result	Opposition Result	Opposition Result	Opposition Result	Opposition Result	Rank
Petr Korbel	Men's singles	Choi (PRK); W 2–1 (15–21, 21–16, 21–13)	Morales (CHI); W 2–0 (21–9, 21–11)	Gatien (FRA); W 2–0 (21–13, 21–19)	Hoyama (BRA); W 3–2 (17–21, 19–21, 21–17, 21–14, 21–13)	Saive (BEL); W 3–0 (21–10, 21–13, 21–19)	Wang (CHN); L 0–3 (21–23, 7–21, 16–21)	Roßkopf (GER); L 1–3 (17–21, 21–19, 18–21, 19–21)	4
Petr Korbel; Josef Plachý	Men's doubles	Matsushita / Shibutani (JPN); L 0–2 (16–21, 22–24)	Grujić / Lupulesku (SCG); L 0–2 (11–21, 19–21)	Olaleye / Toriola (NGR); L 0–2 (8–21, 18–21)	—	Did not advance			25
Jana Dobešová	Women's singles	Palina (RUS); L 0–2 (9–21, 17–21)	Koyama (JPN); L 0–2 (20–22, 20–22)	Alejo (DOM); W 2–0 (21–9, 21–7)	Did not advance				33

== Tennis ==
Men

Athlete	Event	Round of 64	Round of 32	Round of 16	Quarterfinals	Semifinals	Final / BM	
Athlete	Event	Opposition Score	Opposition Score	Opposition Score	Opposition Score	Opposition Score	Opposition Score	Rank
Jiří Novák	Singles	Furlan (ITA); W 6–4, 4–6, 3–6	Schwartzman (ARG); L 4–6, 5–7	Did not advance				
Daniel Vacek	Singles	Prinosil (GER); W 6–4, 2–6, 6–4	Olhovskiy (RUS); L 3–6, 6–7^{(1–7)}	Did not advance				
Jiří Novák; Daniel Vacek	Doubles	—	Ogorodov / Tomashevich (UZB); W RET	Campana / Lapentti (ECU); W 7–5, 6–4	Broad / Henman (GBR); L 6–7^{(4–7)}, 4–7	Did not advance		

Women

Athlete	Event	Round of 64	Round of 32	Round of 16	Quarterfinals	Semifinals	Final / BM	
Athlete	Event	Opposition Score	Opposition Score	Opposition Score	Opposition Score	Opposition Score	Opposition Score	Rank
Jana Novotná	Singles	Dragomir (ROM); W 6–4, 4–4 ret	Wiesner (AUT); W 6–4, 3–6, 6–3	Sugiyama (JPN); W 6–3, 6–4	Seles (USA); W 7–5, 3–6, 8–6	Sánchez Vicario (ESP); L 4–6, 6–1, 3–6	Fernández (USA); W 7–6^{(10–8)}, 6–4	3rd place, bronze medalist(s)
Helena Suková	Singles	de Swardt (RSA); L 6–7^{(4–6)}, 6–3, 5–7	Did not advance					
Jana Novotná; Helena Suková	Doubles	—	Kournikova / Makarova (RUS); W 6–2, 6–2	Basuki / Tedjakusuma (INA); W 6–2, 6–3	Hetherington / Hy-Boulais (CAN); W 6–2, 6–4	Martínez / Sánchez Vicario (ESP); W 6–2, 7–6^{(6–1)}	Fernández / Fernández (USA); L 6–7^{(6–8)}, 4–6	2nd place, silver medalist(s)

== Volleyball ==
=== Beach ===
Athlete	Event	Winner's bracket				Loser's bracket					Final round		
Athlete	Event	First round	Second round	Third round	Fourth round	First round	Second round	Third round	Fourth round	Fifth round	Semifinal	Final / BM	
Athlete	Event	Opposition Result	Opposition Result	Opposition Result	Opposition Result	Opposition Result	Opposition Result	Opposition Result	Opposition Result	Opposition Result	Opposition Result	Opposition Result	Rank
Marek Pakosta; Michal Palinek	Men's	Prieto / Yuste (ESP); W 15–11	Lopes / Neto (BRA); L 5–15	Did not advance		Everaert / Mulder (NED); W 15–6	Child / Heese (CAN); L 9–15	Did not advance					=13

== Weightlifting ==
Athlete	Event	Snatch		Clean & Jerk		Total	Rank
Athlete	Event	Result	Rank	Result	Rank	Total	Rank
Petr Stanislav	Men's 59 kg	112.0	10	142.5	10	255.0	10
Roman Polom	Men's 99 kg	160.0	16	187.5	18	347.5	19
