= Tennis at the 1996 Summer Olympics – Women's singles =

Women's singles
- Tennis at the 1996 Summer Olympics

Final
- Champion: Lindsay Davenport (USA)
- Runner-up: Arantxa Sánchez Vicario (ESP)
- Score: 7–6^{(10–8)}, 6–2

Events
Singles	men	women
Doubles	men	women
- Summer Olympics

Women's singles tennis at the Games of the XXVI Olympiad
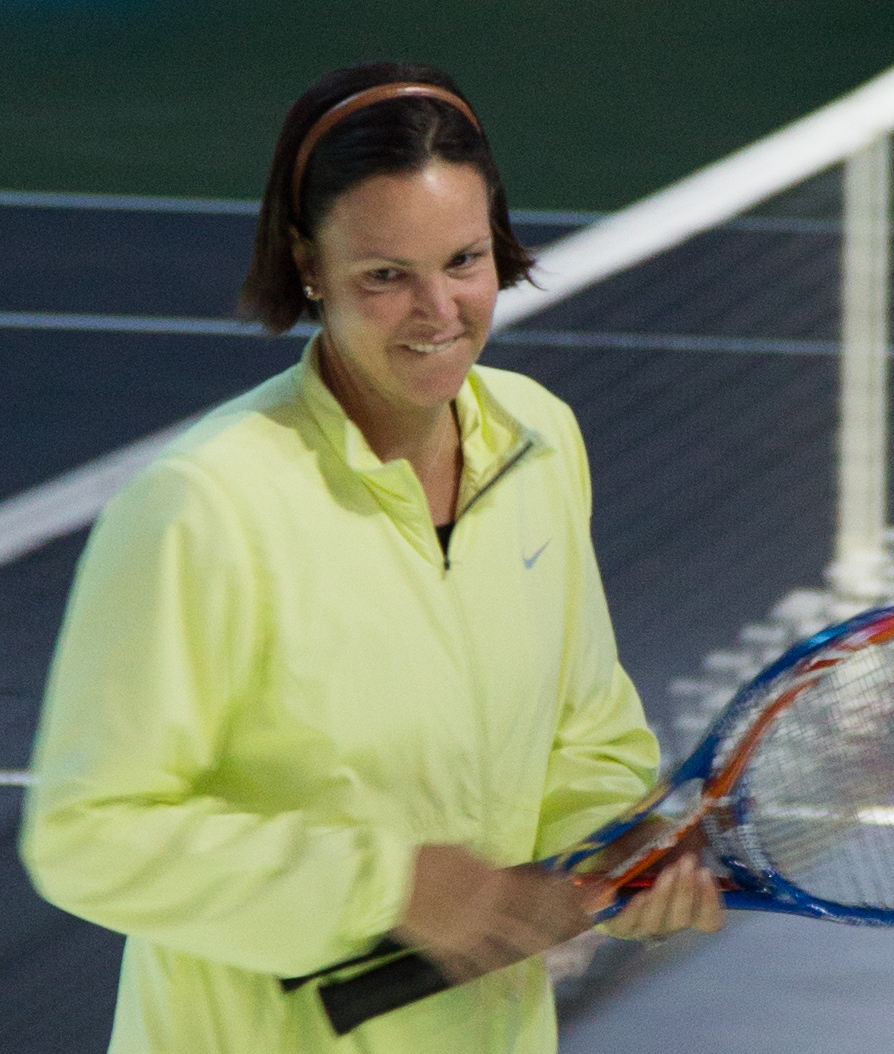
- Gold medalist Lindsay Davenport (2013)
- Venue: Stone Mountain Tennis Center
- Dates: 23 July–2 August 1996
- Competitors: 64 from 34 nations

Medalists
1st place, gold medalist(s)		Lindsay Davenport; United States
2nd place, silver medalist(s)		Arantxa Sánchez Vicario; Spain
3rd place, bronze medalist(s)		Jana Novotná; Czech Republic

The United States' Lindsay Davenport defeated Spain's Arantxa Sánchez Vicario in the final, 7–6^{(10–8)}, 6–2 to win the gold medal in Women's Singles tennis at the 1996 Summer Olympics. In the bronze-medal match, the Czech Republic's Jana Novotná defeated the United States' Mary Joe Fernández, 7–6^{(10–8)}, 6–4. Sánchez Vicario became the second woman to win multiple Olympic tennis medals in singles (following Steffi Graf in 1988 and 1992); Fernández would have done so as well, but the rules had been changed since the last Games to add a bronze medal playoff match.

The tournament was held from 23 July to 2 August at the Stone Mountain Tennis Center, in Atlanta, Georgia of the United States of America. There were 64 competitors from 34 nations, with each nation having up to three players.

Jennifer Capriati was the defending champion from 1992, but she chose not to participate.

== Background ==
This was the eighth appearance of the women's singles tennis. A women's event was held only once during the first three Games (only men's tennis was played in 1896 and 1904), but has been held at every Olympics for which there was a tennis tournament since 1908. Tennis was not a medal sport from 1928 to 1984, though there were demonstration events in 1968 and 1984.

Returning from the 1992 Games were both bronze medalists, Arantxa Sánchez Vicario of Spain and Mary Joe Fernández of the United States, as well as all four of the quarterfinal losers. Silver medalist (and 1988 champion) Steffi Graf was kept out by a knee injury. The U.S. team was strong even without defending champion Jennifer Capriati, with #1 seed Monica Seles, Fernandez, and Lindsay Davenport. Spain also sent a strong team, with Sánchez Vicario joined by Conchita Martínez as the next two seeds behind Seles.

Belarus, Chinese Taipei, Croatia, the Czech Republic, the Dominican Republic, Luxembourg, Russia, Slovakia, and Tunisia each made their debut in the event. France and Great Britain each made their seventh appearance, tied for most among nations to that point.

== Competition format ==
The competition was a single-elimination tournament, but with a significant change from 1988 and 1992. A bronze-medal match was held, unlike the previous two Games. Matches were best-of-three sets. The 12-point tie-breaker continued be used in any set, except the third, that reached 6–6.

== Schedule ==
All times are Eastern Daylight Time (UTC-4)

Date	Time	Round
Tuesday, 23 July 1996; Wednesday, 24 July 1996		Round of 64
Thursday, 25 July 1996; Friday, 26 July 1996		Round of 32
Saturday, 27 July 1996; Sunday, 28 July 1996		Round of 16
Monday, 29 July 1996		Quarterfinals
Wednesday, 31 July 1996	11:00; 13:00	Semifinals
Friday, 2 August 1996	11:00; 13:00	Bronze medal match Final

== Seeds ==
1. Monica Seles (USA) (quarterfinals)
2. Conchita Martínez (ESP) (quarterfinals)
3. Arantxa Sánchez Vicario (ESP) (final, silver medalist)
4. Iva Majoli (CRO) (quarterfinals)
5. Anke Huber (GER) (third round)
6. Jana Novotná (CZE) (semifinals, bronze medalist)
7. Mary Joe Fernández (USA) (semifinals, fourth place)
8. Kimiko Date (JPN) (quarterfinals)
9. Lindsay Davenport (USA) (champion)
10. Magdalena Maleeva (BUL) (third round)
11. Brenda Schultz-McCarthy (NED) (third round)
12. Mary Pierce (FRA) (second round)
13. Gabriela Sabatini (ARG) (third round)
14. Amanda Coetzer (RSA) (second round)
15. Martina Hingis (SUI) (second round)
16. Karina Habšudová (SVK) (third round)

== Draw ==
Key

- Q = Qualifier
- WC = Wild card
- LL = Lucky loser
- Alt = Alternate
- ITF = ITF entry
- PR = Protected ranking
- SR = Special ranking
- SE = Special exempt
- JE = Junior exempt
- JR = Junior Accelerator Programme entrant
- CO = College Accelerator Programme entrant
- NG = Next Gen Accelerator Program entrant
- w/o = Walkover
- r = Retired
- d = Defaulted

=== Finals ===
Quarterfinals
1	Monica Seles (USA)	5	6	6
6	Jana Novotná (CZE)	7	3	8
3	Arantxa Sánchez Vicario (ESP)	4	6	10
8	Kimiko Date (JPN)	6	3	8
9	Lindsay Davenport (USA)	7	6
4	Iva Majoli (CRO)	5	3
7/Alt	Mary Joe Fernández (USA)	3	6	6
2	Conchita Martínez (ESP)	6	2	3

Semifinals
6	Jana Novotná (CZE)	4	6	3
3	Arantxa Sánchez Vicario (ESP)	6	1	6
9	Lindsay Davenport (USA)	6	7
7/Alt	Mary Joe Fernández (USA)	2	6^{6}

Final (gold-medal match)
3	Arantxa Sánchez Vicario (ESP)	6^{8}	2
9	Lindsay Davenport (USA)	7	6
Bronze-medal match
6	Jana Novotná (CZE)	7	6
7/Alt	Mary Joe Fernández (USA)	6^{8}	4

=== Top half ===
==== Section 1 ====
First round
1	M Seles (USA)	6	6
WC	L-L Chen (CHN)	0	4
Alt	P Hy-Boulais (CAN)	6	6
R Grande (ITA)	4	4
Alt	A Gavaldón (MEX)	6	3	6
Alt	C Papadáki (GRE)	1	6	2
N Tauziat (FRA)	5	2
13	G Sabatini (ARG)	7	6
15	M Hingis (SUI)	6	6
WC	J Schad (DOM)	0	1
K Studeníková (SVK)	2	3
A Sugiyama (JPN)	6	6
J Wiesner (AUT)	7	6
Alt	A Temesvári (HUN)	6^{5}	4
R Dragomir (ROM)	4	4	r
6	J Novotná (CZE)	6	4

Second round
1	M Seles (USA)	6	6
Alt	P Hy-Boulais (CAN)	3	2
Alt	A Gavaldón (MEX)	4	0
13	G Sabatini (ARG)	6	6
15	M Hingis (SUI)	4	4
A Sugiyama (JPN)	6	6
J Wiesner (AUT)	4	6	3
6	J Novotná (CZE)	6	3	6

Third round
1	M Seles (USA)	6	6
13	G Sabatini (ARG)	3	3
A Sugiyama (JPN)	3	4
6	J Novotná (CZE)	6	6

Quarterfinals
1	M Seles (USA)	5	6	6
6	J Novotná (CZE)	7	3	8

==== Section 2 ====
First round
3	A Sánchez Vicario (ESP)	6	6
D Van Roost (BEL)	1	4
S Farina (ITA)	6	6
Alt	C Wood (GBR)	2	2
J Kruger (RSA)	7	2	1
WC	Y-J Choi (KOR)	6^{5}	6	6
WC	S Sfar (TUN)	4	0
11	B Schultz-McCarthy (NED)	6	6
10	M Maleeva (BUL)	6	6
WC	R Stubbs (AUS)	2	1
E Makarova (RUS)	2	5
F Labat (ARG)	6	7
Alt	V Csurgó (HUN)	6	7
WC	A Olsza (POL)	2	5
WC	D Randriantefy (MAD)	0	1
8	K Date (JPN)	6	6

Second round
3	A Sánchez Vicario (ESP)	6	6
S Farina (ITA)	1	3
WC	Y-J Choi (KOR)	2	3
11	B Schultz-McCarthy (NED)	6	6
10	M Maleeva (BUL)	7	6
F Labat (ARG)	6^{7}	1
Alt	V Csurgó (HUN)	2	3
8	K Date (JPN)	6	6

Third round
3	A Sánchez Vicario (ESP)	6	7
11	B Schultz-McCarthy (NED)	4	6^{7}
10	M Maleeva (BUL)	4	4
8	K Date (JPN)	6	6

Quarterfinals
3	A Sánchez Vicario (ESP)	4	6	10
8	K Date (JPN)	6	3	8

=== Bottom half ===
==== Section 3 ====
First round
5	A Huber (GER)	2	6	6
WC	C Cristea (ROM)	6	4	2
M de Swardt (RSA)	7	3	7
H Suková (CZE)	6^{4}	6	5
N Sawamatsu (JPN)	6	4	6
Alt	S-H Park (KOR)	3	6	3
WC	A Kremer (LUX)	2	1
9	L Davenport (USA)	6	6
16	K Habšudová (SVK)	6	6
Y Basuki (INA)	3	3
L Courtois (BEL)	1	6	6
WC	A Kournikova (RUS)	6	2	2
V Ruano Pascual (ESP)	6	6
Alt	M Grzybowska (POL)	4	2
N Bradtke (AUS)	6	3	4
4	I Majoli (CRO)	3	6	6

Second round
5	A Huber (GER)	3	6	6
M de Swardt (RSA)	6	1	4
N Sawamatsu (JPN)	2	2
9	L Davenport (USA)	6	6
16	K Habšudová (SVK)	7	6
L Courtois (BEL)	5	2
V Ruano Pascual (ESP)	5	3
4	I Majoli (CRO)	7	6

Third round
5	A Huber (GER)	1	6	3
9	L Davenport (USA)	6	3	6
16	K Habšudová (SVK)	4	6	4
4	I Majoli (CRO)	6	3	6

Quarterfinals
9	L Davenport (USA)	7	6
4	I Majoli (CRO)	5	3

==== Section 4 ====
First round
7/Alt	M J Fernández (USA)	6	6
E Likhovtseva (RUS)	2	4
S-T Wang (TPE)	7	7
Alt	A Serra Zanetti (ITA)	5	6^{5}
Alt	J-Q Yi (CHN)	2	6	1
WC	I Gorrochategui (ARG)	6	1	6
Alt	O Barabanschikova (BLR)	3	5
12	M Pierce (FRA)	6	7
14	A Coetzer (RSA)	6	7
WC	R McQuillan (AUS)	4	6^{5}
S Appelmans (BEL)	5	3
N Zvereva (BLR)	7	6
WC	R Zrubáková (SVK)	6	6
WC	J Nejedly (CAN)	3	2
WC	P Schnyder (SUI)	1	2
2	C Martínez (ESP)	6	6

Second round
7/Alt	M J Fernández (USA)	7	2	6
S-T Wang (TPE)	6^{4}	6	1
WC	I Gorrochategui (ARG)	6	1	7
12	M Pierce (FRA)	4	6	5
14	A Coetzer (RSA)	1	6	2
N Zvereva (BLR)	6	4	6
WC	R Zrubáková (SVK)	1	4
2	C Martínez (ESP)	6	6

Third round
7/Alt	M J Fernández (USA)	6	6
WC	I Gorrochategui (ARG)	0	3
N Zvereva (BLR)	2	5
2	C Martínez (ESP)	6	7

Quarterfinals
7/Alt	M J Fernández (USA)	3	6	6
2	C Martínez (ESP)	6	2	3
