= Tennis at the 1996 Summer Olympics – Men's singles =

Men's singles
- Tennis at the 1996 Summer Olympics

Final
- Champion: (United States) Andre Agassi
- Runner-up: (Spain) Sergi Bruguera
- Score: 6–2, 6–3, 6–1

Events
Singles	men	women
Doubles	men	women
- Summer Olympics

Men's singles tennis at the Games of the XXVI Olympiad
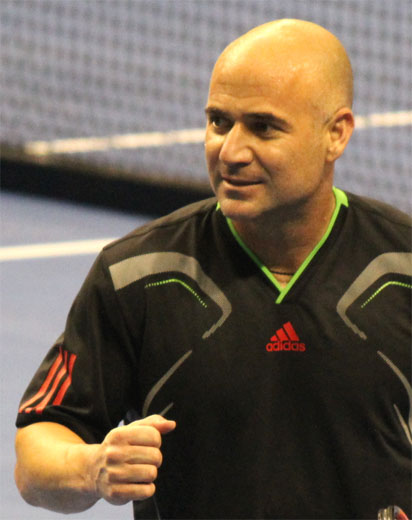
- Andre Agassi (2011)
- Venue: Stone Mountain Tennis Center, Atlanta
- Dates: 23 July–3 August 1996
- Competitors: 64 from 36 nations

Medalists
1st place, gold medalist(s)		Andre Agassi; United States
2nd place, silver medalist(s)		Sergi Bruguera; Spain
3rd place, bronze medalist(s)		Leander Paes; India

The United States' Andre Agassi defeated Spain's Sergi Bruguera in the final, 6–2, 6–3, 6–1 to win the gold medal in men's singles tennis at the 1996 Summer Olympics. The victory gave Agassi the fourth of five components of the Career Golden Slam; his later win at the 1999 French Open made him the first man to complete the Career Golden Slam in singles. Agassi would remain the sole man to complete the Career Golden Slam for over a decade, Rafael Nadal would join him in 2010. It was the United States' first gold medal in the event since 1924 and its third overall, equaling Great Britain's record. It was Spain's second consecutive silver medal. In the bronze medal match, India's Leander Paes defeated Brazil's Fernando Meligeni, 3–6, 6–2, 6–4. It was India's first Olympic tennis medal.

The tournament was held at the Stone Mountain Tennis Center in Atlanta, Georgia, United States. There were 64 competitors from 36 nations. Nations had been limited to three players each since the return of tennis to the Olympic program in 1988, with the number increased to four before the next games.

Switzerland's Marc Rosset was the reigning gold medalist from 1992, but he retired from his third round match against Renzo Furlan.

== Background ==
This was the 10th (medal) appearance of the men's singles tennis event. The event has been held at every Summer Olympics where tennis has been on the program: from 1896 to 1924 and then from 1988 to the current program. Demonstration events were held in 1968 and 1984.

The number one seed was Andre Agassi of the United States. Two of the eight quarterfinalists from the 1992 tournament returned: gold medalist Marc Rosset of Switzerland and bronze medalist Goran Ivanišević of Croatia.

Armenia, the Czech Republic, Ecuador, Slovakia, Uruguay, Uzbekistan, and Venezuela each made their debut in the event. France made its ninth appearance, most among all nations, having missed only the 1904 event.

== Competition format ==
The competition was a single-elimination tournament, but with some significant changes from 1988 and 1992. A bronze medal match was held, unlike the previous two Games. Matches before the final were reduced to best-of-three sets instead of best-of-five sets. The 12-point tie-breaker continued be used in any set, except the third (or the fifth in the final), that reached 6–6.

== Schedule ==
All times are Eastern Daylight Time (UTC-4)

Date	Time	Round
Tuesday, 23 July 1996; Wednesday, 24 July 1996		Round of 64
Thursday, 25 July 1996; Friday, 26 July 1996		Round of 32
Saturday, 27 July 1996; Sunday, 28 July 1996		Round of 16
Tuesday, 30 July 1996		Quarterfinals
Thursday, 1 August 1996	11:00; 13:00	Semifinals
Saturday, 3 August 1996	11:00; 13:00	Bronze medal match Final

== Seeds ==
1. Andre Agassi (USA) (champion)
2. Goran Ivanišević (CRO) (first round)
3. Thomas Enqvist (SWE) (third round)
4. MaliVai Washington (USA) (quarterfinals)
5. Wayne Ferreira (RSA) (quarterfinals)
6. Albert Costa (ESP) (second round)
7. Arnaud Boetsch (FRA) (second round)
8. Marc Rosset (SUI) (third round)
9. Jan Siemerink (NED) (first round)
10. Jason Stoltenberg (AUS) (second round)
11. Richey Reneberg (USA) (first round)
12. Paul Haarhuis (NED) (first round)
13. Magnus Gustafsson (SWE) (second round)
14. Renzo Furlan (ITA) (quarterfinals)
15. Carlos Costa (ESP) (first round)
16. Daniel Vacek (CZE) (second round)

== Draw ==
Key

- Q = Qualifier
- WC = Wild card
- LL = Lucky loser
- Alt = Alternate
- ITF = ITF entry
- PR = Protected ranking
- SR = Special ranking
- SE = Special exempt
- JE = Junior exempt
- JR = Junior Accelerator Programme entrant
- CO = College Accelerator Programme entrant
- NG = Next Gen Accelerator Program entrant
- w/o = Walkover
- r = Retired
- d = Defaulted

=== Finals ===
Quarterfinals
1	Andre Agassi (USA)	7	4	7
5	Wayne Ferreira (RSA)	5	6	5
WC	Leander Paes (IND)	6	7
14	Renzo Furlan (ITA)	1	5
Sergi Bruguera (ESP)	7^{10}	4	7
4	MaliVai Washington (USA)	6^{8}	6	5
Alt	Fernando Meligeni (BRA)	6^{5}	7	6
WC	Andrei Olhovskiy (RUS)	7^{7}	5	3

Semifinals
1	Andre Agassi (USA)	7^{7}	6
WC	Leander Paes (IND)	6^{5}	3
Sergi Bruguera (ESP)	7^{11}	6
Alt	Fernando Meligeni (BRA)	6^{9}	2

Final (gold medal match)
1	Andre Agassi (USA)	6	6	6
Sergi Bruguera (ESP)	2	3	1
Bronze medal match
WC	Leander Paes (IND)	3	6	6
Alt	Fernando Meligeni (BRA)	6	2	4

=== Top half ===
==== Section 1 ====
First round
1	A Agassi (USA)	7^{8}	7^{7}
J Björkman (SWE)	6^{6}	6^{5}
K Kučera (SVK)	6	2	6
WC	D Tomashevich (UZB)	3	6	0
WC	D Pescariu (ROM)	2	2
Alt	O Ortiz (MEX)	6	6
A Gaudenzi (ITA)	6	6
15	C Costa (ESP)	3	2
9	J Siemerink (NED)	2	4
T Woodbridge (AUS)	6	6
S Matsuoka (JPN)	6^{4}	3
T Henman (GBR)	7^{7}	6
B Black (ZIM)	6	3	6
Alt	G Raoux (FRA)	3	6	2
WC	G Etlis (ARG)	4	3
5	W Ferreira (RSA)	6	6

Second round
1	A Agassi (USA)	6	6
K Kučera (SVK)	4	4
Alt	O Ortiz (MEX)	1	6^{5}
A Gaudenzi (ITA)	6	7^{7}
T Woodbridge (AUS)	7^{8}	7^{7}
T Henman (GBR)	6^{6}	6^{5}
B Black (ZIM)	2	5
5	W Ferreira (RSA)	6	7

Third round
1	A Agassi (USA)	2	6	6
A Gaudenzi (ITA)	6	4	2
T Woodbridge (AUS)	6^{3}	6^{5}
5	W Ferreira (RSA)	7^{7}	7^{7}

Quarterfinals
1	A Agassi (USA)	7	4	7
5	W Ferreira (RSA)	5	6	5

==== Section 2 ====
First round
3	T Enqvist (SWE)	7^{7}	4	6
Alt	M-K Goellner (GER)	6^{4}	6	4
WC	S Sargsian (ARM)	6	6
WC	D Nestor (CAN)	4	4
Alt	N Pereira (VEN)	6	6
H Gumy (ARG)	4	0
WC	L Paes (IND)	6^{2}	7^{9}	1
11/Alt	R Reneberg (USA)	7^{7}	6^{7}	0r
14	R Furlan (ITA)	4	6	6
J Novák (CZE)	6	4	3
WC	L Morejón (ECU)	7^{7}	5	1
Alt	M Filippini (URU)	6^{3}	7	6
Alt	F Fetterlein (DEN)	6	4	8
J Eltingh (NED)	4	6	6
WC	H Arazi (MAR)	2	3
8	M Rosset (SUI)	6	6

Second round
3	T Enqvist (SWE)	4	7^{7}	6
WC	S Sargsian (ARM)	6	6^{2}	4
Alt	N Pereira (VEN)	2	3
WC	L Paes (IND)	6	6
14	R Furlan (ITA)	7	6
Alt	M Filippini (URU)	5	2
Alt	F Fetterlein (DEN)	6^{5}	5
8	M Rosset (SUI)	7^{7}	7

Third round
3	T Enqvist (SWE)	5	6^{3}
WC	L Paes (IND)	7	7^{7}
14	R Furlan (ITA)	6	4
8	M Rosset (SUI)	0	2	r

Quarterfinals
WC	L Paes (IND)	6	7
14	R Furlan (ITA)	1	5

=== Bottom half ===
==== Section 3 ====
First round
7	A Boetsch (FRA)	6	7^{7}
B Steven (NZL)	2	6^{2}
WC	A Pavel (ROM)	6	1	6
S Bruguera (ESP)	2	6	8
J Frana (ARG)	6	5	3
G Rusedski (GBR)	4	7	6
WC	R Agénor (HAI)	2	4
13	M Gustafsson (SWE)	6	6
10	J Stoltenberg (AUS)	7^{7}	6
WC	S Ladipo (NGR)	6^{4}	3
K Carlsen (DEN)	7	6
Alt	M Knowles (BAH)	5	3
Alt	S Noszály (HUN)	5	6^{6}
Alt	O Ogorodov (UZB)	7	7^{8}
Alt	J Krošlák (SVK)	3	6^{3}
4	M Washington (USA)	6	7^{7}

Second round
7	A Boetsch (FRA)	6^{7}	6	2
S Bruguera (ESP)	7^{9}	4	6
G Rusedski (GBR)	6^{4}	7^{7}	6
13	M Gustafsson (SWE)	7^{7}	6^{3}	3
10	J Stoltenberg (AUS)	2	6	3
K Carlsen (DEN)	6	3	6
Alt	O Ogorodov (UZB)	3	4
4	M Washington (USA)	6	6

Third round
S Bruguera (ESP)	7^{9}	6
G Rusedski (GBR)	6^{7}	3
K Carlsen (DEN)	7^{10}	0	2
4	M Washington (USA)	6^{8}	6	6

Quarterfinals
S Bruguera (ESP)	7^{10}	4	7
4	M Washington (USA)	6^{8}	6	5

==== Section 4 ====
First round
6	A Costa (ESP)	7^{13}	6
WC	S Lareau (CAN)	6^{11}	4
Alt	F Meligeni (BRA)	6	6
S Pescosolido (ITA)	4	2
WC	W Black (ZIM)	6^{4}	6	6
WC	J Szymanski (VEN)	7^{7}	4	3
M Philippoussis (AUS)	7^{7}	7^{7}
12	P Haarhuis (NED)	6^{4}	6^{2}
16	D Vacek (CZE)	6	2	6
D Prinosil (GER)	4	6	4
Alt	N Lapentti (ECU)	1	6	6
WC	A Olhovskiy (RUS)	6	3	8
WC	A Hernández (MEX)	3	6	6
C Ruud (NOR)	6	2	8
Alt	M Ondruska (RSA)	6	6
2	G Ivanišević (CRO)	2	4

Second round
6	A Costa (ESP)	6^{5}	4
Alt	F Meligeni (BRA)	7^{7}	6
WC	W Black (ZIM)	4	2
M Philippoussis (AUS)	6	6
16	D Vacek (CZE)	3	6^{1}
WC	A Olhovskiy (RUS)	6	7^{7}
C Ruud (NOR)	7^{8}	7^{7}
Alt	M Ondruska (RSA)	6^{6}	6^{1}

Third round
Alt	F Meligeni (BRA)	7^{9}	4	8
M Philippoussis (AUS)	6^{7}	6	6
WC	A Olhovskiy (RUS)	6	6
C Ruud (NOR)	4	3

Quarterfinals
Alt	F Meligeni (BRA)	6^{5}	7	6
WC	A Olhovskiy (RUS)	7^{7}	5	3
