= Tennis at the 1996 Summer Olympics – Women's doubles =

Women's doubles
- Tennis at the 1996 Summer Olympics

Final
- Champions: Gigi Fernández (United States) Mary Joe Fernández (USA)
- Runners-up: Jana Novotná (Czech Republic) Helena Suková (CZE)
- Score: 7–6^{(8–6)}, 6–4

Events
Singles	men	women
Doubles	men	women
← 1992 ·	Summer Olympics	· 2000 →

Defending gold medalists Gigi Fernández and Mary Joe Fernández of the United States successfully defended their title, defeating the Czech Republic's Jana Novotná and Helena Suková in the final, 7–6^{(8–6)}, 6–4 to win the gold medal in Women's Doubles tennis at the 1996 Summer Olympics. In the bronze-medal match, Spain's Conchita Martínez and Arantxa Sánchez Vicario defeated the Netherlands' Manon Bollegraf and Brenda Schultz-McCarthy, 6–1, 6–3.

The tournament was held at the Stone Mountain Tennis Center in Atlanta, of the United States. There were 62 competitors from 31 countries. Countries had been limited to one team each since the return of tennis to the Olympic program in 1988.

== Medalists ==
Gold	Gigi Fernández / Mary Joe Fernández; United States
Silver	Jana Novotná / Helena Suková; Czech Republic
Bronze	Conchita Martínez / Arantxa Sánchez Vicario; Spain

== Seeds ==
The top seeded team received a bye into the second round.

1. Gigi Fernández / Mary Joe Fernández (USA) (champions)
2. Jana Novotná / Helena Suková (CZE) (final, silver medalists)
3. Manon Bollegraf / Brenda Schultz-McCarthy (NED) (semifinals, fourth place)
4. Conchita Martínez / Arantxa Sánchez Vicario (ESP) (semifinals, bronze medalists)
5. Nicole Bradtke / Rennae Stubbs (AUS) (first round, withdrew)
6. Gabriela Sabatini / Patricia Tarabini (ARG) (first round)
7. Amanda Coetzer / Mariaan de Swardt (RSA) (second round)
8. Kyōko Nagatsuka / Ai Sugiyama (JPN) (first round)

== Draw ==
=== Key ===
- Q = Qualifier
- WC = Wild card
- LL = Lucky loser
- Alt = Alternate
- SE = Special exempt
- PR = Protected ranking
- ITF = ITF entry
- JE = Junior exempt
- w/o = Walkover
- r = Retired
- d = Defaulted
- SR = Special ranking

=== Finals ===
Semifinals
1	Gigi Fernández (USA); Mary Joe Fernández (USA)	7	7
3	Manon Bollegraf (NED); Brenda Schultz-McCarthy (NED)	5	6^{3}
4	Conchita Martínez (ESP); Arantxa Sánchez Vicario (ESP)	2	6^{1}
2	Jana Novotná (CZE); Helena Suková (CZE)	6	7

Final (gold-medal match)
1	Gigi Fernández (USA); Mary Joe Fernández (USA)	7	6
2	Jana Novotná (CZE); Helena Suková (CZE)	6^{6}	4
Bronze-medal match
3	Manon Bollegraf (NED); Brenda Schultz-McCarthy (NED)	1	3
4	Conchita Martínez (ESP); Arantxa Sánchez Vicario (ESP)	6	6

=== Top half ===
First round
Alt	M Pierce (FRA); N Tauziat (FRA)	6	3	6
M Grzybowska (POL); A Olsza (POL)	2	6	0
V Lake (GBR); C Wood (GBR)	3	7	6
WC	K Maleeva (BUL); M Maleeva (BUL)	6	6^{8}	3
WC	E-H Kim (KOR); S-H Park (KOR)	1	3
7	A Coetzer (RSA); M de Swardt (RSA)	6	6
3	M Bollegraf (NED); B Schultz-McCarthy (NED)	w/o
O Lugina (UKR); N Medvedeva (UKR)
V Csurgó (HUN); A Temesvári (HUN)	6	1	6
WC	P Cabezas (CHI); B Castro (CHI)	4	6	3
WC	M Hingis (SUI); P Schnyder (SUI)	3	6	6
K Habšudová (SVK); R Zrubáková (SVK)	6	4	2
S Appelmans (BEL); L Courtois (BEL)	5	6	6
6	G Sabatini (ARG); P Tarabini (ARG)	7	3	4

Second round
1	G Fernández (USA); MJ Fernández (USA)	6	6
Alt	M Pierce (FRA); N Tauziat (FRA)	4	3
V Lake (GBR); C Wood (GBR)	7	7
7	A Coetzer (RSA); M de Swardt (RSA)	5	5
3	M Bollegraf (NED); B Schultz-McCarthy (NED)	7	7
V Csurgó (HUN); A Temesvári (HUN)	6^{5}	6^{5}
WC	M Hingis (SUI); P Schnyder (SUI)	2	6	7
S Appelmans (BEL); L Courtois (BEL)	6	1	5

Quarterfinals
1	G Fernández (USA); MJ Fernández (USA)	6	6
V Lake (GBR); C Wood (GBR)	2	1
3	M Bollegraf (NED); B Schultz-McCarthy (NED)	6	6
WC	M Hingis (SUI); P Schnyder (SUI)	4	3

Semifinals
1	G Fernández (USA); MJ Fernández (USA)	7	7
3	M Bollegraf (NED); B Schultz-McCarthy (NED)	5	6^{3}

=== Bottom half ===
First round
5	N Bradtke (AUS); R Stubbs (AUS)
Alt	L-L Chen (CHN); J-Q Yi (CHN)	w/o
WC	B Sangaram (THA); T Tanasugarn (THA)	6	6^{3}	6
C Papadáki (GRE); C Zachariadou (GRE)	2	7	2
I Majoli (CRO); M Murić (CRO)	7	4	9
S Farina (ITA); L Golarsa (ITA)	6^{2}	6	7
WC	D Randriantefy (MAD); N Randriantefy (MAD)	1	3
4	C Martínez (ESP); A Sánchez Vicario (ESP)	6	6
8	K Nagatsuka (JPN); A Sugiyama (JPN)	6^{2}	1
J Hetherington (CAN); P Hy-Boulais (CAN)	7	6
WC	O Barabanschikova (BLR); N Zvereva (BLR)	6	6
M D'Agostini (BRA); V Menga (BRA)	2	3
WC	Y Basuki (INA); R Tedjakusuma (INA)	w/o
C Cristea (ROM); R Dragomir (ROM)
A Kournikova (RUS); E Makarova (RUS)	2	2
2	J Novotná (CZE); H Suková (CZE)	6	6

Second round
Alt	L-L Chen (CHN); J-Q Yi (CHN)	6	4	4
WC	B Sangaram (THA); T Tanasugarn (THA)	2	6	6
I Majoli (CRO); M Murić (CRO)	2	1
4	C Martínez (ESP); A Sánchez Vicario (ESP)	6	6
J Hetherington (CAN); P Hy-Boulais (CAN)	2	6	6
WC	O Barabanschikova (BLR); N Zvereva (BLR)	6	4	1
WC	Y Basuki (INA); R Tedjakusuma (INA)	2	3
2	J Novotná (CZE); H Suková (CZE)	6	6

Quarterfinals
WC	B Sangaram (THA); T Tanasugarn (THA)	2	1
4	C Martínez (ESP); A Sánchez Vicario (ESP)	6	6
J Hetherington (CAN); P Hy-Boulais (CAN)	2	4
2	J Novotná (CZE); H Suková (CZE)	6	6

Semifinals
4	C Martínez (ESP); A Sánchez Vicario (ESP)	2	6^{1}
2	J Novotná (CZE); H Suková (CZE)	6	7
