= Todd Woodbridge =

Australian tennis player (born 1971)

Todd Woodbridge OAM
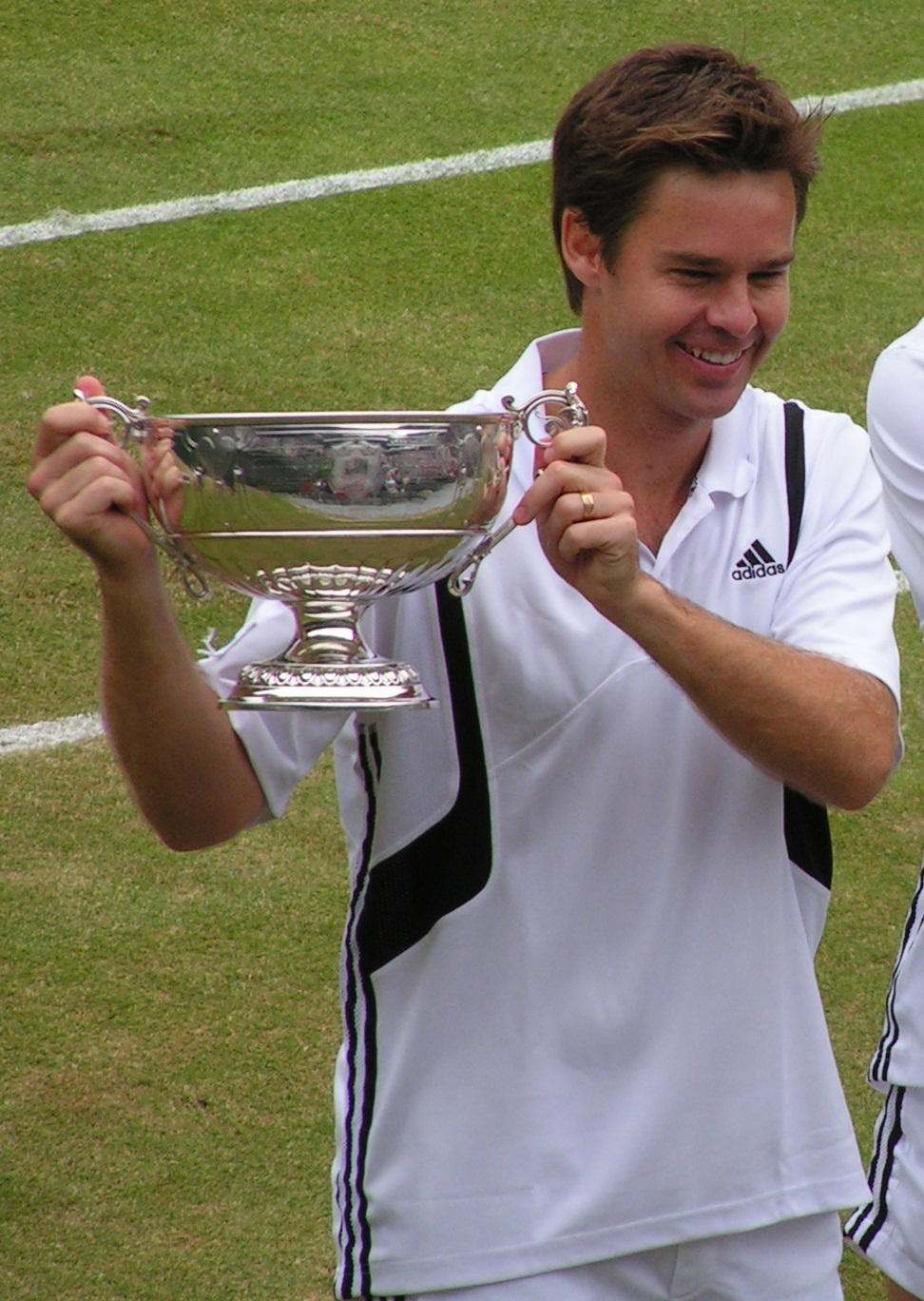
- Woodbridge at the 2004 Wimbledon Championships
- Full name: Todd Andrew Woodbridge
- Country (sports): Australia
- Residence: Sydney, New South Wales, Australia
- Born: 2 April 1971 (age 55) Sydney, New South Wales, Australia
- Height: 178 cm (5 ft 10 in)
- Turned pro: 1988
- Retired: 2005
- Plays: Right-handed (one-handed backhand)
- Prize money: US$ 10,078,820
- Int. Tennis HoF: 2010 (member page)

Singles
- Career record: 244–236
- Career titles: 2
- Highest ranking: No. 19 (14 July 1997)

Grand Slam singles results
- Australian Open: 4R (1991, 1998)
- French Open: 3R (1992, 1996, 1998)
- Wimbledon: SF (1997)
- US Open: 3R (1991, 1994, 1995)

Other tournaments
- Grand Slam Cup: QF (1991)
- Olympic Games: 3R (1996)

Doubles
- Career record: 782–260
- Career titles: 83
- Highest ranking: No. 1 (6 July 1992)

Grand Slam doubles results
- Australian Open: W (1992, 1997, 2001)
- French Open: W (2000)
- Wimbledon: W (1993, 1994, 1995, 1996, 1997, 2000, 2002, 2003, 2004)
- US Open: W (1995, 1996, 2003)

Other doubles tournaments
- Tour Finals: W (1992, 1996)

Mixed doubles
- Career titles: 6

Grand Slam mixed doubles results
- Australian Open: W (1993)
- French Open: W (1992)
- Wimbledon: W (1994)
- US Open: W (1990, 1993, 2001)
Medal record
Representing Australia
Olympic Games
Gold medal – first place	1996 Atlanta	Doubles
Silver medal – second place	2000 Sydney	Doubles

Todd Andrew Woodbridge, OAM (born 2 April 1971) is an Australian broadcaster and former professional tennis player. During his playing career, he formed multiple Grand-Slam winning doubles partnerships with Mark Woodforde (together, nicknamed "The Woodies") and later Jonas Björkman.

He is among the most successful doubles players of all time, having won 16 Grand Slam men's doubles titles (nine Wimbledons, three US Opens, three Australian Opens and one French Open), and a further six Grand Slam mixed doubles titles (three US Opens, one French Open, one Wimbledon, one Australian Open). Additionally, he was a gold medalist with Woodforde at the 1996 Summer Olympics to complete a career Golden Slam. In total he has won 83 ATP doubles titles. Woodbridge reached the World No. 1 doubles ranking in July 1992.

Woodbridge was awarded the Medal of the Order of the Australia in the 1997 Australia Day Honours "for service to sport as gold medallist at the Atlanta Olympic Games, 1996". In 2002, he was inducted into the Australian Institute of Sport 'Best of the Best'. In 2014, alongside Woodforde, the International Tennis Federation (ITF) presented him with its highest accolade, the Philippe Chatrier Award, for his contributions to tennis.

== Tennis career ==
=== Juniors ===
In juniors, Woodbridge made the finals of the Junior Australian Open in 1987 and 1989, and Wimbledon in 1989.

=== Pro tour ===
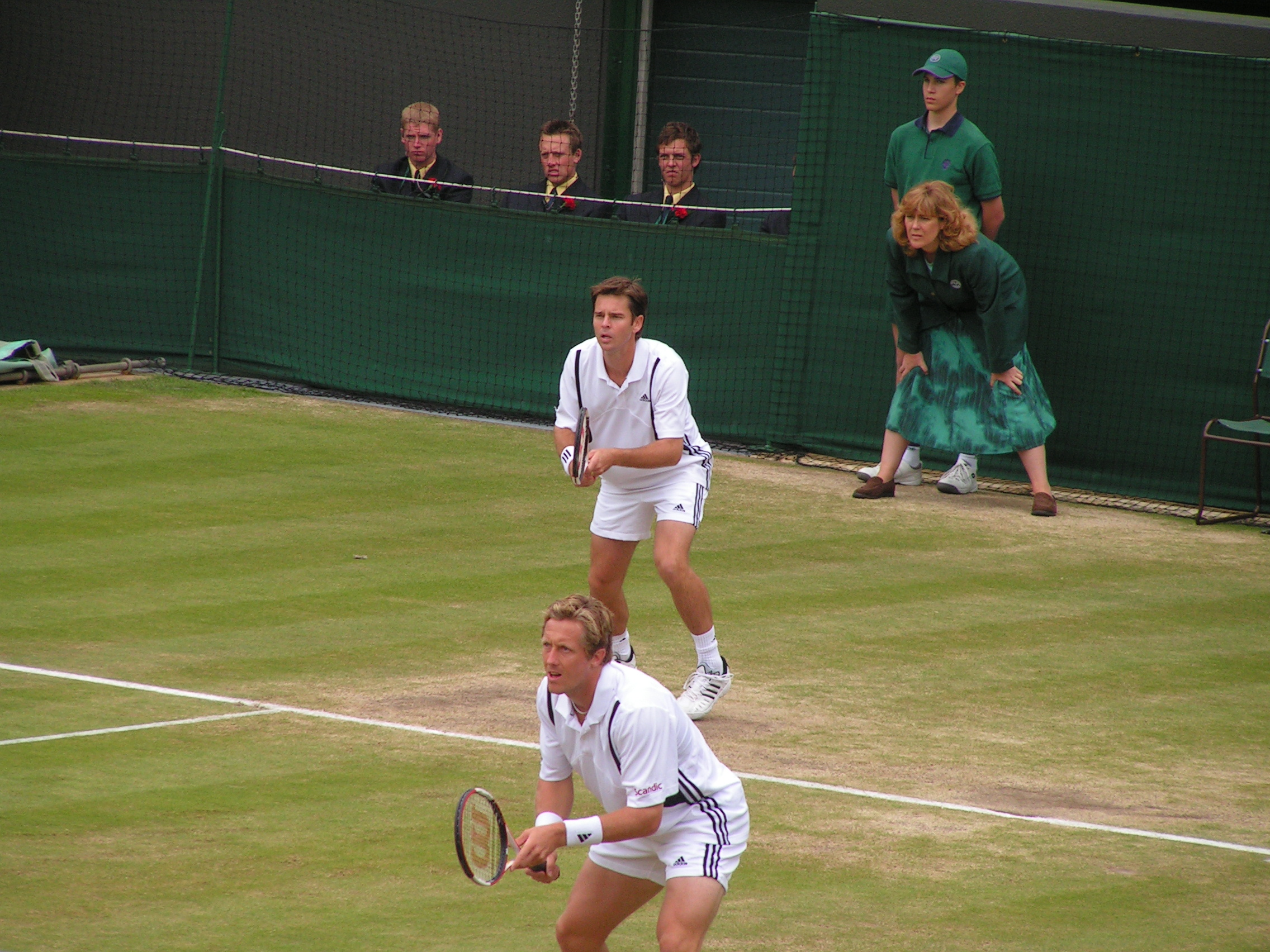
Björkman and Woodbridge at Wimbledon 2004

He is best known as one of the top doubles players in the world for most of the 1990s and into the early 2000s (decade). His primary doubles partnerships were first with fellow Australian Mark Woodforde and later with Swede Jonas Björkman. Woodbridge and Woodforde are often referred to as "The Woodies" in the tennis world. Woodbridge also had a career high singles ranking of 19 after reaching the semifinals of Wimbledon in 1997, beating Michael Chang, Marcos Ondruska, Alex Rădulescu, Patrick Rafter and Nicolas Kiefer before losing to Pete Sampras. He did however have the distinction of being one of only seven players to beat Sampras at Wimbledon, knocking him out in the first round in 1989 (Sampras's first ever Wimbledon match). Woodbridge is also notable for being one of only 17 players in the Open Era (as of 2017) to achieve a triple bagel, against Johan Örtegren in qualifying at the 2001 Wimbledon Championships.

The Woodies won a record 61 ATP doubles titles as a team, including 11 Grand Slam events. Woodforde and Woodbridge won a gold medal at the 1996 Atlanta Olympics, and reached the final to win a silver medal at the 2000 Sydney Olympics. In the fourth set tie-breaker against Canadians Sébastien Lareau and Daniel Nestor, Woodbridge served a double fault to lose the match.

After Woodforde retired from the tour in 2000, Woodbridge established a partnership with Björkman that resulted in five Grand Slam titles in four years. At the end of 2004, Björkman ended his partnership with Woodbridge. According to an interview Woodbridge granted to the Australian Broadcasting Corporation, Björkman wanted him to play more weeks on the tour, but Woodbridge wanted to limit his time away from his family as much as possible. Woodbridge then took on India's Mahesh Bhupathi as his new partner, who had just been dumped by Belarusian Max Mirnyi. Coincidentally, Björkman and Mirnyi ended up partnering together.

Woodbridge announced his retirement at the 2005 Wimbledon Championships after 17 years as a tennis professional and 83 ATP tournament doubles titles, an all-time record at the time now surpassed by the Bryan brothers. He was a member of the Australian Davis Cup Team, playing the most ties (32) of any player. According to the ATP website, he finished his career with US$10,095,245 in prize money.

== Post-playing career ==
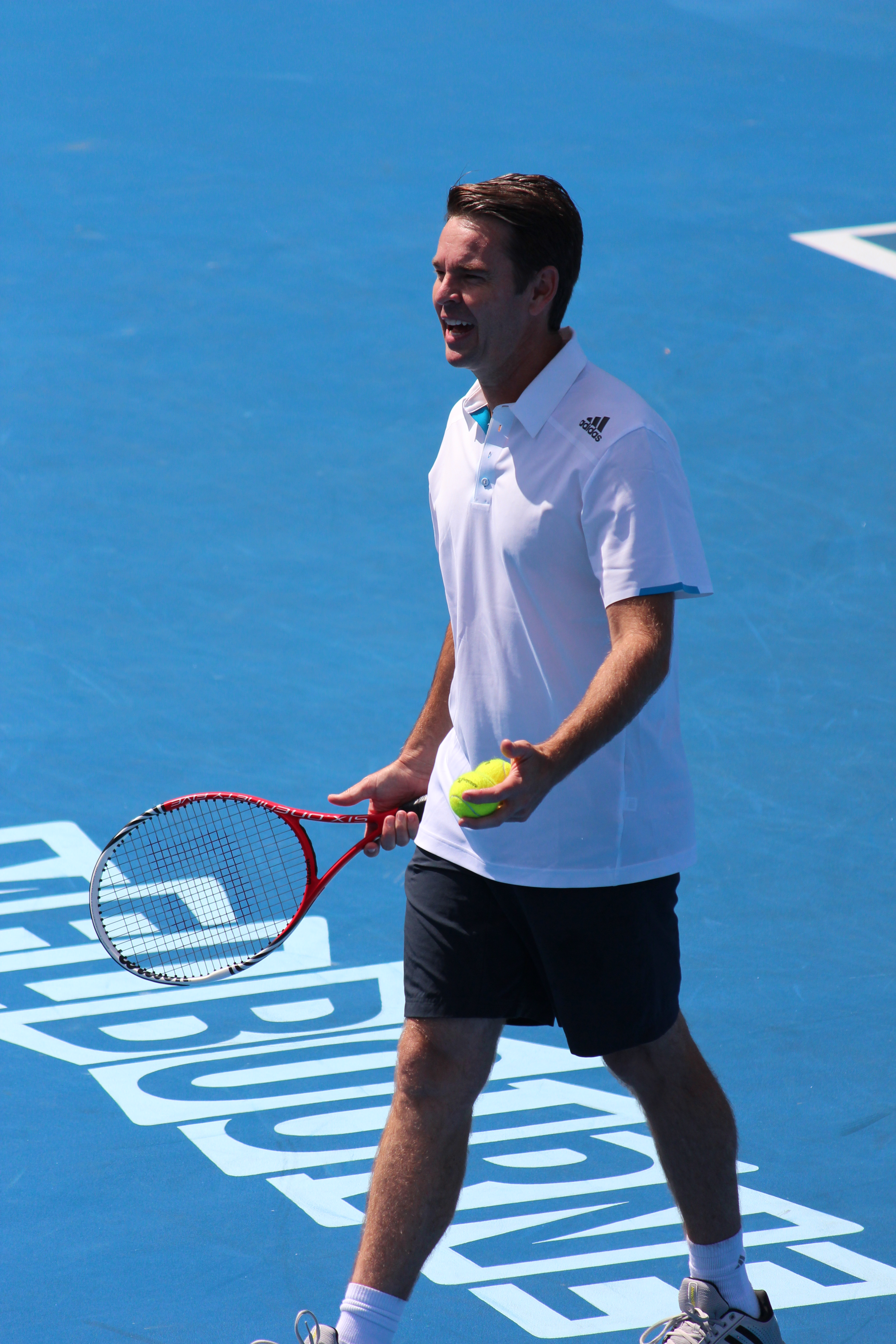
Woodbridge at the 2015 Australian Open

Woodbridge was a personality of the Seven Network from 2006 to 2018, working for Seven Sport as a tennis analyst/commentator/host on the network's summer of tennis coverage, including the Australian Open.

He also became an ambassador for bowel cancer awareness group "Let's Beat Bowel Cancer".

In 2007, he competed on the sixth season of Dancing with the Stars being the fourth contestant eliminated on 20 March that year. In 2008 and 2009, Woodbridge aligned himself closely to the sailing community through his commitments at Hamilton Island Race Week hosting tennis clinics and wine tasting events.

In 2008, he presented the History Channel's special The History of Australian Sport: Tennis, a documentary looking back at Australia's love affair with the roots of the Grand Slam of the Asia Pacific.

Woodbridge served as the tournament director for the 2009 Australian Open legends event. In July 2009, he was appointed coach of the Australian Davis Cup Team, taking on a newly expanded, full-time position that merges a role as the national men's coach overseeing the male player development pathway with the Davis Cup coaching job.

On 26 January 2010 (Australia Day), Woodbridge and Woodford (the Woodies) were inducted to the Australian Tennis Hall of Fame for their achievements in tennis. As a part of the induction ceremony, their bronzed statues were placed with other great Australian tennis players at the Melbourne Park. In July 2010 The Woodies were inducted to the International Tennis Hall of Fame. In January 2011, Woodbridge was confronted on court by Belgian player Kim Clijsters for comments he made via SMS to Rennae Stubbs alleging Clijsters was pregnant. In June that year, Woodbridge started anchoring the Seven Network's Wimbledon coverage. In 2016, he anchored overnight sessions of the Rio Olympics for Seven. Woodbridge has also been involved in other programs for Seven, including golf broadcasts. In April 2018, he hosted the morning sessions of the 2018 Commonwealth Games on the Gold Coast. Seven's 2018 Wimbledon telecast would be his final duties at the network, before defecting to arch-rival Nine, which he later said on-air was a "big decision" for him after being "very comfortable" being a part of the Seven family for years.

Later in 2018, it was announced Woodbridge had been signed by the Nine Network for Wide World of Sports, namely to feature as part of their Australian Open, after winning the lucrative broadcast rights for six years, shaking-up Australia's sports broadcasting landscape for the first time in more than four decades, as well as The Ashes. He is currently a fill-in sport presenter on Nine News Melbourne. Woodbridge has reported on the network's PGA Tour telecasts.

Woodbridge has been a presenter on Victorian travel show Postcards since 2022 and has also featured on various other network and local GTV-9 programming, such as Today and a Millionaire Hot Seat special focusing on Wimbledon.

Woodbridge had planned to compete in the 2021 Margaret Court Cup in Albury, but was prevented from doing so by domestic border closures.

On 10 August 2023, reports emerged that Woodbridge had been appointed as the host of an Australian version of Tipping Point Australia for the network, after Millionaire Hot Seat was axed on 4 August 2023. It is the first internationally licensed version of the popular UK program of the same name. It was confirmed by Nine in September. The first 'sneak peek' episode debuted on Christmas Eve 2023. The show officially premiered on 29 January 2024.

In August 2025, Woodbridge won the Bert Newton Award Silver Logie for Most Popular Presenter at the 65th Annual TV Week Logie Awards for his work between 2024 and 2025 hosting Tipping Point Australia, the Paris Olympics & Paralympics and commentating the Australian Open.

== Personal life ==
He was born in Sydney and raised in Woolooware by his parents, Kevin and Barbara. He has two older brothers, Gregory and Warren. He attended Woolooware High School, then turned professional in 1988.

Todd Woodbridge and Natasha Provis were married on 8 April 1995 in Melbourne; they have two children, Zara and Beau.

He suffered a non-fatal heart attack in October 2022.

== Grand Slam finals ==
=== Doubles: 20 (16 titles, 4 runner-ups) ===
Result	No.	Year	Championship	Surface	Partner	Opponents	Score
Win	1–0	1992	Australian Open	Hard	(Australia) Mark Woodforde	(United States) Kelly Jones (United States) Rick Leach	6–4, 6–3, 6–4
Win	2–0	1993	Wimbledon	Grass	(Australia) Mark Woodforde	(Canada) Grant Connell (United States) Patrick Galbraith	7–5, 6–3, 7–6^{(7–4)}
Win	3–0	1994	Wimbledon (2)	Grass	(Australia) Mark Woodforde	(Canada) Grant Connell (United States) Patrick Galbraith	7–6, 6–3, 6–1
Loss	3–1	1994	US Open	Hard	(Australia) Mark Woodforde	(Netherlands) Jacco Eltingh (Netherlands) Paul Haarhuis	3–6, 6–7^{(6–8)}
Win	4–1	1995	Wimbledon (3)	Grass	(Australia) Mark Woodforde	(United States) Rick Leach (United States) Scott Melville	7–5, 7–6^{(10–8)}, 7–6^{(7–5)}
Win	5–1	1995	US Open	Hard	(Australia) Mark Woodforde	(United States) Alex O'Brien (Australia) Sandon Stolle	6–3, 6–3
Win	6–1	1996	Wimbledon (4)	Grass	(Australia) Mark Woodforde	(Zimbabwe) Byron Black (Canada) Grant Connell	4–6, 6–1, 6–3, 6–2
Win	7–1	1996	US Open (2)	Hard	(Australia) Mark Woodforde	(Netherlands) Jacco Eltingh (Netherlands) Paul Haarhuis	4–6, 7–6, 7–6
Win	8–1	1997	Australian Open (2)	Hard	(Australia) Mark Woodforde	(Canada) Sébastien Lareau (United States) Alex O'Brien	4–6, 7–5, 7–5, 6–3
Loss	8–2	1997	French Open	Clay	(Australia) Mark Woodforde	(Russia) Yevgeny Kafelnikov (Czech Republic) Daniel Vacek	6–7^{(12–14)}, 6–4, 3–6
Win	9–2	1997	Wimbledon (5)	Grass	(Australia) Mark Woodforde	(Netherlands) Jacco Eltingh (Netherlands) Paul Haarhuis	7–6, 7–6, 5–7, 6–3
Loss	9–3	1998	Australian Open	Hard	(Australia) Mark Woodforde	(Sweden) Jonas Björkman (Netherlands) Jacco Eltingh	2–6, 7–5, 6–2, 4–6, 3–6
Loss	9–4	1998	Wimbledon	Grass	(Australia) Mark Woodforde	(Netherlands) Jacco Eltingh (Netherlands) Paul Haarhuis	6–2, 4–6, 6–7^{(3–7)}, 7–5, 8–10
Win	10–4	2000	French Open	Clay	(Australia) Mark Woodforde	(Netherlands) Paul Haarhuis (Australia) Sandon Stolle	7–6, 6–4
Win	11–4	2000	Wimbledon (6)	Grass	(Australia) Mark Woodforde	(Netherlands) Paul Haarhuis (Australia) Sandon Stolle	6–3, 6–4, 6–1
Win	12–4	2001	Australian Open (3)	Hard	(Sweden) Jonas Björkman	(Zimbabwe) Byron Black (Germany) David Prinosil	6–1, 5–7, 6–4, 6–4
Win	13–4	2002	Wimbledon (7)	Grass	(Sweden) Jonas Björkman	(The Bahamas) Mark Knowles (Canada) Daniel Nestor	6–1, 6–2, 6–7^{(7–9)}, 7–5
Win	14–4	2003	Wimbledon (8)	Grass	(Sweden) Jonas Björkman	(India) Mahesh Bhupathi (Belarus) Max Mirnyi	3–6, 6–3, 7–6^{(7–4)}, 6–3
Win	15–4	2003	US Open (3)	Hard	(Sweden) Jonas Björkman	(United States) Bob Bryan (United States) Mike Bryan	5–7, 6–0, 7–5
Win	16–4	2004	Wimbledon (9)	Grass	(Sweden) Jonas Björkman	(Austria) Julian Knowle (Serbia and Montenegro) Nenad Zimonjić	6–1, 6–4, 4–6, 6–4

=== Mixed doubles: 14 (6 titles, 8 runner-ups) ===
Result	Year	Championship	Surface	Partner	Opponents	Score
Win	1990	US Open	Hard	(Australia) Elizabeth Sayers Smylie	(United States) Jim Pugh (Soviet Union) Natasha Zvereva	6–4, 6–2
Loss	1992	Australian Open	Hard	(Spain) Arantxa Sánchez Vicario	(Australia) Mark Woodforde (Australia) Nicole Provis	3–6, 6–4, 9–11
Win	1992	French Open	Clay	(Spain) Arantxa Sánchez Vicario	(United States) Bryan Shelton (United States) Lori McNeil	6–2, 6–3
Win	1993	Australian Open	Hard	(Spain) Arantxa Sánchez Vicario	(United States) Rick Leach (United States) Zina Garrison	7–5, 6–4
Win	1993	US Open (2)	Hard	(Czech Republic) Helena Suková	(Australia) Mark Woodforde (United States) Martina Navratilova	6–3, 7–6
Loss	1994	Australian Open	Hard	(Czech Republic) Helena Suková	(Russia) Andrei Olhovskiy (Latvia) Larisa Savchenko Neiland	5–7, 7–6^{(9–7)}, 2–6
Win	1994	Wimbledon	Grass	(Czech Republic) Helena Suková	(United States) T. J. Middleton (United States) Lori McNeil	3–6, 7–5, 6–3
Loss	1994	US Open	Hard	(Czech Republic) Jana Novotná	(United States) Patrick Galbraith (South Africa) Elna Reinach	2–6, 4–6
Loss	2000	Australian Open	Hard	(Spain) Arantxa Sánchez Vicario	(United States) Jared Palmer (Australia) Rennae Stubbs	5–7, 6–7^{(3–7)}
Loss	2000	French Open	Clay	(Australia) Rennae Stubbs	(South Africa) David Adams (South Africa) Mariaan de Swardt	3–6, 6–3, 3–6
Win	2001	US Open (3)	Hard	(Australia) Rennae Stubbs	(India) Leander Paes (United States) Lisa Raymond	6–4, 5–7, 7–6
Loss	2003	Australian Open	Hard	(Greece) Eleni Daniilidou	(India) Leander Paes (United States) Martina Navrátilová	4–6, 5–7
Loss	2004	Wimbledon	Grass	(Australia) Alicia Molik	(Zimbabwe) Wayne Black (Zimbabwe) Cara Black	6–3, 6–7, 4–6
Loss	2004	US Open	Hard	(Australia) Alicia Molik	(United States) Bob Bryan (Russia) Vera Zvonareva	3–6, 4–6

== Career finals ==
=== Singles: 9 (2–7) ===
Result	No.	Date	Tournament	Surface	Opponent	Score
Loss	1.	Aug 1990	New Haven, US	Hard	(United States) Derrick Rostagno	3–6, 3–6
Loss	2.	Apr 1992	Seoul, South Korea	Hard	(Japan) Shuzo Matsuoka	3–6, 6–4, 5–7
Loss	3.	Apr 1993	Seoul, South Korea	Hard	(United States) Chuck Adams	4–6, 4–6
Loss	4.	Jul 1994	Newport, US	Grass	(United States) David Wheaton	4–6, 6–3, 6–7^{(5–7)}
Win	1.	May 1995	Coral Springs, US	Clay	(United Kingdom) Greg Rusedski	6–4, 6–2
Loss	5.	Jun 1995	Nottingham, UK	Grass	(Argentina) Javier Frana	6–7^{(4–7)}, 3–6
Loss	6.	Aug 1996	Toronto, Canada	Hard	(South Africa) Wayne Ferreira	2–6, 4–6
Win	2.	Jan 1997	Adelaide, Australia	Hard	(Australia) Scott Draper	6–2, 6–1
Loss	7.	Feb 1997	Memphis, US	Hard (i)	(United States) Michael Chang	3–6, 4–6

=== Doubles: 114 (83–31) ===
Legend Grand Slam (16–4) Tennis Masters Cup (2–2) Olympic Gold (1–0) ATP Masters Series (18–8) ATP Championship Series (12–2) ATP Tour (34–15)	Titles by surface Hard (43–19) Clay (13–5) Grass (15–4) Carpet (12–3)

Result	No.	Date	Tournament	Surface	Partner	Opponents	Score
Loss	1.	18 April 1988	Madrid, Spain	Clay	(Australia) Jason Stoltenberg	(Spain) Sergio Casal (Spain) Emilio Sánchez	7–6, 6–7, 3–6
Win	1.	12 March 1990	Casablanca, Morocco	Clay	(Australia) Simon Youl	(Netherlands) Paul Haarhuis (Netherlands) Mark Koevermans	6–3, 6–1
Loss	2.	23 April 1990	Seoul, South Korea	Hard	(Australia) Jason Stoltenberg	(Canada) Grant Connell (Canada) Glenn Michibata	6–7, 4–6
Loss	3.	7 May 1990	Singapore	Hard	(Australia) Brad Drewett	(Australia) Mark Kratzmann (Australia) Jason Stoltenberg	1–6, 0–6
Win	2.	1 October 1990	Brisbane, Australia (1)	Hard	(Australia) Jason Stoltenberg	(United States) Brian Garrow (Australia) Mark Woodforde	2–6, 6–4, 6–4
Win	3.	18 February 1991	Brussels, Belgium	Carpet	(Australia) Mark Woodforde	(Belgium) Libor Pimek (Netherlands) Michiel Schapers	6–3, 6–0
Win	4.	11 March 1991	Copenhagen, Denmark	Carpet	(Australia) Mark Woodforde	(Iran) Mansour Bahrami (Soviet Union) Andrei Olhovskiy	6–3, 6–1
Win	5.	15 April 1991	Tokyo, Japan (1)	Hard	(Sweden) Stefan Edberg	(Australia) John Fitzgerald (Sweden) Anders Järryd	6–4, 5–7, 6–4
Win	6.	17 June 1991	Queen's Club, UK (1)	Grass	(Australia) Mark Woodforde	(Canada) Grant Connell (Canada) Glenn Michibata	6–4, 7–6
Win	7.	26 August 1991	Schenectady, US	Hard	(Spain) Javier Sánchez	(Ecuador) Andrés Gómez (Spain) Emilio Sánchez	3–6, 7–6, 7–6
Win	8.	30 September 1991	Brisbane, Australia (2)	Hard	(Australia) Mark Woodforde	(Australia) John Fitzgerald (Canada) Glenn Michibata	7–6, 6–3
Win	9.	27 January 1992	Australian Open, Melbourne (1)	Hard	(Australia) Mark Woodforde	(United States) Kelly Jones (United States) Rick Leach	6–4, 6–3, 6–4
Win	10.	17 February 1992	Memphis, US (1)	Hard (i)	(Australia) Mark Woodforde	(United States) Kevin Curren (South Africa) Gary Muller	7–5, 4–6, 7–6
Win	11.	24 February 1992	Philadelphia, US (1)	Carpet	(Australia) Mark Woodforde	(United States) Jim Grabb (United States) Richey Reneberg	6–4, 7–6
Win	12.	6 April 1992	Singapore (1)	Hard	(Australia) Mark Woodforde	(Canada) Grant Connell (Canada) Glenn Michibata	6–7, 6–2, 6–4
Win	13.	17 August 1992	Cincinnati, US (1)	Hard	(Australia) Mark Woodforde	(United States) Patrick McEnroe (United States) Jonathan Stark	6–3, 1–6, 6–3
Win	14.	19 October 1992	Tokyo Indoor, Japan	Hard (i)	(Australia) Mark Woodforde	(United States) Jim Grabb (United States) Richey Reneberg	7–6, 6–4
Win	15.	2 November 1992	Stockholm, Sweden (1)	Carpet	(Australia) Mark Woodforde	(United States) Steve DeVries (Australia) David Macpherson	6–3, 6–4
Win	16.	29 November 1992	Tennis Masters Cup, Johannesburg (1)	Hard	(Australia) Mark Woodforde	(Australia) John Fitzgerald (Sweden) Anders Järryd	6–2, 7–6^{(7–4)}, 5–7, 3–6, 6–3
Win	17.	11 January 1993	Adelaide, Australia (1)	Hard	(Australia) Mark Woodforde	(Australia) John Fitzgerald (Australia) Laurie Warder	6–4, 7–5
Win	18.	15 February 1993	Memphis, US (2)	Hard (i)	(Australia) Mark Woodforde	(Netherlands) Jacco Eltingh (Netherlands) Paul Haarhuis	7–5, 6–2
Win	19.	19 April 1993	Hong Kong	Hard	(United States) David Wheaton	(Australia) Sandon Stolle (Australia) Jason Stoltenberg	6–1, 6–3
Win	20.	14 June 1993	Queen's Club, UK ()	Grass	(Australia) Mark Woodforde	(United Kingdom) Neil Broad (South Africa) Gary Muller	6–7, 6–3, 6–4
Win	21.	5 July 1993	Wimbledon, London (1)	Grass	(Australia) Mark Woodforde	(Canada) Grant Connell (United States) Patrick Galbraith	7–5, 6–3, 7–6^{(7–4)}
Win	22.	1 November 1993	Stockholm, Sweden (2)	Carpet	(Australia) Mark Woodforde	(South Africa) Gary Muller (South Africa) Danie Visser	6–1, 3–6, 6–2
Loss	4.	28 November 1993	Tennis Masters Cup, Johannesburg	Hard (i)	(Australia) Mark Woodforde	(Netherlands) Jacco Eltingh (Netherlands) Paul Haarhuis	6–7, 6–7, 4–6
Win	23.	7 February 1994	Dubai, UAE	Hard	(Australia) Mark Woodforde	(Australia) Darren Cahill (Australia) John Fitzgerald	6–7, 6–4, 6–2
Win	24.	9 May 1994	Pinehurst, US (1)	Clay	(Australia) Mark Woodforde	(United States) Jared Palmer (United States) Richey Reneberg	6–2, 3–6, 6–3
Loss	5.	13 June 1994	Queen's Club, UK	Grass	(Australia) Mark Woodforde	(Sweden) Jan Apell (Sweden) Jonas Björkman	6–3, 6–7, 4–6
Win	25.	4 July 1994	Wimbledon, London (2)	Grass	(Australia) Mark Woodforde	(Canada) Grant Connell (United States) Patrick Galbraith	7–6, 6–3, 6–1
Win	26.	22 August 1994	Indianapolis, US	Hard	(Australia) Mark Woodforde	(United States) Jim Grabb (United States) Richey Reneberg	6–3, 6–4
Loss	6.	12 September 1994	US Open, New York	Hard	(Australia) Mark Woodforde	(Netherlands) Jacco Eltingh (Netherlands) Paul Haarhuis	3–6, 6–7
Win	27.	31 October 1994	Stockholm, Sweden (3)	Carpet	(Australia) Mark Woodforde	(Sweden) Jan Apell (Sweden) Jonas Björkman	6–3, 6–4
Loss	7.	28 November 1994	Tennis Masters Cup, Jakarta	Hard (i)	(Australia) Mark Woodforde	(Sweden) Jan Apell (Sweden) Jonas Björkman	4–6, 6–4, 6–4, 6–7, 6–7
Win	28.	16 January 1995	Sydney, Australia (1)	Hard	(Australia) Mark Woodforde	(United States) Trevor Kronemann (Australia) David Macpherson	7–6, 6–4
Win	29.	27 March 1995	Miami, US (1)	Hard	(Australia) Mark Woodforde	(United States) Jim Grabb (United States) Patrick McEnroe	6–3, 7–6
Win	30.	15 May 1995	Pinehurst, US (2)	Clay	(Australia) Mark Woodforde	(United States) Alex O'Brien (Australia) Sandon Stolle	6–2, 6–4
Win	31	22 May 1995	Coral Springs, US (1)	Clay	(Australia) Mark Woodforde	(Spain) Sergio Casal (Spain) Emilio Sánchez	6–3, 6–1
Win	32.	10 July 1995	Wimbledon, London (3)	Grass	(Australia) Mark Woodforde	(United States) Rick Leach (United States) Scott Melville	7–5, 7–6, 7–6
Win	33.	14 August 1995	Cincinnati, US (2)	Hard	(Australia) Mark Woodforde	(The Bahamas) Mark Knowles (Canada) Daniel Nestor	6–2, 3–0, ret.
Win	34.	11 September 1995	US Open, New York (1)	Hard	(Australia) Mark Woodforde	(United States) Alex O'Brien (Australia) Sandon Stolle	6–3, 6–3
Loss	8.	23 October 1995	Vienna, Austria	Carpet	(Australia) Mark Woodforde	(South Africa) Ellis Ferreira (Netherlands) Jan Siemerink	4–6, 5–7
Win	35.	8 January 1996	Adelaide, Australia (2)	Hard	(Australia) Mark Woodforde	(Sweden) Jonas Björkman (United States) Tommy Ho	7–5, 7–6
Loss	9.	26 February 1996	Memphis, USA	Hard (i)	(Australia) Mark Woodforde	(The Bahamas) Mark Knowles (Canada) Daniel Nestor	4–6, 5–7
Win	36.	4 March 1996	Philadelphia, US (2)	Carpet	(Australia) Mark Woodforde	(Zimbabwe) Byron Black (Canada) Grant Connell	7–6, 6–2
Win	37.	18 March 1996	Indian Wells, US	Hard	(Australia) Mark Woodforde	(United States) Brian MacPhie (Australia) Michael Tebbutt	1–6, 6–2, 6–2
Win	38.	1 April 1996	Miami, US (2)	Hard	(Australia) Mark Woodforde	(South Africa) Ellis Ferreira (United States) Patrick Galbraith	6–1, 6–3
Win	39.	22 April 1996	Tokyo, Japan (2)	Hard	(Australia) Mark Woodforde	(The Bahamas) Mark Knowles (United States) Rick Leach	6–2, 6–3
Win	40.	20 May 1996	Coral Springs, US (2)	Clay	(Australia) Mark Woodforde	(United States) Ivan Baron (United States) Brett Hansen-Dent	6–3, 6–3
Win	41.	17 June 1996	Queen's Club, UK (3)	Grass	(Australia) Mark Woodforde	(Canada) Sébastien Lareau (United States) Alex O'Brien	6–3, 7–6
Win	42.	8 July 1996	Wimbledon, London (4)	Grass	(Australia) Mark Woodforde	(Zimbabwe) Byron Black (Canada) Grant Connell	4–6, 6–1, 6–3, 6–2
Win	43.	29 July 1996	Summer Olympics, US	Hard	(Australia) Mark Woodforde	(United Kingdom) Neil Broad (United Kingdom) Tim Henman	6–4, 6–4, 6–2
Win	44.	9 September 1996	US Open, New York (2)	Hard	(Australia) Mark Woodforde	(Netherlands) Jacco Eltingh (Netherlands) Paul Haarhuis	4–6, 7–6, 7–6
Win	45.	7 October 1996	Singapore (2)	Carpet	(Australia) Mark Woodforde	(Czech Republic) Martin Damm (Russia) Andrei Olhovskiy	7–6, 7–6
Win	46.	17 November 1996	Tennis Masters Cup, Hartford (2)	Carpet	(Australia) Mark Woodforde	(Canada) Sébastien Lareau (United States) Alex O'Brien	6–4, 5–7, 6–2, 7–6
Loss	10.	6 January 1997	Adelaide, Australia	Hard	(Australia) Mark Woodforde	(Australia) Patrick Rafter (United States) Bryan Shelton	4–6, 6–1, 3–6
Win	47.	27 January 1997	Australian Open, Melbourne (2)	Hard	(Australia) Mark Woodforde	(Canada) Sébastien Lareau (United States) Alex O'Brien	4–6, 7–5, 7–5, 6–3
Win	48.	31 March 1997	Miami, US (3)	Hard	(Australia) Mark Woodforde	(The Bahamas) Mark Knowles (Canada) Daniel Nestor	7–6, 7–6
Loss	11.	9 June 1997	French Open, Paris	Clay	(Australia) Mark Woodforde	(Russia) Yevgeny Kafelnikov (Czech Republic) Daniel Vacek	6–7, 6–4, 3–6
Win	49.	7 July 1997	Wimbledon, London (5)	Grass	(Australia) Mark Woodforde	(Netherlands) Jacco Eltingh (Netherlands) Paul Haarhuis	7–6, 7–6, 5–7, 6–3
Win	50.	11 August 1997	Cincinnati, US (3)	Hard	(Australia) Mark Woodforde	(Australia) Mark Philippoussis (Australia) Patrick Rafter	7–6, 4–6, 6–4
Win	51.	27 October 1997	Stuttgart, Germany (4)	Carpet	(Australia) Mark Woodforde	(United States) Rick Leach (United States) Jonathan Stark	6–3, 6–3
Win	52.	19 January 1998	Sydney, Australia (2)	Hard	(Australia) Mark Woodforde	(Netherlands) Jacco Eltingh (Canada) Daniel Nestor	6–3, 7–5
Loss	12.	2 February 1998	Australian Open, Melbourne	Hard	(Australia) Mark Woodforde	(Sweden) Jonas Björkman (Netherlands) Jacco Eltingh	2–6, 7–5, 6–2, 4–6, 3–6
Win	53.	16 February 1998	San Jose, US (1)	Hard (i)	(Australia) Mark Woodforde	(Brazil) Nelson Aerts (Brazil) André Sá	6–1, 7–5
Win	54.	23 February 1998	Memphis, US (3)	Hard (i)	(Australia) Mark Woodforde	(South Africa) Ellis Ferreira (Mexico) David Roditi	6–3, 6–4
Loss	13.	27 April 1998	Monte Carlo, Monaco	Clay	(Australia) Mark Woodforde	(Netherlands) Jacco Eltingh (Netherlands) Paul Haarhuis	4–6, 2–6
Win	55.	4 May 1998	Munich, Germany	Clay	(Australia) Mark Woodforde	(Australia) Joshua Eagle (Australia) Andrew Florent	6–0, 6–3
Loss	14.	6 July 1998	Wimbledon, London	Grass	(Australia) Mark Woodforde	(Netherlands) Jacco Eltingh (Netherlands) Paul Haarhuis	6–2, 4–6, 6–7, 7–5, 8–10
Loss	15.	12 October 1998	Shanghai, China	Carpet	(Australia) Mark Woodforde	(India) Mahesh Bhupathi (India) Leander Paes	4–6, 7–6, 6–7
Win	56.	19 October 1998	Singapore (3)	Carpet	(Australia) Mark Woodforde	(India) Mahesh Bhupathi (India) Leander Paes	6–2, 6–3
Win	57.	15 February 1999	San Jose, US (2)	Hard (i)	(Australia) Mark Woodforde	(North Macedonia) Aleksandar Kitinov (Federal Republic of Yugoslavia) Nenad Zimonjić	7–5, 6–7, 6–4
Win	58.	22 February 1999	Memphis, US (4)	Hard (i)	(Australia) Mark Woodforde	(Canada) Sébastien Lareau (United States) Alex O'Brien	6–3, 6–4
Win	59.	26 April 1999	Orlando, US (3)	Clay	(United States) Jim Courier	(United States) Bob Bryan (United States) Mike Bryan	7–6, 6–4
Loss	16.	3 May 1999	Atlanta, US	Clay	(Australia) Mark Woodforde	(United States) Patrick Galbraith (United States) Justin Gimelstob	7–5, 6–7, 3–6
Loss	17.	14 June 1999	Queen's Club, UK	Grass	(Australia) Mark Woodforde	(Canada) Sébastien Lareau (United States) Alex O'Brien	3–6, 6–7
Loss	18.	16 August 1999	Cincinnati, USA	Hard	(Australia) Mark Woodforde	(Zimbabwe) Byron Black (Sweden) Jonas Björkman	3–6, 6–7
Loss	19.	11 October 1999	Shanghai, China	Hard	(Australia) Mark Woodforde	(Canada) Sébastien Lareau (Canada) Daniel Nestor	5–7, 3–6
Loss	20.	18 October 1999	Singapore	Carpet	(Australia) Mark Woodforde	(Belarus) Max Mirnyi (Philippines) Eric Taino	3–6, 4–6
Win	60.	10 January 2000	Adelaide, Australia (3)	Hard	(Australia) Mark Woodforde	(Australia) Lleyton Hewitt (Australia) Sandon Stolle	6–4, 6–2
Win	61.	17 January 2000	Sydney, Australia (3)	Hard	(Australia) Mark Woodforde	(Australia) Lleyton Hewitt (Australia) Sandon Stolle	7–5, 6–4
Win	62.	3 April 2000	Miami, US (4)	Hard	(Australia) Mark Woodforde	(Czech Republic) Martin Damm (Slovakia) Dominik Hrbatý	6–3, 6–4
Win	63.	22 May 2000	Hamburg, Germany (1)	Clay	(Australia) Mark Woodforde	(Australia) Wayne Arthurs (Australia) Sandon Stolle	6–7, 6–4, 6–3
Win	64.	12 June 2000	French Open, Paris	Clay	(Australia) Mark Woodforde	(Netherlands) Paul Haarhuis (Australia) Sandon Stolle	7–6, 6–4
Win	65.	19 June 2000	Queen's Club, UK (4)	Grass	(Australia) Mark Woodforde	(United States) Jonathan Stark (Philippines) Eric Taino	6–7, 6–3, 7–6
Win	66.	10 July 2000	Wimbledon, London (6)	Grass	(Australia) Mark Woodforde	(Netherlands) Paul Haarhuis (Australia) Sandon Stolle	6–3, 6–4, 6–1
Win	67.	14 August 2000	Cincinnati, US (4)	Hard	(Australia) Mark Woodforde	(South Africa) Ellis Ferreira (United States) Rick Leach	7–6, 6–4
Loss	21.	2 October 2000	Summer Olympics, Australia	Hard	(Australia) Mark Woodforde	(Canada) Sébastien Lareau (Canada) Daniel Nestor	7–5, 3–6, 4–6, 6–7
Loss	22.	8 January 2001	Adelaide, Australia	Hard	(Australia) Wayne Arthurs	(Australia) David Macpherson (South Africa) Grant Stafford	7–6, 4–6, 4–6
Loss	23.	15 January 2001	Sydney, Australia	Hard	(Sweden) Jonas Björkman	(Canada) Daniel Nestor (Australia) Sandon Stolle	6–2, 6–7, 6–7
Win	68.	29 January 2001	Australian Open, Melbourne (3)	Hard	(Sweden) Jonas Björkman	(Zimbabwe) Byron Black (Germany) David Prinosil	6–1, 5–7, 6–4, 6–4
Loss	24.	19 March 2001	Indian Wells, USA	Hard	(Sweden) Jonas Björkman	(South Africa) Wayne Ferreira (Russia) Yevgeny Kafelnikov	2–6, 5–7
Loss	25.	2 April 2001	Miami, USA	Hard	(Sweden) Jonas Björkman	(Czech Republic) Jiří Novák (Czech Republic) David Rikl	5–7, 6–7
Win	69.	23 April 2001	Monte Carlo, Monaco (1)	Clay	(Sweden) Jonas Björkman	(Australia) Joshua Eagle (Australia) Andrew Florent	3–6, 6–4, 6–2
Win	70.	21 May 2001	Hamburg, Germany (2)	Clay	(Sweden) Jonas Björkman	(Canada) Daniel Nestor (Australia) Sandon Stolle	7–6, 3–6, 6–3
Loss	26.	29 October 2001	Stockholm, Sweden	Hard (i)	(Sweden) Jonas Björkman	(United States) Donald Johnson (United States) Jared Palmer	3–6, 6–4, 3–6
Win	71.	14 January 2002	Auckland, New Zealand	Hard	(Sweden) Jonas Björkman	(Argentina) Martín García (Czech Republic) Cyril Suk	7–6, 7–6
Win	72.	22 April 2002	Monte Carlo, Monaco (2)	Clay	(Sweden) Jonas Björkman	(Netherlands) Paul Haarhuis (Russia) Yevgeny Kafelnikov	6–3, 3–6, [10–7]
Loss	27.	20 May 2002	Hamburg, Germany	Clay	(Sweden) Jonas Björkman	(India) Mahesh Bhupathi (United States) Jan-Michael Gambill	2–6, 4–6
Loss	28.	17 June 2002	Halle, Germany	Grass	(Sweden) Jonas Björkman	(Germany) David Prinosil (Czech Republic) David Rikl	6–4, 6–7, 5–7
Win	73.	8 July 2002	Wimbledon, London (7)	Grass	(Sweden) Jonas Björkman	(The Bahamas) Mark Knowles (Canada) Daniel NestoR	6–1, 6–2, 6–7, 7–5
Win	74.	15 July 2002	Båstad, Sweden	Clay	(Sweden) Jonas Björkman	(Australia) Paul Hanley (Australia) Michael Hill	7–6, 6–4
Win	75.	16 June 2003	Halle, Germany	Grass	(Sweden) Jonas Björkman	(Czech Republic) Martin Damm (Czech Republic) Cyril Suk	6–3, 6–4
Win	76.	7 July 2003	Wimbledon, London (8)	Grass	(Sweden) Jonas Björkman	(India) Mahesh Bhupathi (Belarus) Max Mirnyi	3–6, 6–3, 7–6, 6–3
Loss	29.	11 August 2003	Montreal, Canada	Hard	(Sweden) Jonas Björkman	(India) Mahesh Bhupathi (Belarus) Max Mirnyi	3–6, 6–7
Win	77.	8 September 2003	US Open, New York (3)	Hard	(Sweden) Jonas Björkman	(United States) Bob Bryan (United States) Mike Bryan	5–7, 6–0, 7–5
Win	78.	27 October 2003	Stockholm, Sweden	Hard (i)	(Sweden) Jonas Björkman	(Australia) Wayne Arthurs (Australia) Paul Hanley	6–3, 6–4
Win	79.	19 January 2004	Sydney, Australia (4)	Hard	(Sweden) Jonas Björkman	(United States) Bob Bryan (United States) Mike Bryan	7–6, 7–5
Loss	30.	5 April 2004	Miami, USA	Hard	(Sweden) Jonas Björkman	(Zimbabwe) Wayne Black (Zimbabwe) Kevin Ullyett	2–6, 6–7
Win	80.	21 June 2004	Nottingham, England	Grass	(Australia) Paul Hanley	(United States) Rick Leach (United States) Brian MacPhie	6–4, 6–3
Win	81.	5 July 2004	Wimbledon, London (9)	Grass	(Sweden) Jonas Björkman	(Austria) Julian Knowle (Serbia and Montenegro) Nenad Zimonjić	6–1, 6–4, 4–6, 6–4
Loss	31.	9 August 2004	Cincinnati, USA	Hard	(Sweden) Jonas Björkman	(The Bahamas) Mark Knowles (Canada) Daniel Nestor	2–6, 6–3, 3–6
Win	82.	8 November 2004	Paris, France	Carpet	(Sweden) Jonas Björkman	(Zimbabwe) Wayne Black (Zimbabwe) Kevin Ullyett	6–3, 6–4
Win	83.	17 January 2005	Sydney, Australia (5)	Hard	(India) Mahesh Bhupathi	(France) Arnaud Clément (France) Michaël Llodra	6–3, 6–3

== Performance timelines ==
Key
W	F	SF	QF	#R	RR	Q#	P#	DNQ	A	Z#	PO	G	S	B	NMS	NTI	P	NH

(W) winner; (F) finalist; (SF) semifinalist; (QF) quarterfinalist; (#R) rounds 4, 3, 2, 1; (RR) round-robin stage; (Q#) qualification round; (P#) preliminary round; (DNQ) did not qualify; (A) absent; (Z#) Davis/Fed Cup Zonal Group (with number indication) or (PO) play-off; (G) gold, (S) silver or (B) bronze Olympic/Paralympic medal; (NMS) not a Masters tournament; (NTI) not a Tier I tournament; (P) postponed; (NH) not held; (SR) strike rate (events won / competed); (W–L) win–loss record.

=== Singles ===
Tournament	1988	1989	1990	1991	1992	1993	1994	1995	1996	1997	1998	1999	2000	2001	SR	W–L
Grand Slam tournaments
Australian Open	2R	2R	3R	4R	1R	3R	2R	1R	3R	3R	4R	1R	2R	1R	0 / 14	18–14
French Open	1R	A	2R	2R	3R	2R	A	2R	3R	2R	3R	1R	A	A	0 / 10	11–10
Wimbledon	1R	2R	1R	3R	2R	2R	A	3R	2R	SF	3R	2R	2R	2R	0 / 13	18–13
US Open	A	A	1R	3R	2R	2R	3R	3R	1R	2R	1R	A	A	A	0 / 9	9–9
Win–loss	1–3	2–2	3–4	8–4	4–4	5–4	3–2	5–4	5–4	9–4	7–4	1–3	2–2	1–2	0 / 46	56–46
ATP Masters Series
Indian Wells	Not MS Events Before 1990		A	A	1R	A	A	1R	2R	2R	1R	1R	A	A	0 / 6	2–6
Miami	Not MS Events Before 1990		A	A	A	A	1R	4R	3R	2R	A	1R	A	A	0 / 5	4–5
Monte Carlo	Not MS Events Before 1990		A	A	A	A	A	A	A	A	1R	A	A	A	0 / 1	0–1
Rome	Not MS Events Before 1990		A	1R	A	A	A	A	A	1R	A	A	A	A	0 / 2	0–2
Hamburg	Not MS Events Before 1990		A	A	A	A	A	A	A	A	A	A	A	A	0 / 0	0–0
Canada	Not MS Events Before 1990		A	A	A	2R	A	A	F	A	A	1R	A	A	0 / 3	6–3
Cincinnati	Not MS Events Before 1990		1R	1R	3R	A	2R	2R	1R	2R	1R	A	A	A	0 / 8	5–8
Stockholm / Essen / Stuttgart ^{1}	Not MS Events Before 1990		1R	2R	2R	A	1R	1R	2R	1R	A	A	A	A	0 / 7	3–7
Paris	Not MS Events Before 1990		A	1R	A	A	A	1R	1R	3R	2R	A	A	A	0 / 5	3–5
Win–loss	N/A		0–2	1–4	3–3	1–1	1–3	4–5	8–6	4–6	1–4	0–3	0–0	0–0	0 / 37	23–37
Year-end ranking	213	131	50	77	54	109	90	33	36	26	65	197	187	207		

^{1}This event was held in Stockholm through 1994, Essen in 1995, and Stuttgart from 1996 through 2001.

=== Doubles ===
Tournament	1988	1989	1990	1991	1992	1993	1994	1995	1996	1997	1998	1999	2000	2001	2002	2003	2004	2005	SR	W–L
Grand Slam tournaments
Australian Open	1R	1R	3R	SF	W	1R	QF	3R	1R	W	F	SF	SF	W	2R	QF	SF	QF	3 / 18	53–14
French Open	3R	A	QF	3R	3R	SF	QF	1R	SF	F	3R	1R	W	QF	QF	2R	3R	1R	1 / 17	42–16
Wimbledon	1R	LQ	QF	QF	SF	W	W	W	W	W	F	QF	W	3R	W	W	W	2R	9 / 17	73–8
US Open	1R	1R	2R	SF	SF	3R	F	W	W	1R	3R	QF	2R	3R	SF	W	3R	A	3 / 17	47–14
Win–loss	2–4	0–2	9–3	13–4	16–3	12–3	16–3	14–2	16–2	17–2	14–4	9–4	17–2	13–3	14–3	15–2	14–3	4–3	16 / 69	215–52
Year-end championships
Tennis Masters Cup	A	A	A	SF	W	F	F	SF	W	RR	RR	SF	A	A	NH	RR	SF	A	2 / 11	29–16
Summer Olympics
Summer Olympics	A	Not Held			2R	Not Held			W	Not Held			F	Not Held			2R	NH	1 / 4	10–3
ATP Masters Series
Indian Wells	Not MS Events Before 1990		A	A	QF	A	QF	SF	W	SF	2R	2R	QF	F	SF	SF	1R	1R	1 / 13	20–12
Miami	Not MS Events Before 1990		A	A	A	A	3R	W	W	W	2R	3R	W	F	2R	QF	F	QF	4 / 12	34–8
Monte Carlo	Not MS Events Before 1990		A	A	A	A	A	A	A	A	F	A	A	W	W	2R	QF	A	2 / 5	14–3
Rome	Not MS Events Before 1990		A	1R	1R	A	A	A	A	1R	1R	A	A	A	A	A	SF	SF	0 / 6	3–6
Hamburg	Not MS Events Before 1990		A	A	A	A	A	A	A	A	A	A	W	W	F	QF	SF	QF	2 / 6	17–4
Canada	Not MS Events Before 1990		A	A	A	A	1R	A	QF	A	A	1R	A	2R	A	F	A	A	0 / 5	5–5
Cincinnati	Not MS Events Before 1990		QF	1R	W	A	SF	W	QF	W	QF	F	W	SF	A	QF	F	A	4 / 13	33–9
Madrid (Stuttgart)	Not MS Events Before 1990		1R	1R	W	W	W	SF	QF	W	QF	SF	A	A	SF	QF	A	A	4 / 12	22–8
Paris	Not MS Events Before 1990		QF	QF	2R	QF	SF	SF	SF	2R	QF	QF	A	QF	SF	SF	W	A	1 / 14	21–13
Win–loss	N/A		4–3	1–4	9–3	5–1	9–5	13–3	14–4	15–3	6–7	8–6	17–1	22–5	15–5	12–8	15–6	4–4	18 / 86	169–68
Year-end ranking	89	181	25	7	2	3	5	1	1	1	5	8	2	2	5	5	6	39		
