= Tennis at the 1996 Summer Olympics =

- Date: 23 July–3 August 1996
- Edition: 12
- Surface: Hard (Plexipave)
- Location: Stone Mountain Tennis Center, Atlanta

Champions

Men's singles
- Andre Agassi; United States

Women's singles
- Lindsay Davenport; United States

Men's doubles
- Todd Woodbridge / Mark Woodforde; Australia

Women's doubles
- Gigi Fernández / Mary Joe Fernández; United States
← 1992 ·	Summer Olympics	· 2000 →

At the 1996 Summer Olympics in Atlanta, four tennis events (two for men and two for women) were contested. For the first time since the 1924 Olympics, a third place playoff was held to decide who would be awarded the bronze medal in each event.

== Medal summary ==
=== Events ===
Event	Gold	Silver	Bronze
Men's singles	Andre Agassi; United States	Sergi Bruguera; Spain	Leander Paes; India
Men's doubles	Australia; Todd Woodbridge; Mark Woodforde	Great Britain; Neil Broad; Tim Henman	Germany; Marc-Kevin Goellner; David Prinosil
Women's singles	Lindsay Davenport; United States	Arantxa Sánchez Vicario; Spain	Jana Novotná; Czech Republic
Women's doubles	United States; Gigi Fernández; Mary Joe Fernández	Czech Republic; Jana Novotná; Helena Suková	Spain; Conchita Martínez; Arantxa Sánchez Vicario

=== Medal table ===
Rank	Nation	Gold	Silver	Bronze	Total
1	United States	3	0	0	3
2	Australia	1	0	0	1
3	Spain	0	2	1	3
4	Czech Republic	0	1	1	2
5	Great Britain	0	1	0	1
6	Germany	0	0	1	1
6	India	0	0	1	1
Totals (7 entries)		4	4	4	12
