= Neil Broad =

South African-British tennis player

- Country (sports): South Africa (United Kingdom) Great Britain
- Residence: Cape Town, South Africa
- Born: 20 November 1966 (age 59) Cape Town, South Africa
- Height: 1.90 m (6 ft 3 in)
- Turned pro: 1986
- Retired: 2000
- Plays: Right-handed
- Prize money: $1,205,610

Singles
- Career record: 7–19
- Career titles: 0
- Highest ranking: No. 84 (8 May 1989)

Grand Slam singles results
- Australian Open: 2R (1989)
- French Open: 1R (1989)
- Wimbledon: 2R (1990)
- US Open: 2R (1989)

Doubles
- Career record: 283–273
- Career titles: 7
- Highest ranking: No. 9 (9 April 1990)

Grand Slam doubles results
- Australian Open: SF (1990)
- French Open: 2R (1989, 1992, 1995, 1997)
- Wimbledon: QF (1997)
- US Open: QF (1998)
Medal record
Representing Great Britain
Olympic Games
Silver medal – second place	1996 Atlanta	Doubles

Neil Broad (born 20 November 1966) is a former professional tennis player who represented Great Britain for most of his playing career. He is a former UK number 1 who won seven ATP tour doubles titles in his career, and won the silver medal in doubles at the 1996 Summer Olympics partnering Tim Henman.

== Playing career overview ==
The right-hander played primarily doubles in his career. He achieved his highest doubles ranking of No. 9 on 9 April 1990. Broad achieved his best Grand Slam doubles result at the 1990 Australian Open, reaching the semifinals while partnering Gary Muller of South Africa. Broad played on the Great Britain Davis Cup team from 1992 to 2000, achieving a doubles record of 4–7. He won a silver medal for Great Britain at the Atlanta Olympics in 1996, partnering Tim Henman. He retired from the tour in 2000.

Broad teamed up with Roger Federer in the doubles event at the Australian Open in 2000, they were defeated by David Macpherson and Peter Nyborg.

== Major finals ==
=== Olympic finals ===
==== Doubles: 1 (0–1) ====
Result	Year	Championship	Surface	Partner	Opponents	Score
Silver	1996	Atlanta	Hard	(United Kingdom) Tim Henman	(Australia) Todd Woodbridge (Australia) Mark Woodforde	4–6, 4–6, 2–6

== Career finals ==
=== Doubles (7 titles, 17 runners-up) ===
Legend
Grand Slam (0)
Tennis Masters Cup (0)
Olympic Games (0)
ATP Masters Series (0)
ATP Championship Series (0)
Grand Prix / ATP Tour (7)

Result	W-L	Date	Tournament	Surface	Partner	Opponents	Score
Win	1–0	Jan 1989	Adelaide, Australia	Hard	(South Africa) Stefan Kruger	(Australia) Mark Kratzmann (United States) Glenn Layendecker	6–2, 7–6
Loss	1–1	Jul 1989	Newport, U.S.	Grass	(South Africa) Stefan Kruger	(United States) Patrick Galbraith (United States) Brian Garrow	6–2, 5–7, 3–6
Win	2–1	Jul 1989	Washington, U.S.	Hard	(South Africa) Gary Muller	(United States) Jim Grabb (United States) Patrick McEnroe	6–7, 7–6, 6–4
Loss	2–2	Feb 1990	Toronto Indoor, Canada	Carpet (i)	(United States) Kevin Curren	(United States) Patrick Galbraith (Australia) David Macpherson	6–2, 4–6, 3–6
Loss	2–3	Aug 1990	Cincinnati, U.S.	Hard	(South Africa) Gary Muller	(Australia) Darren Cahill (Australia) Mark Kratzmann	6–7, 2–6
Loss	2–4	Sep 1990	Basel, Switzerland	Hard (i)	(South Africa) Gary Muller	(South Africa) Stefan Kruger (South Africa) Christo van Rensburg	6–4, 6–7, 3–6
Win	3–4	Oct 1990	Toulouse, France	Hard	(South Africa) Gary Muller	(Denmark) Michael Mortensen (Netherlands) Michiel Schapers	7–6, 6–4
Win	4–4	Feb 1992	Milan, Italy	Carpet (i)	(Australia) David Macpherson	(Spain) Sergio Casal (Spain) Emilio Sánchez	5–7, 7–5, 6–4
Loss	4–5	Oct 1992	Lyon, France	Carpet (i)	(South Africa) Stefan Kruger	(Switzerland) Jakob Hlasek (Switzerland) Marc Rosset	1–6, 3–6
Loss	4–6	Apr 1993	Seoul, South Korea	Hard	(South Africa) Gary Muller	(Sweden) Jan Apell (Sweden) Peter Nyborg	7–5, 6–7, 2–6
Loss	4–7	Jun 1993	London/Queen's Club, U.K.	Grass	(South Africa) Gary Muller	(Australia) Todd Woodbridge (Australia) Mark Woodforde	7–6, 3–6, 4–6
Loss	4–8	Jun 1994	Florence, Italy	Clay	(United States) Greg Van Emburgh	(Australia) Jon Ireland (United States) Kenny Thorne	6–7, 3–6
Win	5–8	Aug 1994	San Marino	Clay	(United States) Greg Van Emburgh	(Spain) Jordi Arrese (Italy) Renzo Furlan	6–4, 7–6
Loss	5–9	Oct 1994	Palermo, Italy	Clay	(United States) Greg Van Emburgh	(Netherlands) Tom Kempers (United States) Jack Waite	6–7, 4–6
Loss	5–10	Jul 1995	Amsterdam, Netherlands	Clay	(Australia) Wayne Arthurs	(Chile) Marcelo Ríos (Netherlands) Sjeng Schalken	6–7, 2–6
Loss	5–11	Apr 1996	Barcelona, Spain	Clay	(South Africa) Piet Norval	(Argentina) Luis Lobo (Spain) Javier Sánchez	1–6, 3–6
Loss	5–12	Jun 1996	Nottingham, U.K.	Grass	(South Africa) Piet Norval	(United Kingdom) Mark Petchey (United Kingdom) Danny Sapsford	7–6, 6–7, 4–6
Loss	5–13	Jul 1996	Atlanta Olympics, U.S.	Hard	(United Kingdom) Tim Henman	(Australia) Todd Woodbridge (Australia) Mark Woodforde	4–6, 4–6, 2–6
Loss	5–14	Oct 1996	Lyon, France	Carpet (i)	(South Africa) Piet Norval	(United States) Jim Grabb (United States) Richey Reneberg	2–6, 1–6
Loss	5–15	May 1997	Hamburg, Germany	Clay	(South Africa) Piet Norval	(Argentina) Luis Lobo (Spain) Javier Sánchez	3–6, 6–7
Loss	5–16	Mar 1998	Rotterdam, Netherlands	Carpet	(South Africa) Piet Norval	(Netherlands) Jacco Eltingh (Netherlands) Paul Haarhuis	6–7, 3–6
Win	6–16	Aug 1998	Umag, Croatia	Clay	(South Africa) Piet Norval	(Czech Republic) Jiří Novák (Czech Republic) David Rikl	6–1, 3–6, 6–3
Win	7–16	Sep 1998	Bournemouth, U.K.	Clay	(Zimbabwe) Kevin Ullyett	(Australia) Wayne Arthurs (Spain) Alberto Berasategui	7–6, 6–3
Loss	7–17	Feb 1999	Rotterdam, Netherlands	Carpet	(Australia) Peter Tramacchi	(South Africa) David Adams (South Africa) John-Laffnie de Jager	7–6, 3–6, 4–6

== After the tour ==
Since retirement, Broad has helped coach South African Paralympic tennis player Tim Hubbard in preparation for the 2004 Paralympic Games. Broad is currently coaching Brad Williams, a player at Texas A&M University. Broad also plays tennis on the Senior tour.
