= Stone Mountain Tennis Center =

Tennis venue in Stone Mountain, Georgia

Coordinates: 33.821095°N 84.123387°W

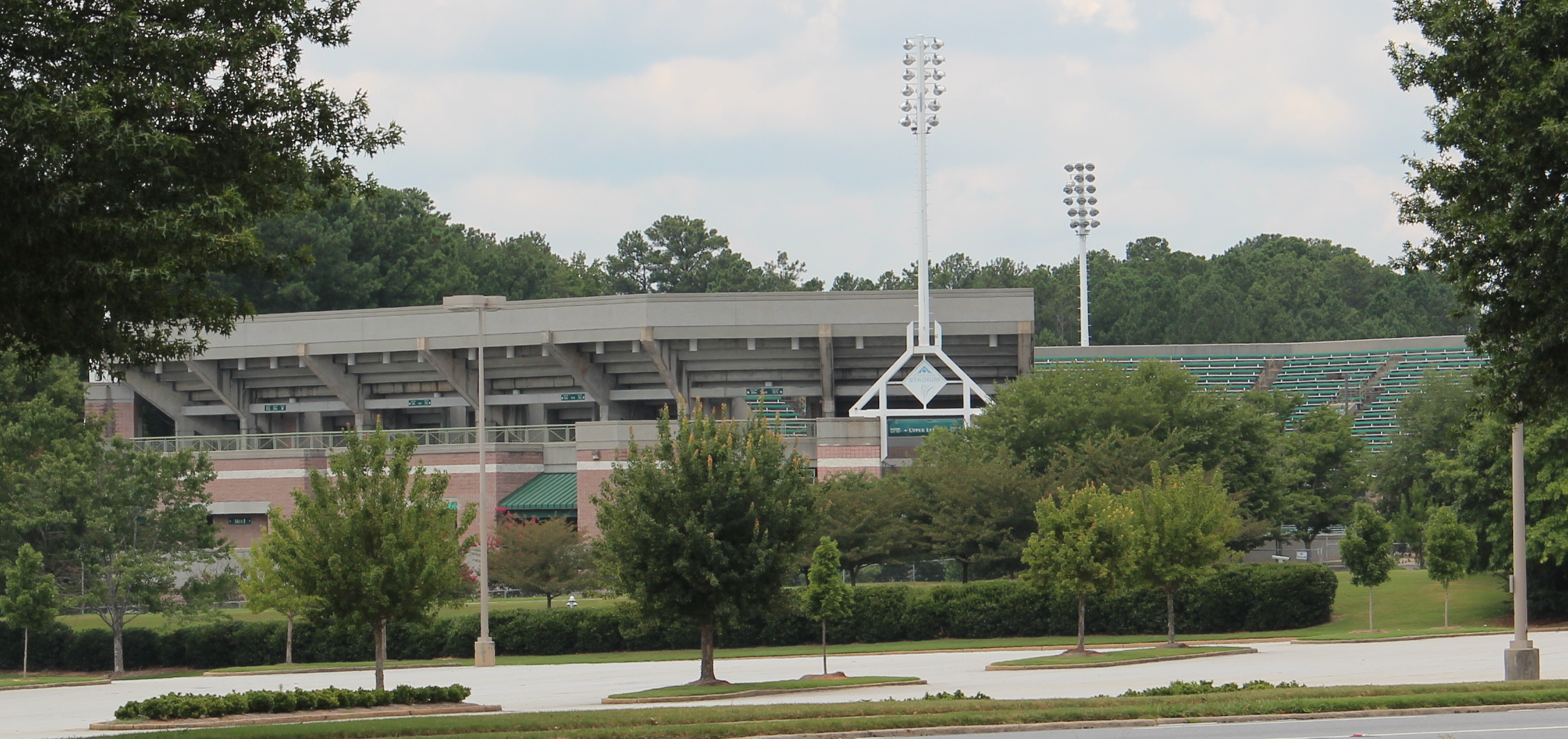
Stone Mountain Tennis Center in 2016

The Stone Mountain Tennis Center was a tennis venue at Stone Mountain Park in Stone Mountain, Georgia, USA.

It was built to host the tennis events for the 1996 Summer Olympics and the 1996 Summer Paralympics, at a total cost of $22 million. At the time of the Olympics, the complex included over 12,000 seats for tennis fans, a 50,000-square-foot (4,600 m^{2}) plaza area located around the stadium, and a stadium court plus 15 additional outer courts. The reconfigured stadium held 7,200 people, and two smaller courts seated 4,000 and 2,000. Although the park was in DeKalb County, the Tennis Center itself was in Gwinnett County.

The facility played host to the 1997 U.S. Women's Hard Court Championships and the 1998 Davis Cup competition featuring Andre Agassi and Jim Courier, which the U.S. won against Russia. The Stone Mountain Tennis Center also hosted a concert in October 2005 featuring Roberta Flack and Melba Moore.

Since the Olympics, the ownership of the facility has transferred to the State of Georgia's Stone Mountain Memorial Association and then to Gwinnett County in 2016. The facility fell into disrepair since it closed in 2007 and was demolished in 2018.

== See also ==
- List of tennis stadiums by capacity
