= 2007 Canoe Sprint European Championships =

International canoeing and kayaking event

The 2007 Canoe Sprint European Championships were held in Pontevedra, Spain.

== Medal overview ==
=== Men ===
Event	Gold	Time	Silver	Time	Bronze	Time
C1-200m	(Lithuania) Jevgenij Shuklin	41.969	(Russia) Maksim Opalev	42.092	(Ukraine) Yuriy Cheban	42.132
C2-200m	(Lithuania); Tomas Gadeikis; Raimundas Labuckas	38.389	(Russia); Evgeny Ignatov; Ivan Shtyl	38.690	(Germany); Tomasz Wylenzek; Christian Gille	38.973
C4-200m	(Russia); Nikolai Lipkin; Yevgeniy Dorokhin; Evgeny Ignatov; Ivan Shtyl	35.150	(Belarus); Kanstantsin Shcharbak; Dzmitry Rabchanka; Dzmitry Vaitsishkin; Aliaksandr Vauchetski	35.456	(Hungary); Márton Joób; Pál Sarudi; Gábor Horváth; Péter Balázs	35.889
K1-200m	(Germany) Jonas Ems	36.796	(Poland) Marek Twardowski	37.119	(Hungary) Gergely Gyertyános	37.432
K2-200m	(Belarus); Vadzim Makhneu; Raman Piatrushenka	33.664	(Germany); Tim Wieskötter; Ronald Rauhe	33.669	(Serbia); Ognjen Filipović; Dragan Zorić	33.915
K4-200m	(Serbia); Ognjen Filipović; Dragan Zorić; Bora Sibinkić; Milan Djenadić	31.088	(Belarus); Raman Piatrushenka; Aliaksei Abalmasau; Dziamyan Turchyn; Vadzim Makhneu	31.498	(Hungary); Viktor Kadler; Gergely Gyertyános; Balázs Babella; István Beé	31.708
C1-500m	(Germany) Andreas Dittmer	1:54.540	(Russia) Nikolai Lipkin	1:54.613	(Spain) David Cal Figueroa	1:55.733
C2-500m	(Belarus); Aliaksandr Bahdanovich; Andrei Bahdanovich	1:59.188	(Russia); Sergey Ulegin; Alexander Kostoglod	1:59.818	(Hungary); György Kozmann; György Kolonics	2:00.454
C4-500m	(Belarus); Aliaksandr Bahdanovich; Andrei Bahdanovich; Aliaksandr Zhukouski; Aliaksandr Kurliandchyk	1:38.376	(Poland); Marcin Grzybowski; Łukasz Woszczyński; Arkadiusz Toński; Paweł Skowroński	1:39.286	(Germany); Thomas Lück; Stefan Holtz; Robert Nuck; Sebastian Brendel	1:39.359
K1-500m	(United Kingdom) Tim Brabants	1:42.653	(Sweden) Anders Gustafsson	1:42.905	(Poland) Marek Twardowski	1:43.450
K2-500m	(Germany); Tim Wieskötter; Ronald Rauhe	1:33.906	(Belarus); Vadzim Makhneu; Raman Piatrushenka	1:34.436	(Poland); Adam Wysocki; Tomasz Mendelski	1:36.235
K4-500m	(Slovakia); Juraj Tarr; Richard Riszdorfer; Michal Riszdorfer; Erik Vlček	1:25.210	(Belarus); Ruslan Bichan; Dzianis Zhyhadla; Siarhei Findziukevich; Stanislau Strelchanka	1:26.729	(Hungary); Attila Csamango; Gábor Bozsik; Attila Boros; Márton Sík	1:26.829
C1-1000m	(Hungary) Attila Vajda	4:04.429	(Russia) Maksim Opalev	4:07.712	(Spain) David Cal Figueroa	4:08.676
C2-1000m	(Germany); Christian Gille; Tomasz Wylenzek	3:48.304	(Hungary); György Kozmann; György Kolonics	3:48.574	(Belarus); Andrei Bahdanovich; Aliaksandr Bahdanovich	3:50.087
C4-1000m	(Belarus); Aliaksandr Vauchetski; Dzmitry Rabchanka; Dzmitry Vaitsishkin; Kanstantsin Shcharbak	3:30.666	(Hungary); Márton Metka; Róbert Mike; Gábor Balázs; Mátyás Sáfrán	3:31.229	(Romania); Nicolae Flocea; Silviu Simioncencu; Andrei Cuculici; Josif Chirilă	3:34.439
K1-1000m	(Norway) Eirik Verås Larsen	3:39.179	(United Kingdom) Tim Brabants	3:40.342	(Hungary) Zoltán Benkő	3:41.742
K2-1000m	(Hungary); Gábor Kucsera; Zoltán Kammerer	3:21.174	(Germany); Rupert Wagner; Andreas Ihle	3:21.867	(France); Cyrille Carré; Philippe Colin	3:21.957
K4-1000m	(Slovakia); Richard Riszdorfer; Michal Riszdorfer; Erik Vlček; Juraj Tarr	3:02.812	(Hungary); Ákos Vereckei; Roland Kökény; Gábor Horváth; Lajos Gyökös	3:03.372	(Poland); Marek Twardowski; Adam Seroczyński; Tomasz Mendelski; Adam Wysocki	3:03.812

=== Women ===
Event	Gold	Time	Silver	Time	Bronze	Time
K1-200m	(Hungary) Nataša Janić	42.459	(Finland) Anne Rikala	43.448	(Ukraine) Inna Osypenko-Radomska	43.468
K2-200m	(Germany); Nicole Reinhardt; Fanny Fischer	39.170	(Slovakia); Martina Kohlová; Ivana Kmetová	39.356	(Hungary); Melinda Patyi; Tímea Paksy	39.896
K4-200m	(Germany); Katrin Wagner-Augustin; Maren Knebel; Conny Waßmuth; Carolin Leonhardt	37.202	(Hungary); Katalin Kovács; Tímea Paksy; Melinda Patyi; Krisztina Fazekas	37.312	(Sweden); Josefin Nordlöw; Sofia Paldanius; Karin Johansson; Anna Karlsson	37.892
K1-500m	(Germany) Katrin Wagner-Augustin	1:53.985	(Hungary) Katalin Kovács	1:54.598	(Finland) Anne Rikala	1:55.218
K2-500m	(Hungary); Tímea Paksy; Dalma Benedek	1:46.714	(Germany); Fanny Fischer; Nicole Reinhardt	1:47.191	(Poland); Monika Borowicz; Dorota Kuczkowska	1:47.984
K4-500m	(Germany); Carolin Leonhardt; Katrin Wagner-Augustin; Maren Knebel; Conny Waßmuth	1:38.553	(Hungary); Tímea Paksy; Katalin Kovács; Krisztina Fazekas; Melinda Patyi	1:40.027	(Poland); Sandra Pawelczak; Aneta Konieczna; Małgorzata Chojnacka; Ewelina Wojnarowska	1:40.305
K1-1000m	(Sweden) Sofia Paldanius	4:08.410	(Hungary) Katalin Kovács	4:09.490	(Germany) Friedericke Leue	4:09.530
K2-1000m	(Hungary); Danuta Kozák; Gabriella Szabó	3:51.404	(Poland); Małgorzata Chojnacka; Ewelina Wojnarowska	3:51.444	(Sweden); Emma Andersson; Annika Andersson	3:54.970
K4-1000m	(Hungary); Dalma Benedek; Alexandra Keresztesi; Krisztina Fazekas; Tímea Paksy	3:27.060	(Germany); Friedericke Leue; Marina Schuck; Judith Hörmann; Gesine Ruge	3:29.613	(Italy); Alice Fagioli; Alessandra Galiotto; Fabiana Sgroi; Stefania Cicali	3:29.726

=== Medal table ===
Rank	Nation	Gold	Silver	Bronze	Total
1	Germany	8	4	3	15
2	Hungary	6	7	7	20
3	Belarus	4	4	1	9
4	Slovakia	2	1	0	3
5	Lithuania	2	0	0	2
6	Russia	1	5	0	6
7	Sweden	1	1	2	4
8	Great Britain	1	1	0	2
9	Serbia	1	0	1	2
10	Norway	1	0	0	1
11	Poland	0	3	5	8
12	Finland	0	1	1	2
13	Spain	0	0	2	2
13	Ukraine	0	0	2	2
15	France	0	0	1	1
15	Italy	0	0	1	1
15	Romania	0	0	1	1
Totals (17 entries)		27	27	27	81
