= 2008 Canoe Sprint European Championships =

International canoeing and kayaking event

The 2008 Canoe Sprint European Championships were held in Milan, Italy.

== Medal overview ==
=== Men ===
Event	Gold	Time	Silver	Time	Bronze	Time
C1-200m	(Russia) Nikolai Lipkin	40.204	(Belarus) Dzmitry Vaitsishkin	41.627	(Hungary) László Foltán Jr.	41.707
C2-200m	(Lithuania); Tomas Gadeikis; Raimundas Labuckas	37.167	(Russia); Evgeny Ignatov; Ivan Shtyl	37.177	(Hungary); Attila Végh; Gergely Kovács	38.577
C4-200m	(Russia); Ivan Shtyl; Evgeny Ignatov; Nikolai Lipkin; Viktor Melantyev	34.613	(Hungary); Péter Balázs; Gábor Horváth; Márton Joób; Pál Sarudi	34.979	(Belarus); Aliaksandr Bahdanovich; Dzmitry Rabchanka; Andrei Bahdanovich; Aliaksandr Zhukouski	35.096
K1-200m	(Lithuania) Vytautas Vaičikonis	36.333	(Hungary) Péter Molnár	36.506	(Latvia) Aleksejs Rumjancevs	36.536
K2-200m	(Belarus); Vadzim Makhneu; Raman Piatrushenka	32.920	(Lithuania); Egidijus Balčiūnas; Alvydas Duonėla	33.374	(Hungary); Péter Molnár; Viktor Kadler	33.454
K4-200m	(Belarus); Raman Piatrushenka; Dziamyan Turchyn; Vadzim Makhneu; Ruslan Bichan	30.721	(Serbia); Ognjen Filipović; Bora Sibinkić; Milan Djenadić; Dragan Zorić	30.784	(Hungary); Márton Sík; Gergely Boros; Attila Csamango; Balázs Babella	31.094
C1-500m	(Russia) Nikolai Lipkin	1:56.156	(Germany) Sebastian Brendel	1:56.435	(Ukraine) Yuriy Cheban	1:57.569
C2-500m	(Russia); Sergey Ulegin; Alexander Kostoglod	1:48.271	(Hungary); György Kolonics; György Kozmann	1:48.918	(Bulgaria); Deyan Georgiev; Adnan Aliev	1:49.028
C4-500m	(Romania); Cătălin Costache; Constantin Popa; Silviu Simioncencu; Nicolae Flocea	1:39.237	(Hungary); Gábor Horváth; Péter Balázs; Pál Sarudi; Márton Joób	1:40.547	(Russia); Mikhail Pavlov; Roman Kruglyakov; Alexander Kovalev; Dmitri Sergeev	1:40.857
K1-500m	(Denmark) Kasper Bleibach	1:44.598	(Italy) Michele Zerial	1:44.638	(Russia) Anton Ryahov	1:45.275
K2-500m	(Germany); Tim Wieskötter; Ronald Rauhe	1:33.432	(Spain); Saúl Craviotto Rivero; Carlos Pérez Rial	1:33.925	(Lithuania); Egidijus Balčiūnas; Alvydas Duonėla	1:35.222
K4-500m	(Slovakia); Erik Vlček; Michal Riszdorfer; Richard Riszdorfer; Juraj Tarr	1:20.655	(Hungary); Zoltán Benkő; Gábor Kucsera; Viktor Kadler; Zoltán Kammerer	1:21.822	(Belarus); Vadzim Makhneu; Artur Litvinchuk; Aliaksei Abalmasau; Raman Piatrushenka	1:21.822
C1-1000m	(France) Mathieu Goubel	3:58.869	(Russia) Konstantin Fomichev	3:59.723	(Germany) Sebastian Brendel	4:00.989
C2-1000m	(Belarus); Andrei Bahdanovich; Aliaksandr Bahdanovich	3:40.655	(Ukraine); Sergey Bezugliy; Maksym Prokopenko	3:41.192	(Poland); Paweł Baraszkiewicz; Wojciech Tyszynski	3:41.955
C4-1000m	(Belarus); Dzmitry Rabchanka; Dzmitry Vaitsishkin; Kanstantsin Shcharbak; Aliaksandr Vauchetski	3:23.386	(Romania); Cătălin Costache; Florin Mironcic; Andrei Cuculici; Josif Chirilă	3:24.559	(Poland); Arkadiusz Toński; Adam Ginter; Łukasz Gros; Łukasz Woszczyński	3:25.116
K1-1000m	(United Kingdom) Tim Brabants	3:33.493	(Hungary) Gábor Kucsera	3:33.563	(Germany) Max Hoff	3:34.960
K2-1000m	(Denmark); René Poulsen; Kim Wråe Knudsen	3:16.003	(Spain); Javier Hernanz; Diego Cosgaya	3:16.336	(France); Philippe Colin; Cyrille Carré	3:17.616
K4-1000m	(Slovakia); Erik Vlček; Juraj Tarr; Michal Riszdorfer; Richard Riszdorfer	3:02.876	(Germany); Torsten Eckbrett; Lutz Altepost; Norman Bröckl; Björn Goldschmidt	3:04.284	(Italy); Antonio Rossi; Franco Benedini; Luca Piemonte; Alberto Ricchetti	3:04.532

=== Women ===
Event	Gold	Time	Silver	Time	Bronze	Time
K1-200m	(United Kingdom) Lucy Wainwright	41.399	(Ukraine) Inna Osypenko-Radomska	41.607	(Poland) Dorota Kuczkowska	42.471
K2-200m	(Slovakia); Martina Kohlová; Ivana Kmetová	38.198	(Poland); Sandra Pawelczak; Marta Walczykiewicz	39.158	(Hungary); Melinda Patyi; Krisztina Fazekas	39.183
K4-200m	(Hungary); Melinda Patyi; Krisztina Fazekas; Danuta Kozák; Tímea Paksy	35.915	(Russia); Nadezda Petrova; Nadezda Pishulina; Natalia Lobova; Alexandra Tomnikova	36.559	(Serbia); Miljana Knezevic; Antonija Panda; Marta Tibor; Renata Kubik	36.592
K1-500m	(Hungary) Katalin Kovács	1:56.195	(Germany) Katrin Wagner-Augustin	1:56.475	(Italy) Josefa Idem	1:57.035
K2-500m	(Hungary); Danuta Kozák; Gabriella Szabó	1:48.459	(Finland); Jenni Mikkonen; Anne Rikala	1:49.426	(Germany); Fanny Fischer; Nicole Reinhardt	1:49.502
K4-500m	(Germany); Conny Waßmuth; Carolin Leonhardt; Katrin Wagner-Augustin; Nicole Reinhardt	1:32.953	(Hungary); Danuta Kozák; Tímea Paksy; Krisztina Fazekas; Dalma Benedek	1:33.547	(Spain); Beatriz Manchón; Jana Smidakova; Teresa Portela Rivas; Sonia Molanes Costa	1:34.813
K1-1000m	(Hungary) Dalma Benedek	3:59.304	(Serbia) Antonija Nađ	4:03.961	(Germany) Marina Schuck	4:04.134
K2-1000m	(Hungary); Erika Medveczky; Berenike Faldum	3:44.105	(Poland); Marta Walczykiewicz; Sandra Pawelczak	3:47.095	(Romania); Lidia Talpă; Alina Chirilă	3:49.932
K4-1000m	(Hungary); Dalma Benedek; Krisztina Fazekas; Alexandra Keresztesi; Tímea Paksy	3:28.303	(Poland); Beata Mikołajczyk; Edyta Dzieniszewska; Małgorzata Chojnacka; Ewelina Wojnarowska	3:30.613	(Romania); Alina Chirilă; Lidia Talpă; Florica Vulpeş; Iulia Pascu	3:36.400

=== Medal table ===
Rank	Nation	Gold	Silver	Bronze	Total
1	Hungary	6	7	5	18
2	Russia	4	3	2	9
3	Belarus	4	1	2	7
4	Slovakia	3	0	0	3
5	Germany	2	3	4	9
6	Lithuania	2	1	1	4
7	Denmark	2	0	0	2
7	Great Britain	2	0	0	2
9	Romania	1	1	2	4
10	France	1	0	1	2
11	Poland	0	3	3	6
12	Serbia	0	2	1	3
12	Spain	0	2	1	3
12	Ukraine	0	2	1	3
15	Italy	0	1	2	3
16	Finland	0	1	0	1
17	Bulgaria	0	0	1	1
17	Latvia	0	0	1	1
Totals (18 entries)		27	27	27	81
