= Milan Đenadić =

Serbian canoeist

Medal record

Men's canoe sprint

Representing Serbia

World Championships
Gold medal – first place	2006 Szeged	K-4 200 m
Silver medal – second place	2007 Duisburg	K-4 200 m

European Championships
Gold medal – first place	2007 Pontevedra	K-4 200 m
Silver medal – second place	2008 Milan	K-4 200 m

Milan Đenadić (Serbian Cyrillic: Милан Ђенадић) is a Serbian sprint canoer who won two medals in the K-4 200 m event at the ICF Canoe Sprint World Championships with a gold in 2006 and a silver in 2007

Djenadić comes from a family of kayakers and took up the sport at the age of nine. He was national K-2 200 m champion as an eighteen-year-old in 1997 (with partner Marko Petrović), The following year he became the father of twins. With a young family to support and no grants on offer for paddlers outside the national squad, Djenadić started working full-time at a petrol station in Šabac. He continued paddling at club level but in 2000 he decided he could no longer combine work and training. In 2003 however he took up canoeing again, at first on a semi-recreational basis but soon found he was training seriously again. In 2004 he came fourth in the K1 200m for his club KK Zorka-Boje at the Serbian club championships. In 2005 he was a member of the Zorka-Boje crew which won the K4 500m final. But it was his second place in the K1 200m which finally brought him to the national team selectors' notice.

2006 proved to be an extraordinary year for Djenadić. Now at last a member of the national squad, he was still working at the petrol station but was now eligible for a €2,000 training allowance. Djenadić and Bora Sibinkić were chosen to join up with reigning K-2 200 m world champions Ognjen Filipović and Dragan Zorić to form a new specialist K-4 200 m crew. Meanwhile, he made his first appearance for Serbia in international competition at the 2006 European Championships in Račice, Czech Republic, finishing in 11th place in the K1 200m.

As a club paddler Djenadić had always pushed himself hard in training and this foundation enabled him to adapt to the relentless training regime of world champions Filipović and Zorić, clocking up between 20 and 40 km per day. In July, in a trial race in Bačka Palanka, the new four defeated the number one crew of Šoti / Stanojević / Ilić / Našagaćin, who had reached the K4 200m final at Račice. This earned them the right to represent Serbia at the 2006 Flatwater Racing World Championships in Szeged, Hungary.

In Szeged, Djenadić and his new teammates won the gold medal at the first attempt, ahead of the host nation (and defending champions) Hungary. With two world champions on board confidence had been high but Djenadić seemed stunned at the finish, not quite able to believe they had won until he saw his teammates celebrating. Their winning time of 29.965 was the fastest ever in a world championship final.

A week later, after an unaccustomed round of press and TV interviews, he won two gold medals (K-4 200 m and K-4 500 m) and one silver (K-1 200 m) for his club, KK Zorka-Boje, at the 2006 Serbian national club championships.

The Szeged gold medal came with a share of the €120,000 prize money - a worthy reward for the long-time club paddler who then set his sights on the Beijing Olympics though he did not qualify.
