= Borowicz =

Borowicz (Polish pronunciation: [bɔˈrɔvitʂ]) is a Polish surname. Notable people include:

- Germano Borovicz Cardoso Schweger (born 1981), Brazilian footballer
- Katarzyna Borowicz (born 1985), Polish beauty queen
- Krystyna Borowicz (1923–2009), Polish actress
- Monika Borowicz (born 1982), Polish canoer
- Brandon J. Borowicz (born 1984), American archaeologist, entrepreneur, professional Magic the Gathering player
- Stephanie Borowicz (born c. 1977), American politician, member of the Pennsylvania House of Representatives
