= Cyrille Carré =

French canoeist

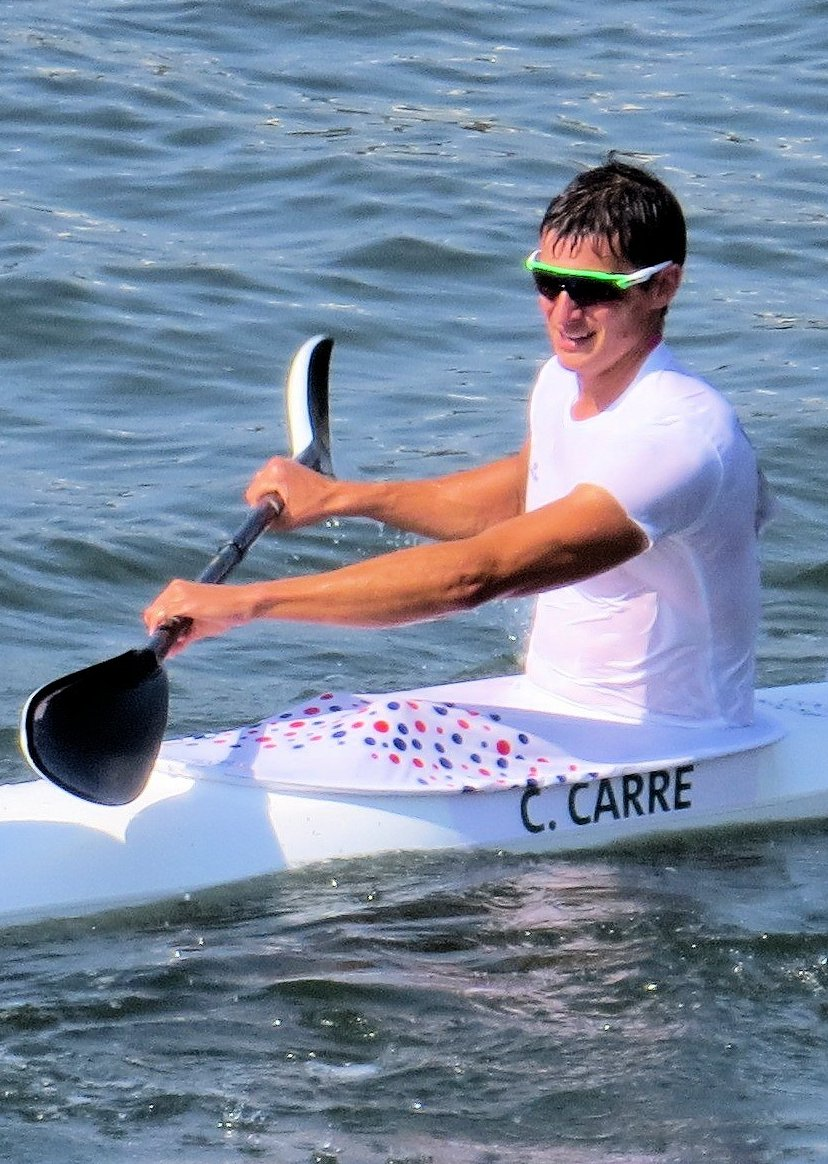
- Carré in 2016

Personal information
- Nationality: French
- Born: 11 May 1984 (age 42) Auxerre, France
- Height: 1.84 m (6 ft 0 in)
- Weight: 74 kg (163 lb)

Sport
- Country: France
- Sport: Sprint kayak
- Events: K-1 5000 m, K–2 1000 m
- Club: Olympic CK
Medal record
Representing France
Men's canoe sprint
World Championships
Gold medal – first place	2007 Duisburg	K-2 1000 m
Bronze medal – third place	2014 Moscow	K-1 5000 m
Bronze medal – third place	2019 Szeged	K-2 1000 m
European Games
Bronze medal – third place	2015 Baku	K-1 5000 m
European Championships
Bronze medal – third place	2007 Pontevedra	K-2 1000 m
Bronze medal – third place	2008 Milan	K-2 1000 m
Bronze medal – third place	2024 Szeged	K-2 1000 m
Men's canoe marathon
World Championships
Gold medal – first place	2019 Shaoxing	K-1 short race
Bronze medal – third place	2013 Copenhagen	K-1
Bronze medal – third place	2021 Pitești	K-2
European Championships
Gold medal – first place	2019 Decize	K-1 short race
Silver medal – second place	2021 Moscow	K-1
Bronze medal – third place	2009 Ostróda	K-1

Cyrille Carré (born 11 May 1984 in Auxerre) is a French sprint and marathon canoeist who has competed since the late 2000s.

== Career ==
Carré won a gold medal in the K-2 1000 m event at the 2007 ICF Canoe Sprint World Championships in Duisburg. He also finished sixth in the K-2 1000 m event at the 2008 Summer Olympics in Beijing (with Philippe Colin). At the 2012 Summer Olympics, he competed in the K-1 1000 m, finishing in 12th.
