= Sandra Pawelczak =

Polish canoeist

Medal record

Women's canoe sprint
Event	1st	2nd	3rd
Olympic Games	0	0	0
World Championships	0	0	1
European Championships	0	2	1
European Games	0	0	0
Total	0	2	2

World Championships
Bronze medal – third place	2010 Poznań	K-4 500 m

European Championships
Silver medal – second place	2008 Milan	K2-200m
Silver medal – second place	2008 Milan	K2-100 0m
Bronze medal – third place	2007 Pontevedra	K4-500 m

Sandra Pawelczak (born 16 July 1987) is a Polish sprint canoer who has competed since the late 2000s. She won a bronze medal in the K-4 500 m event at the 2010 ICF Canoe Sprint World Championships in Poznań.
