= Raimundas Labuckas =

Lithuanian canoeist (born 1984)

Medal record

Men's canoe sprint

World Championships
Gold medal – first place	2009 Dartmouth	C-2 200 m
Gold medal – first place	2010 Poznań	C-2 200 m
Gold medal – first place	2011 Szeged	C-2 200 m
Bronze medal – third place	2006 Szeged	C-2 200 m
Bronze medal – third place	2007 Duisburg	C-2 200 m

European Championships
Gold medal – first place	2007 Pontevedra	C-2 200 m
Gold medal – first place	2008 Milan	C-2 200 m
Gold medal – first place	2009 Brandenburg	C-2 200 m
Gold medal – first place	2010 Trasona	C-2 200 m
Gold medal – first place	2011 Belgrade	C-2 200 m
Gold medal – first place	2012 Zagreb	C-2 200 m
Silver medal – second place	2006 Račice	C-2 200 m
Bronze medal – third place	2006 Račice	C-4 200 m

Raimundas Labuckas (born February 9, 1984) is a Lithuanian former sprint canoeist who competed from 2005 to 2013. He won four medals in the C-2 200 m event at the ICF Canoe Sprint World Championships with two golds (2009, 2010) and two bronzes (2006, 2007).

Labuckas also competed in the C-2 500 m event at the 2008 Summer Olympics in Beijing, but was eliminated in the semifinals.

In 2013, Labuckas officially ended his career, stating that he was ready to use all his experience by being a coach.
