= 2007 ICF Canoe Sprint World Championships =

Canoe racing event in Duisburg, Germany

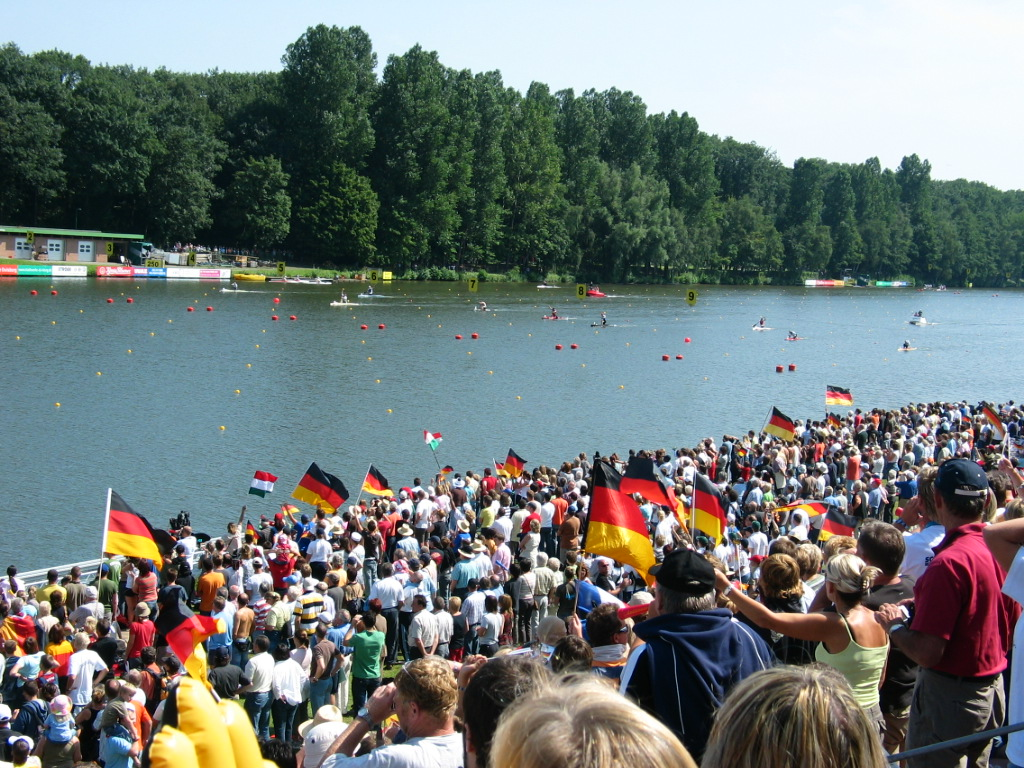
- C-1 event during the 2007 championships on 11 August
- Host city: Duisburg, Germany
- Dates: 9–12 August 2007

The 2007 ICF Canoe Sprint World Championships were held in Duisburg, Germany on 9–12 August 2007 for the record-tying fourth time. The German city had hosted the championships previously in 1979, 1987, and 1995. It tied Duisburg with Belgrade, Serbia (then Yugoslavia) who hosted in 1971, 1975, 1978, and 1982.

Men race as individuals, pairs and quads over 200 m, 500 m and 1000 m in both Canoe (Canadian) (C) and Kayak (K) events, giving a total of 18 gold medals. Women compete for only 9 gold medals as they race in kayak events only.

This was the 36th championships in canoe sprint.

== Highlights ==
Both German and Hungarian paddlers won 9 gold medals. With 6 silver Germany topped the medal table, while Hungarians finished first on the point table.

In the women's events the two nations shared all world titles. Since Natasa Janics left the legendary pair with Katalin Kovács all K-2 races were ruled by the German paddlers. However, Katalin Kovács won K-1 1000 m and 500 m, and gained two silvers in the K-4 events, while former partner Natasa Janics won the individual over 200 m. Hungarian team won the K-4 on 1000 m, and Germans the 500 m and 200 m.

In the men's races, the C-2 500 m final saw György Kolonics win his fifteenth and final championship title which is an outstanding record in the history of canoe sprint. Ronald Rauhe and Tim Wieskötter of Germany won their sixth K-2 500 m title in a row.

== Medal summary ==
=== Men's ===
Non-Olympic classes

==== Canoe ====
Event	Gold		Silver		Bronze	
C-1 200 m	Yuriy Cheban (UKR)	40.323	Maxim Opalev (RUS)	40.407	Evgeny Shuklin (LTU)	40.539
C-1 500 m	David Cal Figueroa (ESP)	1:47.187	Andreas Dittmer (GER)	1:47.383	Yang Wenjun (CHN)	1:47.545
C-1 1000 m	Attila Vajda (HUN)	4:08.563	Marián Ostrčil (SVK)	4:10.685	David Cal Figueroa (ESP)	4:11.057
C-2 200 m	Russia; Evgeny Ignatov; Ivan Shtyl	36.913	Germany; Christian Gille; Tomasz Wylenzek	37.192	Lithuania; Tomas Gadeikis; Raimundas Labuckas	37.407
C-2 500 m	Hungary; György Kozmann; György Kolonics	1:40.501	Romania; Iosif Chirilă; Andrei Cuculici	1:40.991	Germany; Christian Gille; Tomasz Wylenzek	1:41.501
C-2 1000 m	Germany; Christian Gille; Tomasz Wylenzek	3:46.627	Cuba; Serguey Torres; Karel Aguilar	3:47.591	Poland; Wojciech Tyszyński; Paweł Baraszkiewicz	3:48.103
C-4 200 m	Hungary; Péter Balázs; Gábor Horváth; Márton Joób; Pál Sarudi	34.297	Russia; Evgeny Dorokhin; Nikolay Lipkin; Evgeny Ignatov; Ivan Shtyl	34.365	Belarus; Dzmitry Rabchanka; Dzmitry Vaitsishkin; Kanstantsin Shcharbak; Aliaksandr Vauchetski	34.533
C-4 500 m	Hungary; Péter Balázs; Gábor Horváth; Márton Joób; Pál Sarudi	1:31.265	Germany; Robert Nuck; Sebastian Brendel; Thomas Lück; Stefan Holtz	1:31.497	Romania; Loredan Popa; Ciprian Popa; Nicolae Flocea; Florin Mironcic	1:31.879
C-4 1000 m	Romania; Andrei Cuculici; Loredan Popa; Silviu Simioncencu; Iosif Chirilă	3:23.325	Germany; Erik Leue; Stefan Holtz; Thomas Lück; Robert Nuck	3:24.619	Hungary; Márton Metka; Róbert Mike; Mátyás Sáfrán; Gábor Balázs	3:28.880

==== Kayak ====
Event	Gold		Silver		Bronze	
K-1 200 m	Jonas Ems (GER)	35.275	Vytautas Vaičikonis (LTU)	35.683	Gergely Gyertyános (HUN)	36.019
K-1 500 m	Adam van Koeverden (CAN)	1:36.279	Tim Brabants (GBR)	1:36.607	Marek Twardowski (POL)	1:36.661
K-1 1000 m	Tim Brabants (GBR)	3:40.113	Adam van Koeverden (CAN)	3:40.675	Eirik Verås Larsen (NOR)	3:41.64
K-2 200 m	Belarus; Raman Piatrushenka; Vadzim Makhneu	32.251	Germany; Ronald Rauhe; Tim Wieskötter	32.597	Serbia; Ognjen Filipović; Dragan Zorić	32.993
K-2 500 m	Germany; Ronald Rauhe; Tim Wieskötter	1:27.709	Belarus; Raman Piatrushenka; Vadzim Makhneu	1:27.873	Hungary; Zoltán Kammerer; Gábor Kucsera	1:29.527
K-2 1000 m	France; Philippe Colin; Cyrille Carré	3:24.683	Poland; Adam Seroczyński; Mariusz Kujawski	3:24.891	Hungary; Zoltán Kammerer; Gábor Kucsera	3:26.579
K-4 200 m	Hungary; Viktor Kadler; István Beé; Gergely Boros; Balázs Babella	30.715	Serbia; Ognjen Filipović; Dragan Zorić; Bora Sibinkić; Milan Đenadić	30.735	Russia; Stepan Shevchuk; Anton Vasilev; Konstantin Vishnyakov; Sergey Khovanskiy	30.913
K-4 500 m	Slovakia; Richard Riszdorfer; Michal Riszdorfer; Erik Vlček; Juraj Tarr	1:20.045	Belarus; Stanislau Strelchanka; Dzianis Zhyhadla; Siarhei Findziukevich; Ruslan Bichan	1:20.733	Hungary; Márton Sík; Attila Boros; Attila Csamangó; Gábor Bozsik	1:21.651
K-4 1000 m	Germany; Lutz Altepost; Norman Bröckl; Marco Herszel; Björn Goldschmidt	3:04.369	Poland; Marek Twardowski; Tomasz Mendelski; Paweł Baumann; Adam Wysocki	3:04.719	Slovakia; Richard Riszdorfer; Michal Riszdorfer; Erik Vlček; Juraj Tarr	3:05.625

=== Women's ===
Non-Olympic classes

==== Kayak ====
Event	Gold		Silver		Bronze	
K-1 200 m	Nataša Janić (HUN)	40.835	Anne Rikala (FIN)	41.069	Spela Ponomarenko (SLO)	41.243
K-1 500 m	Katalin Kovács (HUN)	1:48.663	Anne Rikala (FIN)	1:49.255	Katrin Wagner-Augustin (GER)	1:49.399
K-1 1000 m	Katalin Kovács (HUN)	4:06.823	Friedericke Leue (GER)	4:08.937	Sofia Paldanius (SWE)	4:10.901
K-2 200 m	Germany; Fanny Fischer; Nicole Reinhardt	37.339	Slovakia; Ivana Kmeťová; Martina Kohlová	37.921	Poland; Marta Walczykiewicz; Dorota Kuczkowska	38.697
K-2 500 m	Germany; Fanny Fischer; Nicole Reinhardt	1:40.275	Hungary; Tímea Paksy; Dalma Benedek	1:40.963	France; Anne Laure Viard; Marie Delattre	1:41.719
K-2 1000 m	Germany; Gesine Ruge; Judith Hörmann	3:45.933	Poland; Ewelina Wojnarowska; Małgorzata Chojnacka	3:47.142	Hungary; Danuta Kozák; Gabriella Szabó	3:49.174
K-4 200 m	Germany; Carolin Leonhardt; Conny Waßmuth; Katrin Wagner-Augustin; Maren Knebel	35.459	Hungary; Tímea Paksy; Katalin Kovács; Krisztina Fazekas; Melinda Patyi	37.921	Serbia; Miljana Knezevic; Antonija Panda; Renata Kubik; Marta Tibor	38.697
K-4 500 m	Germany; Carolin Leonhardt; Conny Waßmuth; Katrin Wagner-Augustin; Maren Knebel	1:37.145	Hungary; Tímea Paksy; Katalin Kovács; Krisztina Fazekas; Dalma Benedek	1.37.951	Poland; Monika Borowicz; Aneta Konieczna; Małgorzata Chojnacka; Ewelina Wojnarowska	1:38.103
K-4 1000 m	Hungary; Tímea Paksy; Krisztina Fazekas; Alexandra Keresztesi; Dalma Benedek	3:13.625	China; Wang Feng; Yang Yali; Yu Lamei; He Jing (canoeist)	3:13.971	Germany; Gesine Ruge; Friedericke Leue; Marina Schmuck; Judith Hörmann	3:15.025

== Medal table ==
Rank	Nation	Gold	Silver	Bronze	Total
1	Germany	9	6	3	18
2	Hungary	9	3	6	18
3	Belarus	1	2	1	4
3	Russia	1	2	1	4
3	Slovakia	1	2	1	4
6	Romania	1	1	1	3
7	Canada	1	1	0	2
7	Great Britain	1	1	0	2
9	France	1	0	1	2
9	Spain	1	0	1	2
11	Ukraine	1	0	0	1
12	Poland	0	3	4	7
13	Finland	0	2	0	2
14	Lithuania	0	1	2	3
14	Serbia	0	1	2	3
16	China	0	1	1	2
17	Cuba	0	1	0	1
18	Norway	0	0	1	1
18	Slovenia	0	0	1	1
18	Sweden	0	0	1	1
Totals (20 entries)		27	27	27	81
