= Petra Niemann =

German yacht racer (born 1978)

- Born: 14 August 1978 (age 47); East Berlin, East Germany
- Occupation: Yacht racer
- Height: 1.63 m (5 ft 4 in)

Petra Niemann (born 14 August 1978) is a German former yacht racer who competed in the 2000 Summer Olympics, in the 2004 Summer Olympics, and in the 2008 Summer Olympics.

Niemann posed nude in the German edition of Playboy in August 2008, alongside compatriots Nicole Reinhardt, Katharina Scholz and Romy Tarangul.
