= Gergely Boros =

Hungarian sprint canoer (1984–2026)

Personal information
- Born: 28 February 1984 Szekszárd, Hungary
- Died: 26 August 2026 (aged 42) Paks, Hungary
Medal record
Men's kayak sprint
World Championships
Gold medal – first place	2007 Duisburg	K-4 200 m
Silver medal – second place	2014 Moscow	K-2 500 m
European Championships
Gold medal – first place	2004 Poznań	K-4 200 m
Silver medal – second place	2005 Poznań	K-1 200 m
Bronze medal – third place	2008 Milan	K-4 200 m
Bronze medal – third place	2009 Brandenburg	K-4 200 m

Gergely Boros (28 February 1984 – 26 August 2026) was a Hungarian sprint kayaker who competed since the early 2000s. He won a gold medal in the K-4 200 m event at the 2007 ICF Canoe Sprint World Championships in Duisburg. Boros died in Paks, Hungary on 26 August 2026, at the age of 42.
