= Tomas Gadeikis =

Lithuanian canoeist (born 1984)

Medal record

Men's canoe sprint

World Championships
Gold medal – first place	2009 Dartmouth	C-2 200 m
Gold medal – first place	2010 Poznań	C-2 200 m
Gold medal – first place	2011 Szeged	C-2 200 m
Bronze medal – third place	2006 Szeged	C-2 200 m
Bronze medal – third place	2007 Duisburg	C-2 200 m

European Championships
Gold medal – first place	2007 Pontevedra	C-2 200 m
Gold medal – first place	2008 Milan	C-2 200 m
Gold medal – first place	2009 Brandenburg	C-2 200 m
Gold medal – first place	2010 Trasona	C-2 200 m
Gold medal – first place	2011 Belgrade	C-2 200 m
Gold medal – first place	2012 Zagreb	C-2 200 m
Silver medal – second place	2006 Račice	C-2 200 m
Bronze medal – third place	2006 Račice	C-4 200 m

Tomas Gadeikis (born January 30, 1984) is a retired Lithuanian sprint canoeist who competed from 2005 to 2014. He won four medals in the C-2 200 m event at the ICF Canoe Sprint World Championships with two golds (2009, 2010) and two bronzes (2006, 2007).

Gadeikis also competed in the C-2 500 m event at the 2008 Summer Olympics in Beijing, but was eliminated in the semifinals.

In 2014, Gadeikis announced his retirement from professional sport.
