= Ewelina Wojnarowska =

Polish canoeist (born 1986)

Medal record

Representing Poland
Event	1st	2nd	3rd
Olympic Games	0	0	0
World Championships	1	3	2
European Championships	1	3	4
European Games	0	0	2
Total	2	6	8

Women's canoe sprint

World Championships
Gold medal – first place	2014 Moscow	K-1 4x200 m
Silver medal – second place	2007 Duisburg	K-2 1000 m
Silver medal – second place	2010 Poznań	K-2 200 m
Silver medal – second place	2013 Duisburg	K–1 200 m Relay
Bronze medal – third place	2007 Duisburg	K-4 500 m
Bronze medal – third place	2011 Szeged	K-1 4 x 200 m

European Championships
Gold medal – first place	2015 Račice	K-1 500 m
Silver medal – second place	2007 Pontevedra	K2-1000 m
Silver medal – second place	2008 Milan	K-4 1000 m
Silver medal – second place	2014 Brandenburg	K-4 500 m
Bronze medal – third place	2007 Pontevedra	K4-500 m
Bronze medal – third place	2009 Brandenburg	K4-500 m
Bronze medal – third place	2010 Trasona	K-1 200 m
Bronze medal – third place	2011 Belgrade	K2-500 m

European Games
Bronze medal – third place	2015 Baku	K-1 500 m
Bronze medal – third place	2015 Baku	K-4 500 m

Ewelina Wojnarowska (Polish pronunciation: [ɛvɛˈlina vɔjnaˈrɔfska]; born 15 December 1986 in Poznań) is a Polish canoe sprinter who has competed since the late 2000s. She won three medals at the ICF Canoe Sprint World Championships with two silvers (K-2 200 m: 2010, K-2 1000 m: 2007) and a bronze (K-4 500 m: 2007). In June 2015, she competed in the inaugural European Games, for Poland in canoe sprint, more specifically, Women's K-1 500m and the Women's K-4 500m with Karolina Naja, Edyta Dzieniszewska, and Beata Mikołajczyk. She earned bronze medals in both events.
