= Dalma Ružičić-Benedek =

Hungarian-born Serbian canoeist

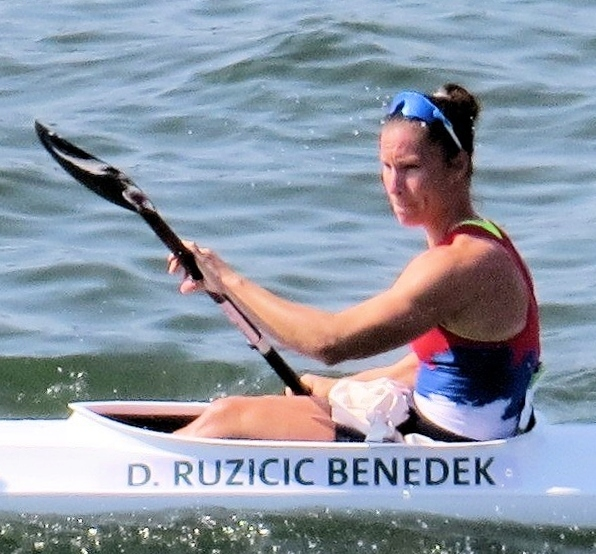
- Ružičić-Benedek at the 2016 Olympics

Personal information
- Born: 21 February 1982 (age 44) Budapest, Hungary
- Height: 165 cm (5 ft 5 in)
- Weight: 65 kg (143 lb)

Sport
- Sport: Canoe sprint
- Club: Mohak KK, Belgrade
Medal record
Representing Hungary
World Championships
Gold medal – first place	2003 Gainesville	K-2 1000 m
Gold medal – first place	2006 Szeged	K-1 500 m
Gold medal – first place	2006 Szeged	K-1 1000 m
Gold medal – first place	2007 Duisburg	K-4 1000 m
Gold medal – first place	2009 Dartmouth	K-4 500 m
Gold medal – first place	2010 Poznań	K-4 500 m
Gold medal – first place	2011 Szeged	K-4 500 m
Silver medal – second place	2005 Zagreb	K-1 1000 m
Silver medal – second place	2007 Duisburg	K-2 500 m
Silver medal – second place	2007 Duisburg	K-4 500 m
Bronze medal – third place	2005 Zagreb	K-4 500 m
Bronze medal – third place	2009 Dartmouth	K-2 1000 m
European Championships
Gold medal – first place	2004 Poznań	K-2 500 m
Gold medal – first place	2006 Račice	K-1 500 m
Gold medal – first place	2006 Račice	K-1 1000 m
Gold medal – first place	2007 Pontevedra	K-2 500 m
Gold medal – first place	2007 Pontevedra	K-4 1000 m
Gold medal – first place	2008 Milan	K-1 1000 m
Gold medal – first place	2008 Milan	K-4 1000 m
Silver medal – second place	2005 Poznań	K-4 200 m
Silver medal – second place	2008 Milan	K-4 500 m
Silver medal – second place	2009 Brandenburg	K-4 500 m
Silver medal – second place	2010 Trasona	K-4 500 m
Silver medal – second place	2011 Belgrade	K-4 500 m
Representing Serbia
World Championships
Silver medal – second place	2015 Milan	K-2 500 m
Bronze medal – third place	2014 Moscow	K-1 1000 m
European Championships
Gold medal – first place	2013 Montemor-o-Velho	K-1 500 m
Gold medal – first place	2013 Montemor-o-Velho	K-1 1000 m
Gold medal – first place	2016 Moscow	K-2 1000 m
Bronze medal – third place	2015 Račice	K-2 500 m
Bronze medal – third place	2015 Račice	K-2 1000 m
European Games
Gold medal – first place	2015 Baku	K-2 500m

Dalma Ružičić-Benedek (Serbian Cyrillic: Далма Ружичић-Бенедек, born 21 February 1982) is a Hungarian-born Serbian sprint canoer who has competed since 2003. She won twelve medals at the ICF Canoe Sprint World Championships with seven golds, three silvers and two bronzes.

== Career in Serbia ==
In late 2012, after failing to qualify for her third consecutive Olympic Games, Dalma Ružičić-Benedek decided to compete for Serbia, country of her husband, former canoer Dušan Ružičić who is also her personal coach. She made her debut for Serbia in the first stage of the 2013 World Cup in Szeged, when she won the gold medal in the K-1 500m. At the 2013 European Championship she won two gold medals at distances of 500m and 1000m. Ružičić-Benedek won her first World Championship medal for Serbia in 2014, bronze in K-1 1000m.
