= Katharina Scholz =

German field hockey player (born 1983)

Katharina Scholz (born 4 July 1983 in Berlin) is a German field hockey player who competed in the 2008 Summer Olympics.

Scholz posed nude in the German edition of Playboy in August 2008, alongside compatriots Nicole Reinhardt, Petra Niemann, and Romy Tarangul.
