= Dorota Kuczkowska =

Polish canoeist

Medal record

Women's canoe sprint

Representing Poland
Event	1st	2nd	3rd
Olympic Games	0	0	0
World Championships	0	1	2
European Championships	0	1	4
European Games	1	0	0
Total	0	2	6

World Championships
Silver medal – second place	2001 Poznań	K-4 1000 m
Bronze medal – third place	2001 Poznań	K-4 200 m
Bronze medal – third place	2007 Duisburg	K-2 200 m

European Championships
Silver medal – second place	2004 Poznań	K2-1000 m
Bronze medal – third place	2001 Milan	K4-200 m
Bronze medal – third place	2002 Szeged	K4-500 m
Bronze medal – third place	2007 Pontevedra	K2-500 m
Bronze medal – third place	2008 Milan	K1-200 m

Dorota Kuczkowska (born 21 July 1979 in Warsaw) is a Polish sprint canoer who has competed since the early 2000s. She won three medals at the ICF Canoe Sprint World Championships with a silver (K-4 1000 m: 2001) and two bronzes (K-2 200 m: 2007, K-4 200 m: 2001).

Kuczkowska also finished fourth in the K-4 500 m event at the 2008 Summer Olympics in Beijing.
