= Miljana Knežević =

Serbian sprint canoer

Medal record

Women's canoe sprint

Representing Serbia

World Championships
Bronze medal – third place	2007 Duisburg	K-4 200 m

European Championships
Bronze medal – third place	2008 Milan	K-4 200 m

Miljana Knežević is a Serbian sprint canoer who has competed since the late 2000s. She won a bronze medal in the K-4 200 m event at the 2007 ICF Canoe Sprint World Championships in Duisburg.
