= Tomasz Mendelski =

Polish canoeist

Medal record

Men's canoe sprint
| Event | 1st | 2nd | 3rd |
|---|---|---|---|
| Olympic Games | 0 | 0 | 0 |
| World Championships | 1 | 8 | 2 |
| European Championships | 1 | 4 | 2 |
| European Games | 1 | 0 | 0 |
| Total | 3 | 11 | 4 |

World Championships
| Silver medal – second place | 2005 Zagreb | K-1 200 m |
| Silver medal – second place | 2006 Szeged | K-4 1000 m |
| Silver medal – second place | 2007 Duisburg | K-4 1000 m |
| Bronze medal – third place | 2006 Szeged | K-4 500 m |

European Championships
| Bronze medal – third place | 2004 Poznań | K1-200 m |
| Bronze medal – third place | 2004 Poznań | K4-1000 m |
| Bronze medal – third place | 2005 Poznań | K4-1000 m |
| Bronze medal – third place | 2007 Pontevedra | K2-500 m |
| Bronze medal – third place | 2007 Pontevedra | K4-1000 m |

Tomasz Mendelski (born 21 May 1981 in Olsztyn) is a Polish sprint canoeist. Mendelski has represented Poland in both the K-1 200 m and 500 m, but specialises in the former discipline, the shortest race-distance. At the world championships he finished sixth (2001), fourth (2002) and sixth (2003) before finally making the podium at the 2005 worlds in Zagreb, Croatia, where he won the silver medal.

He also won the bronze medal at the 2004 European Championships in Poznań, Poland, finishing just in front of Spain's Jovino González.

Mendelski also won two silver medals in the K-4 1000 m event at the ICF Canoe Sprint World Championships, earning them in 2006 and 2007, and a bronze in the K-4 500 m event at 2006.

He also competed in two Summer Olympics, earning his best finish of sixth in the K-4 1000 m event at Beijing in 2008.

"Tomaj" is a member of the OKS Olstyn Canoe Club. He is 178 cm (5 ft 10 in) tall and weighs 88 kg (194 lbs).
