= 2011 Canoe Sprint European Championships =

International canoeing and kayaking event

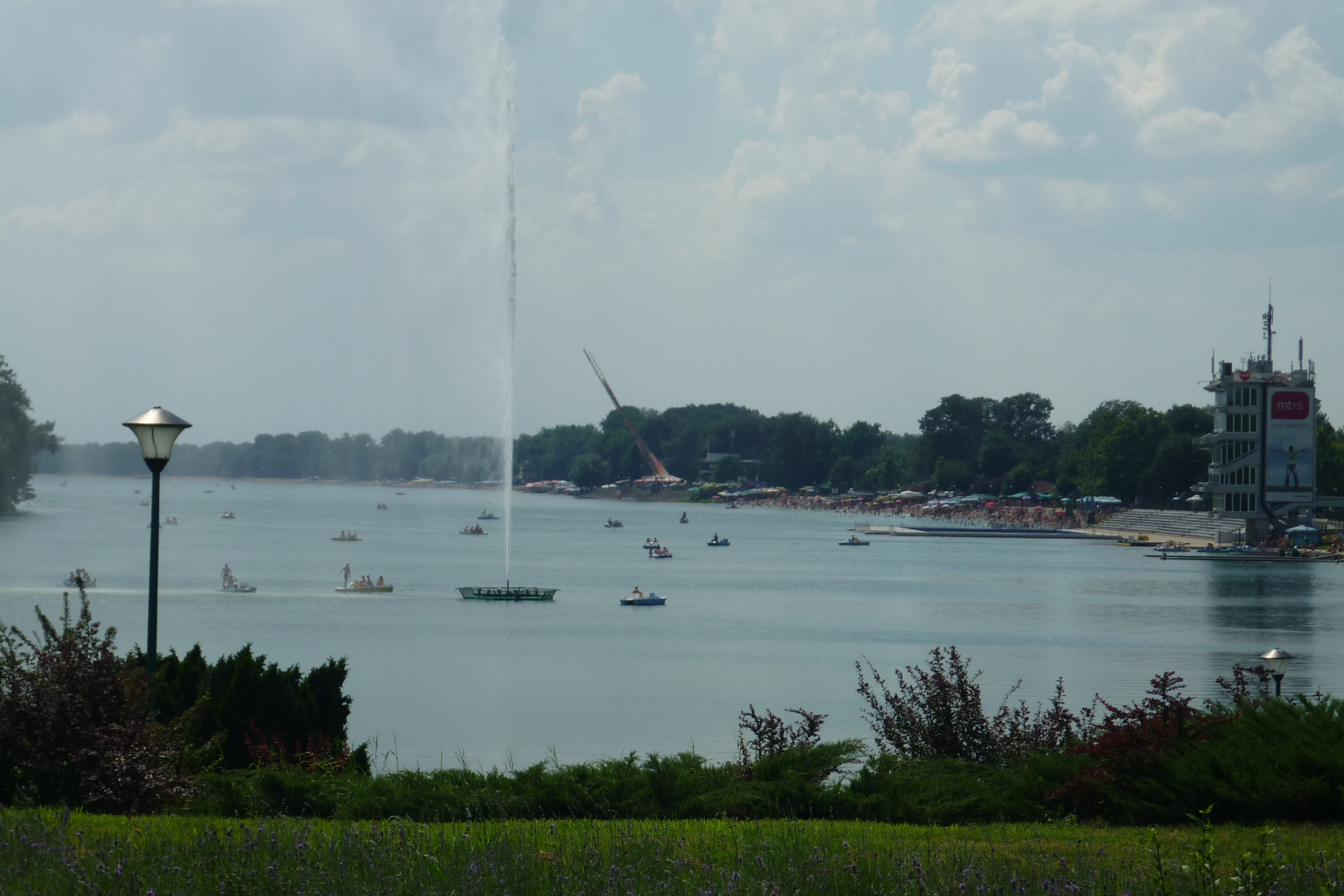
- Venue: Ada Ciganlija
- Location: Belgrade, Serbia
- Start date: 17 June
- End date: 19 June

The 2011 Canoe Sprint European Championships was held on 17–19 June at Belgrade, Serbia.

== Medal table ==
* Host nation (Serbia)

Rank	Nation	Gold	Silver	Bronze	Total
1	Hungary	6	2	2	10
2	Belarus	4	5	3	12
3	Germany	4	4	1	9
4	Russia	4	1	3	8
5	Azerbaijan	2	1	0	3
6	Poland	1	2	3	6
7	Romania	1	1	2	4
8	Great Britain	1	1	1	3
9	Portugal	1	0	3	4
10	Lithuania	1	0	0	1
11	Spain	0	3	1	4
12	Ukraine	0	1	2	3
13	Sweden	0	1	1	2
14	Norway	0	1	0	1
14	Serbia*	0	1	0	1
14	Slovakia	0	1	0	1
17	Denmark	0	0	2	2
18	Czech Republic	0	0	1	1
Totals (18 entries)		25	25	25	75

== Medal overview ==
=== Men ===
Event	Gold	Time	Silver	Time	Bronze	Time
C-1 200 m	Valentyn Demyanenko (AZE)	39.855	Alfonso Benavides Lopez De Ayala (ESP)	40.047	Yuriy Cheban (UKR)	40.161
C-1 500 m	Valentyn Demyanenko (AZE)	1:50.681	Paweł Baraszkiewicz (POL)	1:50.693	Dzianis Harasha (BLR)	1:50.939
C-1 1000 m	Sebastian Brendel (GER)	3:47.155	Josif Chirilă (ROM)	3:49.645	José Luis Bouza (ESP)	3:50.065
C-1 5000 m	Sebastian Brendel (GER)	24:07.383	José Luis Bouza (ESP)	24:15.819	Lukáš Koranda (CZE)	24:28.725
C-2 200 m	Lithuania; Raimundas Labuckas; Tomas Gadeikis	37.416	Belarus; Aleksandr Vauchetskiy; Dzmitry Rabchanka	37.866	Hungary; Attila Bozsik; Gábor Horváth	37.914
C-2 500 m	Romania; Alexandru Dumitrescu; Victor Mihalachi	01:41.641	Azerbaijan; Sergiy Bezugliy; Maksym Prokopenko	01:41.689	Poland; Roman Rynkiewicz; Mariusz Kruk	01:41.959
C-2 1000 m	Russia; Alexey Korovashkov; Ilya Pervukhin	3:28.584	Belarus; Andrei Bahdanovich; Aliaksandr Bahdanovich	3:28.614	Romania; Victor Mihalachi; Alexandru Dumitrescu	3:28.818
C-4 1000 m	Hungary; Márton Tóth; Mátyás Sáfrán; Mihály Sáfrán; Róbert Mike	3:16.042	Belarus; Andrei Bahdanovich; Dzmitry Rabchanka; Aliaksandr Bahdanovich; Aleksandr Vauchetskiy	3:16.270	Russia; Ivan Kuznetsov; Rasul Ishmukhamedov; Kirill Shamshurin; Vladimir Chernyshkov	3:16.528
K-1 200 m	Piotr Siemionowski (POL)	35.418	Péter Molnár (HUN)	35.460	Ed McKeever (GBR)	35.538
K-1 500 m	Yury Postrigay (RUS)	01:39.418	Anders Gustafsson (SWE)	01:39.532	Kasper Bleibach (DEN)	01:39.550
K-1 1000 m	Max Hoff (GER)	03:22.485 WB	Aleh Yurenia (BLR)	03:25.029	Fernando Pimenta (POR)	03:25.881
K-1 5000 m	Aleh Yurenia (BLR)	20:45.612	Eirik Verås Larsen (NOR)	20:45.966	René Holten Poulsen (DEN)	21:04.908
K-2 200 m	United Kingdom; Liam Heath; Jonathon Schofield	32.487	Belarus; Raman Piatrushenka; Vadzim Makhneu	32.775	Sweden; Anders Svensson; Christian Svanqvist	32.793
K-2 500 m	Belarus; Raman Piatrushenka; Vadzim Makhneu	01:30.355	Slovakia; Erik Vlček; Peter Gelle	01:30.601	Portugal; Emanuel Silva; João Ribeiro	01:30.739
K-2 1000 m	Germany; Andreas Ihle; Martin Hollstein	3:07.095	Russia; Vitaly Yurchenko; Vasily Pogreban	3:07.827	Hungary; Roland Kökény; Rudolf Dombi	3:08.205
K-4 1000 m	Portugal; Fernando Pimenta; João Ribeiro; Emanuel Silva; David Fernandes	2:49.618	Germany; Max Hoff; Marcus Gross; Norman Bröckl; Robert Gleinert	2:49.960	Romania; Ionel Gavrila; Ştefan Vasile; Toni Ioneticu; Traian Neagu	2:50.056

=== Women ===
Event	Gold	Time	Silver	Time	Bronze	Time
C-1 200 m	Maria Kazakova (RUS)	50.455	Lydia Weber (GER)	52.999	Katsiaryna Herasimenka (BLR)	53.275
C-2 500 m (Exhibition)	Belarus; Katsiaryna Herasimenka; Svitlana Tulupava	2:14.554	Hungary; Kincső Takács; Dorina Obermayer	2:14.554	Russia; Vetra Bardak; Anastasia Ganina	2:14.554
K-1 200 m	Natalia Lobova (RUS)	40.120	Maria Teresa Portela (ESP)	40.282	Teresa Portela (POR)	40.300
K-1 500 m	Danuta Kozák (HUN)	1:51.552	Inna Osypenko-Radomska (UKR)	1:53.154	Ewelina Wojnarowska (POL)	1:54.204
K-1 1000 m	Katalin Kovács (HUN)	3:55.232	Antonija Nađ (SRB)	3:57.716	Edyta Dzieniszewska (POL)	4:02.732
K-1 5000 m	Maryna Paltaran (BLR)	23:12.661	Lani Belcher (GBR)	23:21.415	Ludmila Galushko (UKR)	23:28.315
K-2 200 m	Hungary; Danuta Kozák; Katalin Kovács	37.820	Germany; Tina Dietze; Franziska Weber	38.036	Belarus; Maryna Paltaran; Volha Khudzenka	38.300
K-2 500 m	Hungary; Tamara Csipes; Katalin Kovács	1:40.207	Poland; Aneta Konieczna; Beata Mikołajczyk	1:40.339	Russia; Yuliana Salakhova; Anastasia Sergeeva	1:41.671
K-2 1000 m	Hungary; Tamara Csipes; Gabriella Szabó	3:31.741	Germany; Franziska Weber; Tina Dietze	3:32.629	Russia; Anastasia Sergeeva; Yuliana Salakhova	3:34.927
K-4 500 m	Belarus; Iryna Pamialova; Nadzeya Papok; Volha Khudzenka; Maryna Paltaran	1:33.088	Hungary; Dalma Benedek; Danuta Kozák; Anna Kárász; Gabriella Szabó	1:34.006	Germany; Tina Dietze; Carolin Leonhardt; Silke Hörmann; Franziska Weber	1:34.834
