= Vytautas Vaičikonis =

Lithuanian sprint canoer

Medal record

Men's canoe sprint

World Championships
Silver medal – second place	2007 Duisburg	K-1 200 m

European Championships
Gold medal – first place	2008 Milan	K-1 200 m

Vytautas Vaičikonis is a Lithuanian sprint canoer who has competed since the mid-1990s. He won few junior titles, silver medal in the K-1 200 m at the 2007 ICF Canoe Sprint World Championships in Duisburg and gold medal in the K1-200 m at the 2008 ICF Canoe Sprint European Championships in Milan. Also he was medalist at various World Cup events and other races.
