= Krisztina Fazekas-Zur =

Hungarian canoeist (born 1980)

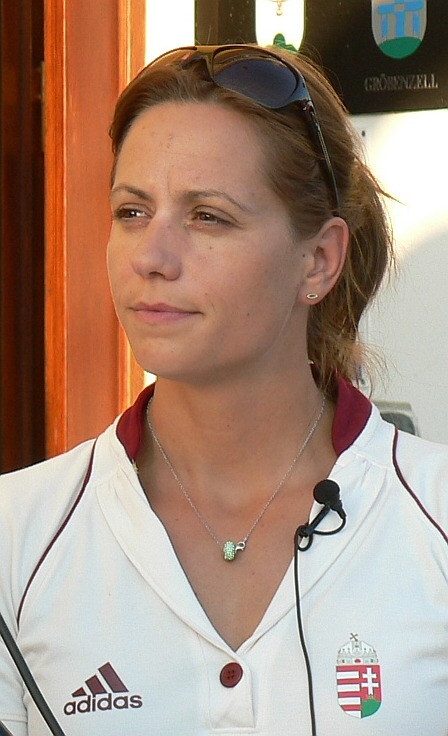
- Fazekas-Zur in 2012

Personal information
- Nationality: Hungarian
- Born: 1 August 1980 (age 46) Budapest, Hungary
- Height: 172 cm (5 ft 8 in)
- Weight: 64 kg (141 lb)

Sport
- Sport: Canoe sprint
- Club: Budapest SE (1990–1997); Újpesti TE (1997–2000); MTK (2001–2009); Győri VSE (2012–)
- Coached by: Rami Zur (husband); Botond Storcz (national)
Medal record
Women's canoe sprint
Representing Hungary
Olympic Games
| Gold medal – first place | 2012 London | K-4 500 m |
| Gold medal – first place | 2016 Rio de Janeiro | K-4 500 m |
World Championships
| Gold medal – first place | 2001 Poznań | K-4 200 m |
| Gold medal – first place | 2003 Gainesville | K-4 1000 m |
| Gold medal – first place | 2006 Szeged | K-4 500 m |
| Gold medal – first place | 2007 Duisburg | K-4 1000 m |
| Gold medal – first place | 2013 Duisburg | K-2 1000 m |
| Gold medal – first place | 2013 Duisburg | K-4 500 m |
| Gold medal – first place | 2013 Duisburg | K-1 4×200 m |
| Gold medal – first place | 2017 Račice | K-4 500 m |
| Silver medal – second place | 2007 Duisburg | K-4 200 m |
| Silver medal – second place | 2007 Duisburg | K-4 500 m |
| Silver medal – second place | 2009 Dartmouth | K-1 4×200 m |
| Silver medal – second place | 2009 Dartmouth | K-4 200 m |
| Silver medal – second place | 2015 Milan | K-4 500 m |
European Championships
| Gold medal – first place | 2006 Račice | K-4 500 m |
| Gold medal – first place | 2007 Pontevedra | K-4 1000 m |
| Gold medal – first place | 2008 Milan | K-4 200 m |
| Gold medal – first place | 2008 Milan | K-4 1000 m |
| Gold medal – first place | 2009 Brandenburg | K-4 200 m |
| Gold medal – first place | 2016 Moscow | K-4 500 m |
| Silver medal – second place | 2005 Poznań | K-4 200 m |
| Silver medal – second place | 2007 Pontevedra | K-4 200 m |
| Silver medal – second place | 2007 Pontevedra | K-4 500 m |
| Silver medal – second place | 2008 Milan | K-4 500 m |
| Bronze medal – third place | 2008 Milan | K-2 200 m |
| Bronze medal – third place | 2012 Zagreb | K-4 500 m |
Representing United States
World Championships
| Silver medal – second place | 2011 Szeged | K-1 1000 m |

Krisztina Fazekas-Zur (born 1 August 1980) is a Hungarian sprint canoer who has competed since the mid-2000s. She won nine medals at the ICF Canoe Sprint World Championships with four golds (K-4 200 m: 2001, K-4 500 m: 2006, K-4 1000 m: 2003, 2007) and five silvers (K-1 4 × 200 m: 2009, K-4 200 m: 2007, 2009; K-4 500 m: 2007; K-1 1000 m: 2011).

Fazekas-Zur also won gold medals in the kayak four (K-4) 500 m team event at the 2012 and 2016 Olympics.

== Personal life ==
Fazekas-Zur took up canoeing aged 10 together with her sister, following the example of her brother. She is married to her coach Rami Zur, a former Olympic canoeist for Israel and United States; they have a son Noah. She lives in California and represented the United States in 2011, but returned to competing for Hungary winning gold at the 2012 Summer Olympics and also at the 2016 Summer Olympics in Rio.

In 2013, she founded the Path of Champions Foundation (Hungarian: Bajnokok Utja Alapitvany) that aims to help children through sport.

== Awards ==
- For Pilisvörösvár award (2006)
- Honorary Citizen of Pilisvörösvár (2012)
- Pilisvörösvár Jubilee Medal (2012)
- Perpetual champion of Hungarian Kayak-Canoe (2012)

Orders and special awards

- Order of Merit of Hungary – Officer's Cross (2012)
- Order of Merit of Hungary – Commander's Cross (2016)
