= Márton Metka =

Hungarian canoeist

Medal record

Men's canoe sprint

World Championships
Bronze medal – third place	2007 Duisburg	C-4 1000 m

Márton Metka is a Hungarian sprint canoer who has competed since 2007. He won a bronze medal in the C-4 1000 m event at the 2007 ICF Canoe Sprint World Championships in Duisburg.
