= Ognjen Filipović =

Serbian canoeist

Medal record

Men's canoe sprint

Representing Yugoslavia / Serbia and Montenegro / Serbia

World Championships
| Gold medal – first place | 2005 Zagreb | K-2 200 m |
| Gold medal – first place | 2006 Szeged | K-4 200 m |
| Silver medal – second place | 2007 Duisburg | K-4 200 m |
| Bronze medal – third place | 1998 Szeged | K-1 200 m |
| Bronze medal – third place | 2006 Szeged | K-2 200 m |
| Bronze medal – third place | 2007 Duisburg | K-2 200 m |

European Championships
| Gold medal – first place | 2007 Pontevedra | K-4 200 m |
| Silver medal – second place | 1999 Zagreb | K-1 200 m |
| Silver medal – second place | 2008 Milan | K-4 200 m |
| Bronze medal – third place | 2005 Poznań | K-2 200 m |
| Bronze medal – third place | 2007 Pontevedra | K-2 200 m |

Mediterranean Games
| Bronze medal – third place | 2005 Almería | K-2 500 m |

Ognjen Filipović (Serbian Cyrillic: Огњен Филиповић, born 17 October 1973 in Sremska Mitrovica) is a Serbian sprint canoer who competed for Serbia and Montenegro and later Serbia. He won six medals at the ICF Canoe Sprint World Championships with two golds (K-2 200 m: 2005 for Serbia and Montenegro, K-4 200 m: 2006 for Serbia), a silver K-4 200 m: 2007 for Serbia), and three bronzes (K-1 200 m: 1998 for Yugoslavia, K-2 200 m: 2006 for Serbia, 2007 for Serbia).

Filipović also competed in two Summer Olympics, both for Serbia and Montenegro. At the 2000 Summer Olympics in Sydney, he was eliminated in the semifinal round of the K-1 500 m event. Four years later, Filipović was eliminated in the semifinals again, both in the K-2 500 m and K-2 1000 m events.

Filipović, nicknamed Ogi, is a member of the Čačak canoe club.
