= Monika Borowicz =

Polish sprint canoer

Medal record

Women's canoe sprint

World Championships
Bronze medal – third place	2007 Duisburg	K-4 500 m

European Championships
Bronze medal – third place	2007 Pontevedra	K2-500 m

Monika Borowicz (born 5 January 1982) is a Polish sprint canoer who has competed since the late 2000s. She won a bronze medal in the K-4 500 m event at the 2007 ICF Canoe Sprint World Championships in Duisburg.
