= Stanislav Strelchanka =

Belarusian canoeist

Medal record

Men's canoe sprint

World Championships
Silver medal – second place	2007 Duisburg	K-4 500 m

Stanislav Sterlchanka is a Belarusian sprint canoer who has competed since the late 2000s. He won a silver medal in the K-4 500 m at the 2007 ICF Canoe Sprint World Championships in Duisburg.
