= Nikolay Lipkin =

Russian sprint canoeist (born 1985)

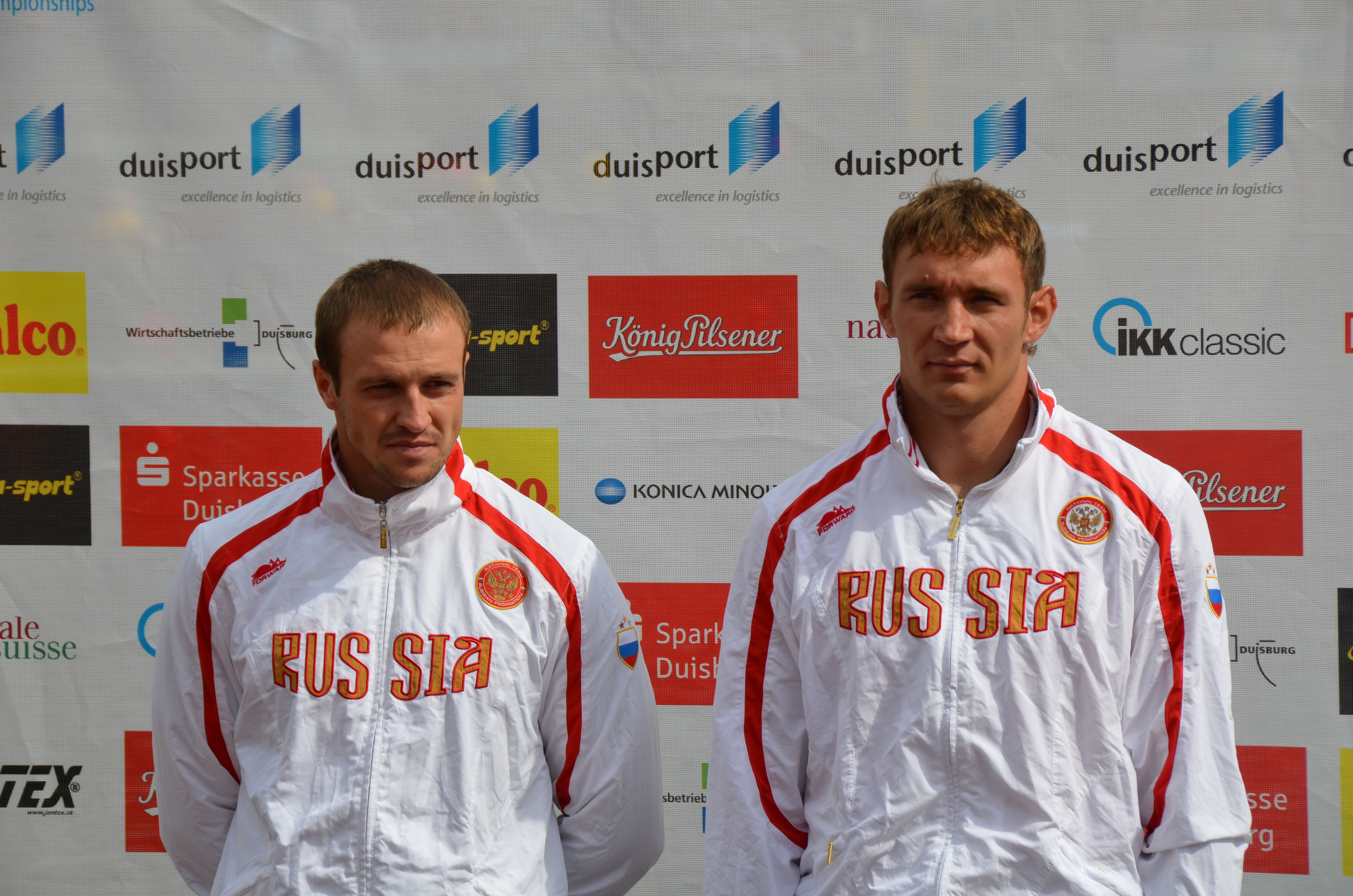
- Lipkin (right) with Alexander Kovalenko at the 2013 World Championships

Medal record

Men's sprint canoeing

World Championships
Gold medal – first place	2005 Zagreb	C-2 200 m
Gold medal – first place	2006 Szeged	C-1 200 m
Gold medal – first place	2009 Dartmouth	C-1 4 x 200 m
Gold medal – first place	2010 Poznań	C-1 4 x 200 m
Gold medal – first place	2014 Moscow	C-1 4x200 m
Silver medal – second place	2007 Duisburg	C-4 200 m
Silver medal – second place	2009 Dartmouth	C-1 200 m
Silver medal – second place	2009 Dartmouth	C-1 500 m
Silver medal – second place	2009 Dartmouth	C-4 200 m
Silver medal – second place	2011 Szeged	C-2 200 m
Silver medal – second place	2013 Duisburg	C-2 200 m
Bronze medal – third place	2009 Dartmouth	C-2 1000 m

European Championships
Gold medal – first place	2013 Montemor-o-Velho	C-2 200 m

Nikolay Lipkin (Russian: Николай Липкин, born 20 May 1985 in Kasimov, Ryazan Oblast) is a Russian sprint canoeist who has competed since 2003. He received a four-year ban for steroid doping, and was stripped of a title he won in 2014 in Moscow.

In 2003 he was a member of the Russia Canadian canoe C-4 500m crew that won the junior world championships in Komatsu, Japan. He also claimed two individual (C-1) medals – silver over 500m and bronze in the 1000 m. Lipkin's potential was shown at the European under-23 Championships in Poznań, where he won the C-1 500 m bronze medal despite the fact that many of his rivals were three years older.

Since then he has continued his rapid progress. In 2005 he became the first of the junior canoe champions from Komatsu to win a senior world championship title. At the age of just twenty, he partnered Yevgeny Ignatov to victory in the C-2 200 m final at the world championship in Zagreb, Croatia. They edged out Christian Gille and Tomasz Wylenzek by just 0.024 secs, thereby preventing a clean sweep by the German duo.

After these successes Lipkin began the transition to the longer distance C-1 500m in preparation for the 2008 Summer Olympics, where there will be no 200 m races. He didn't appear at the 2006 European Senior Championships; instead he was entered for the under-23 championships in Schinias, Greece, where he won two titles, the C-1 500m and also the C-2 500m (with Ilya Shtokalov). At the senior world championships in Szeged. Hungary. however he returned to the 200 m distance and became individual C-1 champion ahead of Ukraine's Valentin Demyanenko. Lipkin won a silver in the C-4 200 m event at the 2007 championships in Duisburg. He also won five medals at the 2009 championships in Dartmouth (Gold: C-1 4 × 200 m, Silver: C-1 200 m, C-1 500 m, C-4 200 m; Bronze: C-2 1000 m), the most among any Canadian canoeist at the championships. Lipkin added gold again in 2010, but only in the C-1 4 × 200 m.

Lipkin now lives in Bronnitsy, (Moscow region) and is a member of the Dinamo Moscow club. He is 190 cm tall and weighs 91 kg.
