= Attila Boros =

Hungarian sprint canoer

Medal record

Men's canoe sprint

World Championships
Silver medal – second place	2006 Szeged	K-4 500 m
Bronze medal – third place	2007 Duisburg	K-4 500 m

Attila Boros is a Hungarian sprint canoer who has competed since the mid first decade of the 21st century. He won two medals in the K-4 500 m at the ICF Canoe Sprint World Championships with a silver in 2006 and a bronze in 2007.
