= Sergey Findziukevich =

Belarusian sprint canoer

Medal record

Men's canoe sprint

World Championships
Silver medal – second place	2007 Duisburg	K-4 500 m

Sergey Findziukevich is a Belarusian sprint canoer who has competed since the late 2000s. He won a silver medal in the K-4 500 m at the 2007 ICF Canoe Sprint World Championships in Duisburg.
