= Yevgeniy Dorokhin =

Russian sprint canoer

Medal record

Men's canoe sprint

World Championships
Silver medal – second place	2007 Duisburg	C-4 200 m

Yevgeniy Dorokhin is a Russian sprint canoer who competed in the mid-2000s. He won a silver medal in the C-4 200 m event at the 2007 ICF Canoe Sprint World Championships in Duisburg.
