= Friedericke Leue =

German canoeist

Medal record

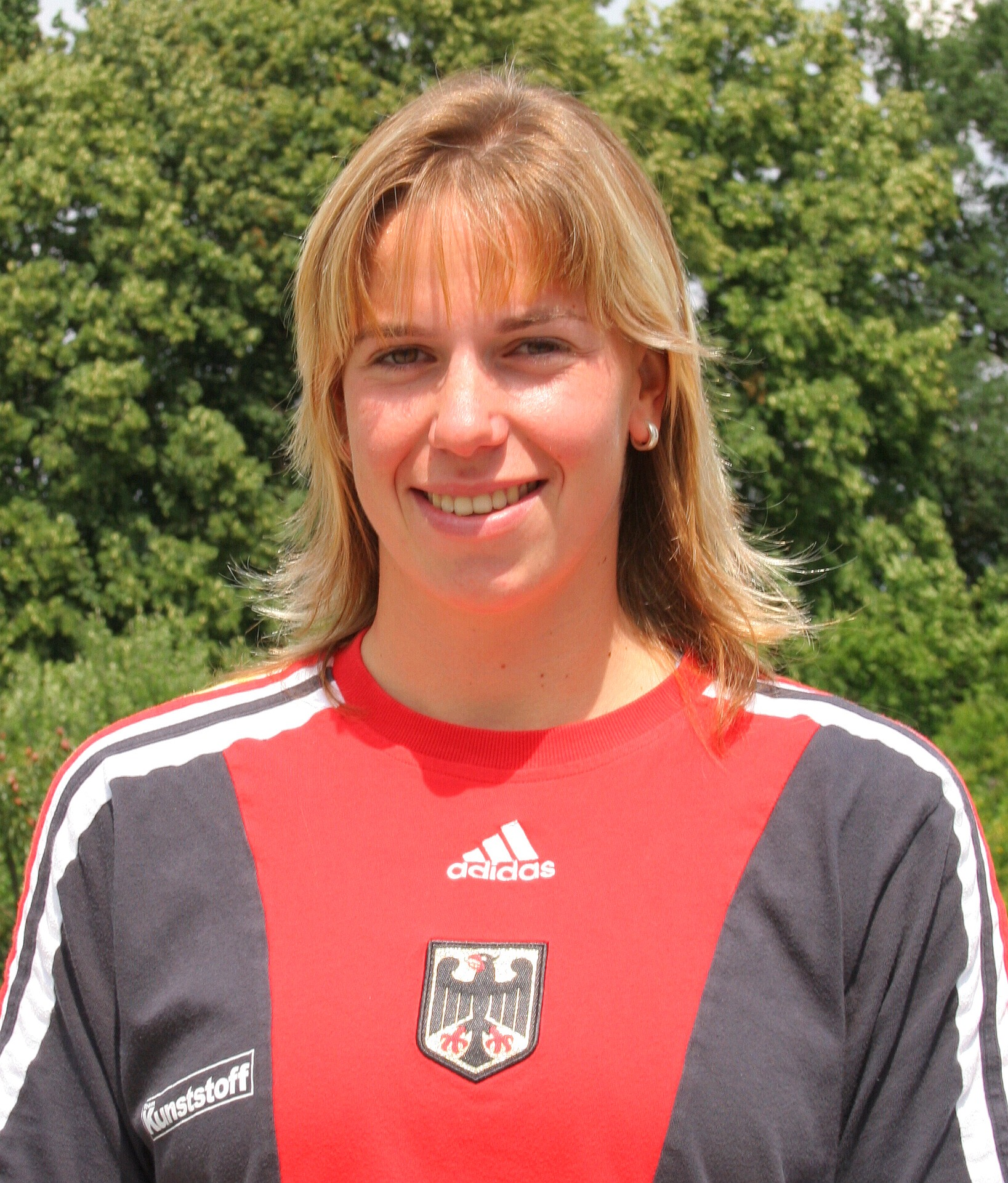
Women's canoe sprint Friederike in 2007

World Championships
Silver medal – second place	2007 Duisburg	K-1 1000 m
Bronze medal – third place	2007 Duisburg	K-4 1000 m

Friedericke Leue is a German sprint canoer who has competed since the late 2000s. She won two medals at the 2007 ICF Canoe Sprint World Championships in Duisburg with a silver in the K-1 1000 m and a bronze in the K-4 1000 m events.
