= Krystyna Borowicz =

Polish actress

Krystyna Borowicz (25 January 1923, Kalisz – 30 May 2009, Warsaw) was a Polish actress.

Borowicz made her debut in 1950 portraying the works of Alexander Fadeyev, directed by Ludwik René at the Polish Theatre in Warsaw. From 1950 to 1960 she acted at the Polish Theatre in Warsaw, and from 1960 until her retirement in 1990 at the Ateneum Theatre. In the years 1957 to 1990, she starred in 16 plays on Television Theatre.

She died on 30 May 2009 in Warsaw. She was buried in Augsburg.
