= Dragan Zorić =

Serbian canoeist

- Born: 20 May 1979 (age 46); Bačka Palanka, SFR Yugoslavia
- Occupation: Canoer

Dragan Zorić
Medal record

Men's canoe sprint

Representing Serbia and Montenegro / Serbia

World Championships
Gold medal – first place	2005 Zagreb	K-2 200 m
Gold medal – first place	2006 Szeged	K-4 200 m
Bronze medal – third place	2006 Szeged	K-2 200 m
Silver medal – second place	2007 Duisburg	K-4 200 m
Bronze medal – third place	2007 Duisburg	K-2 200 m

European Championships
Bronze medal – third place	2005 Poznań	K-2 200 m
Bronze medal – third place	2007 Pontevedra	K-2 200 m
Gold medal – first place	2007 Pontevedra	K-4 200 m
Silver medal – second place	2008 Milan	K-4 200 m

Mediterranean Games
Bronze medal – third place	2005 Almería	K-2 500 m

European U23 Canoe Sprint Championships
Silver medal – second place	2002 Zagreb	K-2 1000 m
Bronze medal – third place	2002 Zagreb	K-1 500 m

Dragan Zorić (Serbian Cyrillic: Драган Зорић; born 20 May 1979, in Bačka Palanka) is a Serbian sprint canoer who has competed from the late 1990s to 2007. Until 2006, he competed for Serbia and Montenegro. Zorić won five medals at the ICF Canoe Sprint World Championships with two golds (K-2 200 m: 2005, K-4 200 m: 2006), a silver (K-4 200 m: 2007, and two bronzes (K-2 200 m: 2006, 2007).

Competing in two Summer Olympics, his best finish was ninth in the K-4 1000 m event at Sydney in 2000.

Zorić is a member of the Sintelon Canoe Club in Bačka Palanka. He is 196 cm (6 ft 5 in) tall and weighs 97 kg (214 lb).
