= Sofia Paldanius =

Swedish canoeist (born 1979)

Personal information
- Full name: Karin Sofia Paldanius
- Born: 16 March 1979 (age 47) Gothenburg, Sweden
- Height: 181 cm (5 ft 11 in)
- Weight: 75 kg (165 lb)

Sport
- Club: Jonkopings KK
Medal record
Women's canoe sprint
Representing Sweden
World Championships
Bronze medal – third place	2006 Szeged	K-4 200 m
Bronze medal – third place	2007 Duisburg	K-1 1000 m
Bronze medal – third place	2009 Dartmouth	K-2 500 m
Bronze medal – third place	2010 Poznań	K-1 1000 m
European Championships
Silver medal – second place	2014 Brandenburg	K-1 1000 m

Karin Sofia Paldanius (born 16 March 1979) is a Swedish sprint canoer who has competed since the mid-2000s. Her latest success is when she was fourth at the Olympic Games in London in K1 500 2012. She won four bronze medals at the ICF Canoe Sprint World Championships (K-1 1000 m: 2007, 2010; K-2 500 m: 2009, K-4 200 m: 2006).

Paldanius also competed in four Summer Olympics, earning her best finish of fourth in the K-2 500 m event at London in 2012.

In January 2017 it was announced she would stop competing at top-level.
