= Gesine Ruge =

German canoeist

Medal record

Women's canoe sprint

World Championships
Gold medal – first place	2007 Duisburg	K-2 1000 m
Bronze medal – third place	2006 Szeged	K-2 500 m
Bronze medal – third place	2007 Duisburg	K-4 1000 m

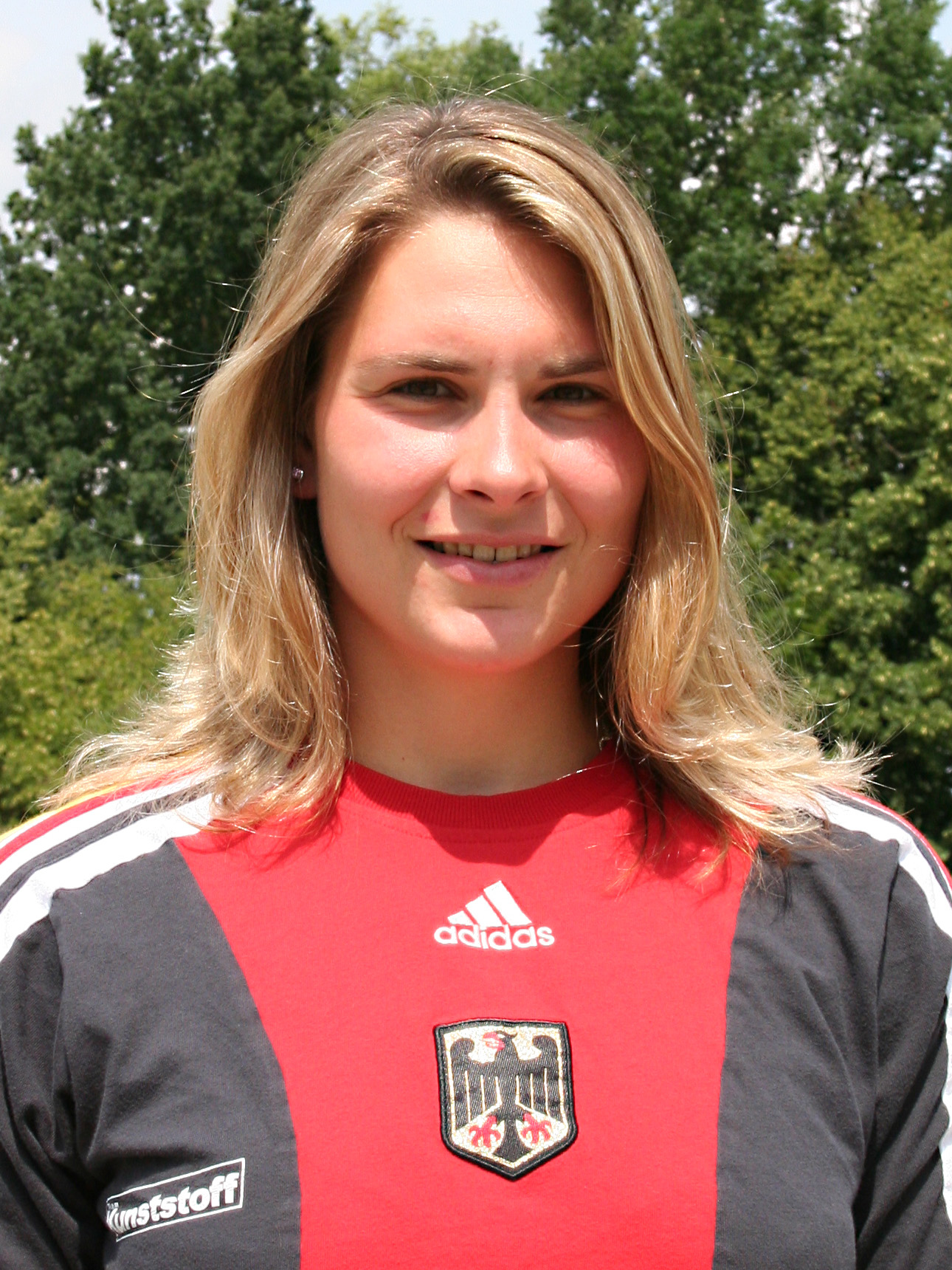

Gesine Ruge is a German sprint canoer who has competed since the mid-2000s. She won three medals at the ICF Canoe Sprint World Championships with a gold (K-2 1000 m: 2007) and two bronzes (K-2 500 m: 2006, K-4 1000 m: 2007).
