= Maren Knebel =

German sprint canoer (born 1985)

Medal record

Women's canoe sprint

World Championships
Gold medal – first place	2007 Duisburg	K-4 200 m
Gold medal – first place	2007 Duisburg	K-4 500 m
Bronze medal – third place	2005 Zagreb	K-4 1000 m

Maren Knebel (born 1985) is a German sprint canoer who has competed since the mid-2000s. She won three medals at the ICF Canoe Sprint World Championships with two golds (K-4 200 m and K-4 500 m: both 2007) and a bronze (K-4 1000 m: 2005).
