= Bora Sibinkić =

Serbian canoeist

Medal record

Men's canoe sprint

Representing Serbia

World Championships
Gold medal – first place	2006 Szeged	K-4 200 m
Silver medal – second place	2007 Duisburg	K-4 200 m

European Championships
Gold medal – first place	2007 Pontevedra	K-4 200 m
Silver medal – second place	2008 Milan	K-4 200 m

Bora Sibinkić (Serbian Cyrillic: Бора Сибинкић, born 20 June 1978) is a Serbian sprint canoer who has competed since the late first decade of the 21st century. He won two medals in the K-4 200 m event at the ICF Canoe Sprint World Championships with a gold in 2006 and a bronze in 2007.

Sibinkić was born in Novi Sad. He started his career aged 10 in KK Liman, Novi Sad. His older brother Petar Sibinkić participated in Olympic Games in 1996 and 2000. He is currently the president and member of the KKK Vojvodina, a local kayak and canoe club.
