= Josif Chirilă =

Romanian canoeist

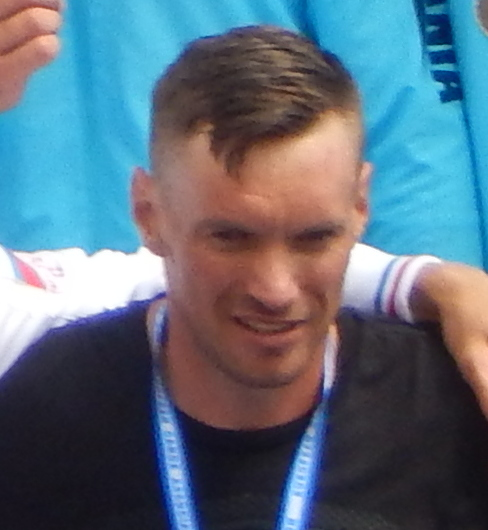

Medal record

Men's canoe sprint

Representing Romania

World Championships
Gold medal – first place	2005 Zagreb	C-4 500 m
Gold medal – first place	2007 Duisburg	C-4 1000 m
Gold medal – first place	2015 Milan	C-4 1000 m
Silver medal – second place	2007 Duisburg	C-2 500 m
Bronze medal – third place	2009 Dartmouth	C-4 1000 m

European Championships
Silver medal – second place	2011 Belgrade	C-1 1000 m
Silver medal – second place	2012 Zagreb	C-4 1000 m
Silver medal – second place	2013 Montemor-o-Velho	C-4 1000 m

Josif Chirilă (sometimes listed as Iosif Chirilă, born 5 January 1983) is a Romanian sprint canoer who has competed since 2004. He won four medals at the ICF Canoe Sprint World Championships with two golds (C-4 500 m: 2005, C-4 1000 m: 2007), a silver (C-2 500 m: 2007), and a bronze (C-4 1000 m: 2009).

Chirilă also finished sixth in the C-2 500 m event at the 2008 Summer Olympics in Beijing.
