= Tímea Paksy =

Hungarian canoeist

Medal record

Women's canoe sprint

World Championships
Gold medal – first place	2002 Seville	K-4 200 m
Gold medal – first place	2003 Gainesville	K-2 200 m
Gold medal – first place	2003 Gainesville	K-2 1000 m
Gold medal – first place	2005 Zagreb	K-4 1000 m
Gold medal – first place	2006 Szeged	K-1 200 m
Gold medal – first place	2006 Szeged	K-4 200 m
Gold medal – first place	2006 Szeged	K-4 500 m
Gold medal – first place	2006 Szeged	K-4 1000 m
Gold medal – first place	2007 Duisburg	K-4 1000 m
Silver medal – second place	2007 Duisburg	K-2 500 m
Silver medal – second place	2007 Duisburg	K-4 200 m
Silver medal – second place	2007 Duisburg	K-4 500 m
Silver medal – second place	2009 Dartmouth	K-1 4 x 200 m
Silver medal – second place	2009 Dartmouth	K-4 200 m
Silver medal – second place	2010 Poznań	K-1 4 x 200 m
Bronze medal – third place	2002 Seville	K-4 1000 m
Bronze medal – third place	2003 Gainesville	K-1 200 m
Bronze medal – third place	2005 Zagreb	K-4 500 m

Tímea Paksy (born 22 January 1983) is a Hungarian canoe sprinter who has competed since the early 2000s. She won eighteen medals at the ICF Canoe Sprint World Championships with nine golds (K-1 200 m: 2006, K-2 200 m: 2003, K-2 1000 m: 2003, K-4 200 m: 2002, 2006; K-4 500 m: 2006, K-4 1000 m: 2005, 2006, 2007), six silvers (K-1 4 × 200 m: 2009, 2010; K-2 500 m: 2007, K-4 200 m: 2007, 2009; K-4 500 m: 2007), and three bronzes (K-1 200 m: 2003, K-4 500 m: 2005, K-4 1000 m: 2002).
