= Tim Brabants =

British sprint kayaker

Tim Brabants MBE
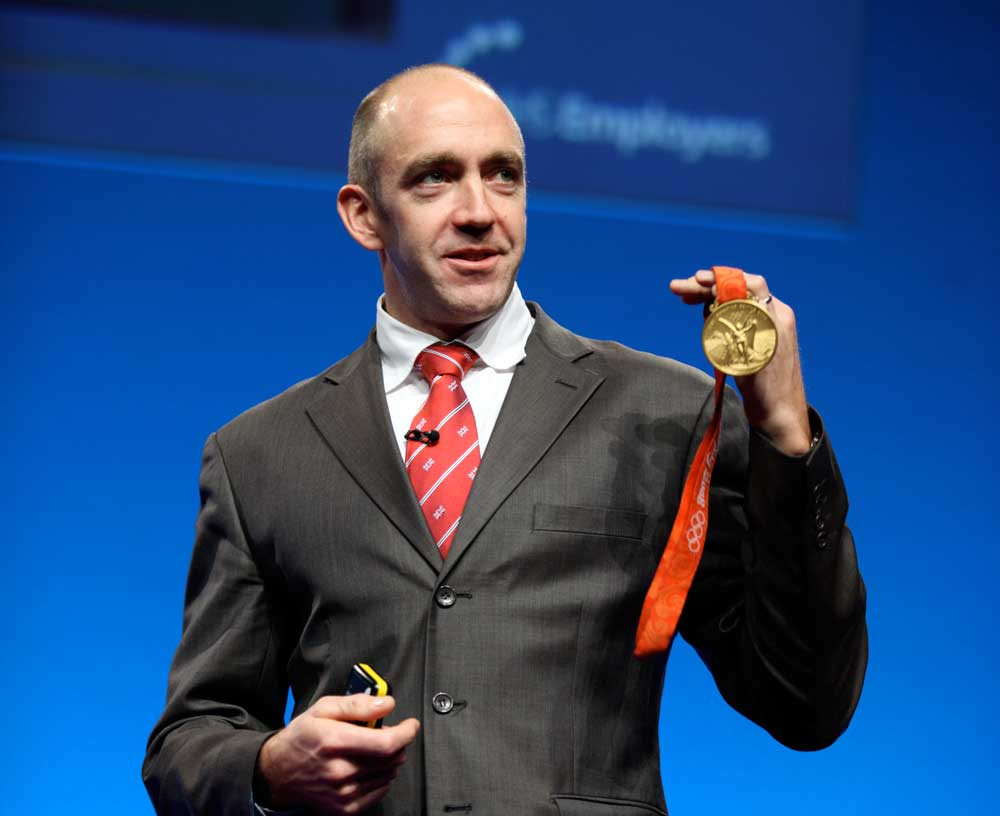
- Brabants in 2011

Personal information
- Full name: Jules Timothy Brabants
- Nationality: British
- Born: 23 January 1977 (age 49) Chertsey, Surrey, England, United Kingdom
- Occupation: Doctor
- Height: 1.88 m (6 ft 2 in)
- Weight: 85 kg (187 lb)
- Website: TimBrabants.com
Medal record
Representing Great Britain
Men's canoe sprint
Olympic Games
Gold medal – first place	2008 Beijing	K-1 1000 m
Bronze medal – third place	2000 Sydney	K-1 1000 m
Bronze medal – third place	2008 Beijing	K-1 500 m
World Championships
Gold medal – first place	2007 Duisburg	K-1 1000 m
Silver medal – second place	2006 Szeged	K-1 1000 m
Silver medal – second place	2007 Duisburg	K-1 500 m
Silver medal – second place	2010 Poznań	K-1 1000 m
Men's canoe marathon
World Championships
Silver medal – second place	1998 Cape Town	K-2 marathon

Jules Timothy Brabants MBE (born 23 January 1977) is a British sprint kayaker who has competed since the late 1990s. Competing in four Summer Olympics, he won three medals with one gold (2008: K-1 1000 m) and two bronzes (2000: K-1 1000 m, 2008: K-1 500 m).

== Early life and education ==
Tim Brabants was born in Chertsey. He first began his canoeing career at Elmbridge Canoe Club in Elmbridge.

Brabants was educated at the Salesian School, a Voluntary Aided co-educational Roman Catholic comprehensive school in Chertsey, Surrey, followed by the University of Nottingham.

== Career ==
Brabants trained at Royal Canoe Club, the world's oldest canoe club located in Teddington, London.

Brabants won the K-1 1000 m European championship at Szeged, Hungary in 2002, the first time a British paddler had won the blue riband event.

The 2004 Olympics however were a disappointment. Brabants had won a European silver medal at Poznań earlier in the season and was the fastest qualifier for the Olympic K-1 1000 m final with the world's fastest time of 3:24.412. However, in the final itself he finished in fifth place.

He took a year off from competitive kayaking in 2005 to complete his medical studies at the University of Nottingham followed by a spell as a doctor in Jersey. However, he returned to action in 2006, winning the gold medal in Račice in the K-1 1000 m event at the European Championships and the silver medal in the same event at the World Championships in Szeged in August 2006, finishing just 0.06 seconds behind Sweden's Markus Oscarsson.

2007 was an even better year. Brabants competed in the K-1 500 m discipline as well and at the European Championships won Silver for the 1000 m and Gold for the 500 m. At the 2007 World Championships in Duisburg, Brabants won gold in the K-1 1000 m and silver in the K-1 500 m events, thus securing a place for Great Britain at the 2008 Summer Olympics in Beijing.

At these games Brabants made his way into the history books by being the first Briton to win a gold medal in either the sprint or slalom kayak discipline. This he achieved by a convincing win in the K-1 1000 m, leading from start to finish.

Although best known as a sprinter, Brabants' first success as a senior international had in fact come in the marathon. He won a silver medal at the 1998 World Canoe Marathon Championships in Cape Town, South Africa.

Brabants is a member of the Nottingham Kayak Club and is a physician by profession. He is 188 cm (6'2) tall and weighs 85 kg (187 lbs).

Brabants was appointed a Member of the Order of the British Empire (MBE) in the 2009 New Year Honours for services to sport. In 2010, he won a silver in the K-1 1000 m event at the world championships.

Brabants was selected for the canoe sprint team for London Olympics 2012, where he finished 8th.
