= Márton Sík =

Hungarian sprint canoer (born 1984)

Medal record

Men's canoe sprint

World Championships
Silver medal – second place	2006 Szeged	K-4 500 m
Bronze medal – third place	2007 Duisburg	K-4 500 m

Márton Sík (born January 28, 1984) is a Hungarian sprint canoer who has competed since the mid-2000s. He won two medals in the K-4 500 m at the ICF Canoe Sprint World Championships with a silver in 2006 and a bronze in 2007.

Sík also finished fifth in the K-4 1000 m event at the 2008 Summer Olympics in Beijing.
