= Niculae Flocea =

Romanian sprint canoer

Medal record

Men's canoe sprint

World Championships
Bronze medal – third place	2007 Dusiburg	C-4 500 m

Niculae Flocea (born June 5, 1987) is a Romanian sprint canoeist who has competed since 2007. He won a bronze medal in the C-4 500 m event at the 2007 ICF Canoe Sprint World Championships in Duisburg.

Flocea finished fourth in the C-2 1000 m event at the 2008 Summer Olympics in Beijing.
