= Pál Sarudi =

Hungarian canoeist

Medal record

Men's canoe sprint

Representing Hungary

World Championships
Gold medal – first place	2007 Dusiburg	C-4 200 m
Gold medal – first place	2007 Dusiburg	C-4 500 m
Bronze medal – third place	2006 Szeged	C-4 200 m
Bronze medal – third place	2014 Moscow	C-4 1000 m
Bronze medal – third place	2015 Milan	C-4 1000 m

European Championships
Silver medal – second place	2014 Brandenburg	C-4 1000 m

Pál Sarudi (born 10 August 1983 in Szolnok) is a Hungarian sprint canoeist who has competed since 2003.

His first major success came at the 2003 European Marathon Championships in Gdańsk, Poland, where he won the C-2 bronze medal with partner Krisztian Tokar.

Since then he has concentrated on the sprint events. In 2005 he won a C4 1000m bronze medal at the European Under-23 Championships in Plovdiv, Bulgaria. He was also called up to the senior team and competed in the C4 500m at both the European and World Championships, finishing sixth and fifth respectively.

Sarudi won three medals at the ICF Canoe Sprint World Championships with two golds (C-4 200 m: 2007, C-4 500 m: 2007) and one bronze (C-4 200 m: 2006).

Sarudi is a member of the Szolnoki Sportcentrum Nonprofit Kft. Canoe Club and is coached by Attila Erdős.
