= Nicole Reinhardt =

German canoeist (born 1986)

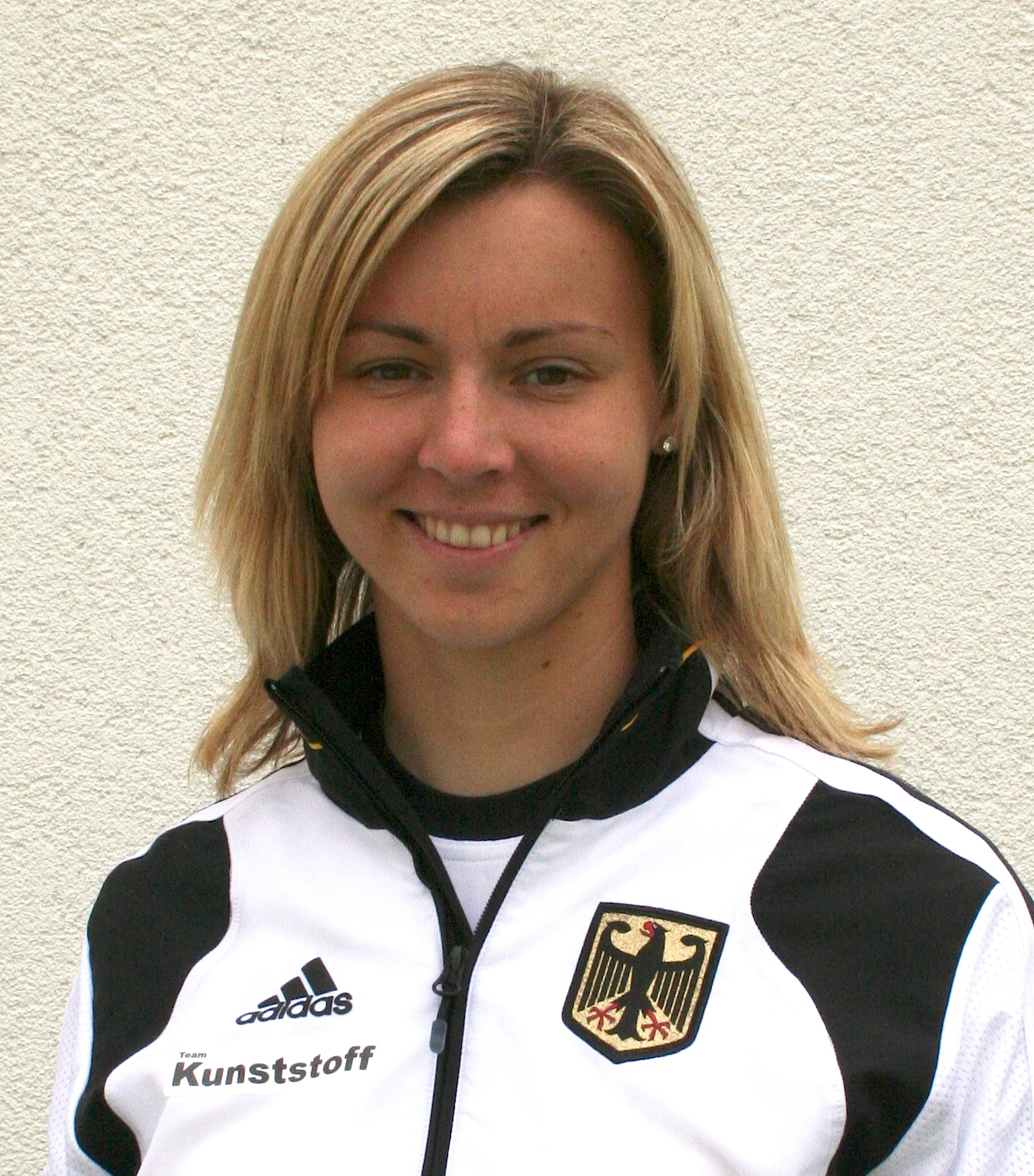
- 2012

Personal information
- Born: 2 January 1986 (age 40) Lampertheim, Hesse, Germany
Medal record
Women's canoe sprint
Representing Germany
Olympic Games
Gold medal – first place	2008 Beijing	K-4 500 m
World Championships
Gold medal – first place	2005 Zagreb	K-1 500 m
Gold medal – first place	2005 Zagreb	K-4 200 m
Gold medal – first place	2007 Duisburg	K-2 200 m
Gold medal – first place	2007 Duisburg	K-2 500 m
Gold medal – first place	2009 Dartmouth	K-1 4 x 200 m
Gold medal – first place	2010 Poznań	K-1 4 x 200 m
Gold medal – first place	2011 Szeged	K-1 500 m
Gold medal – first place	2011 Szeged	K-1 4 x 200 m
Silver medal – second place	2006 Szeged	K-4 200 m
Silver medal – second place	2009 Dartmouth	K-2 200 m
Silver medal – second place	2009 Dartmouth	K-2 500 m
Silver medal – second place	2009 Dartmouth	K-4 500 m
Silver medal – second place	2010 Poznań	K-4 500 m

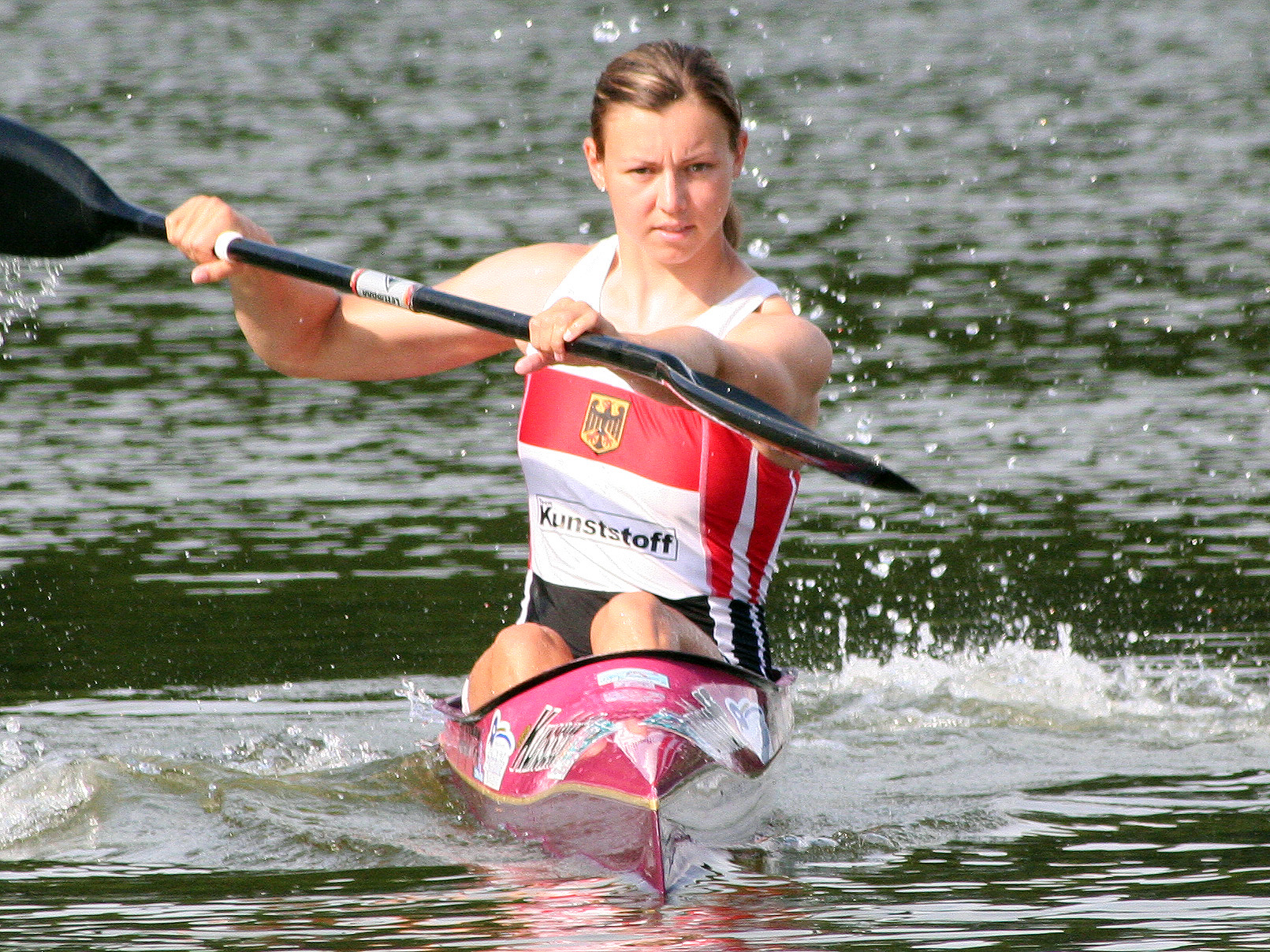
Reinhardt (2010)

Nicole Reinhardt (born 2 January 1986 in Lampertheim, Hesse) is a German canoe sprinter who competed since 2003. She won a gold medal in the K-4 500 m event at the 2008 Summer Olympics in Beijing.

Reinhardt also won thirteen medals at the ICF Canoe Sprint World Championships with eight golds (K-1 500 m: 2005, 2011, K-2 200 m: 2007, K-1 4 × 200 m: 2009, 2010, 2011, K-2 500 m: 2007, K-4 200 m: 2005) and five silvers (K-2 200 m: 2009, K-2 500 m: 2009, K-4 200 m: 2006, K-4 500 m: 2009, 2010).

Reinhardt posed nude in the German edition of Playboy in August 2008, alongside compatriots Katharina Scholz, Petra Niemann and Romy Tarangul.
