= Viktor Kadler =

Hungarian canoeist (born 1981)

Medal record

Men's canoe sprint

World Championships
Gold medal – first place	2005 Zagreb	K-4 200 m
Gold medal – first place	2007 Duisburg	K-4 200 m
Silver medal – second place	2006 Szeged	K-4 200 m

Viktor Kadler (born 11 January 1981 in Győr), is a Hungarian sprint canoer.

He won his first major international title in 2004, becoming European champion as a member of Hungary's victorious four-man (K-4) kayak crew in the 200 m final.

In 2005 the Hungarians did the double, retaining their European title and then winning the World Championship final in Zagreb.

In 2006 they lost their 200 m titles, finishing third at the European Championships at Račice, and second at the World Championships in Szeged. The foursome would win gold at the 2007 world championships.

Kadler is a member of the Győri VSE club.
