= Márton Joób =

Hungarian canoeist (born 1982)

Medal record

Men's canoe sprint

Representing Hungary

World Championships
| Gold medal – first place | 2003 Gainesville | C-4 1000 m |
| Gold medal – first place | 2007 Dusiburg | C-4 200 m |
| Gold medal – first place | 2007 Dusiburg | C-4 500 m |
| Bronze medal – third place | 2006 Szeged | C-4 200 m |

Márton Joób (born 24 June 1982 in Szeged) is a Hungarian sprint canoeist and a politician. He is married to Dóra, and they have 11 children.

== Sports career ==
As an athlete he has competed since 2003. He won four medals at the ICF Canoe Sprint World Championships with three golds (C-4 200 m: 2007, C-4 500 m: 2007, C-4 1000 m: 2003) and one bronze (C-4 200 m: 2006).

Joób also finished seventh in the C-1 500 m event at the 2004 Summer Olympics in Athens.

== Political career ==
He is a politician for the Hungarian Socialist Party. He's been a councilman in the local government of Szeged since 2014.

=== Tax fraud allegations ===
Joób has been detained by the National Tax and Customs Office (NAV) on July 28, 2020, on charges of VAT fraud in the range of hundreds of millions of Forints. His house arrest has been ordered on July 30, 2020.
