= Gábor Horváth (canoeist, born 1985) =

Hungarian canoeist

Medal record

Men's canoe sprint

World Championships
Gold medal – first place	2007 Duisburg	C-4 200 m
Gold medal – first place	2007 Duisburg	C-4 500 m
Silver medal – second place	2009 Dartmouth	C-1 4 x 200 m
Bronze medal – third place	2009 Dartmouth	C-4 200 m

European Championships
Bronze medal – third place	2011 Belgrade	C-2 200 m

Gábor Horváth is a Hungarian sprint canoeist who has competed since 2007. He won four medals at the ICF Canoe Sprint World Championships with two golds (C-4 200 m: 2007, C-4 500: 2007), a silver (C-1 4 × 200 m: 2009), and a bronze (C-4 200 m: 2009).
