= Konstantin Shcharbak =

Belarusian canoeist

Medal record

Men's canoe sprint

World Championships
Gold medal – first place	2006 Szeged	C-4 500 m
Silver medal – second place	2005 Zagreb	C-4 500 m
Silver medal – second place	2006 Szeged	C-4 200 m
Bronze medal – third place	2007 Duisburg	C-4 200 m

Konstantin Shcharbak is a Belarusian sprint canoer who has been competing since 2005. He won four medals at the ICF Canoe Sprint World Championships with a gold (C-4 500 m: 2006), two silvers (C-4 200 m: 2006, C-4 500 m: 2005), and one bronze (C-4 200 m: 2007).
