= Małgorzata Chojnacka (canoeist) =

Polish canoeist (born 1983)

Medal record

Women's canoe sprint

World Championships
Gold medal – first place	2009 Dartmouth	K-2 1000 m
Silver medal – second place	2007 Duisburg	K-2 1000 m
Bronze medal – third place	2007 Duisburg	K-4 500 m

European Championships
Gold medal – first place	2012 Zagreb	K-1 1000 m

Małgorzata Chojnacka (born February 17, 1983, in Gorzów Wielkopolski) is a Polish sprint canoer who has competed since the late 2000s. She won a complete set of medals at the ICF Canoe Sprint World Championships with a gold (K-2 1000 m: 2009), a silver (K-2 1000 m: 2007), and a bronze (K-4 500 m: 2007).

Chojnacka also competed in the K-1 500 m event at the 2008 Summer Olympics in Beijing, but was eliminated in the semifinals.
