= Anne Rikala =

Finnish sprint canoer

Medal record

Women's canoe sprint

Representing Finland

World Championships
| Silver medal – second place | 2007 Duisburg | K-1 200 m |
| Silver medal – second place | 2007 Duisburg | K-1 500 m |
| Bronze medal – third place | 2006 Szeged | K-2 200 m |
| Bronze medal – third place | 2010 Poznań | K-1 5000 m |
| Bronze medal – third place | 2013 Duisburg | K-1 5000 m |

Anne Rikala (born February 20, 1977, in Kangasala) is a Finnish sprint canoer who has competed since 2005. She won four medals at the ICF Canoe Sprint World Championships with two silvers (K-1 200 m and K-1 500 m: both 2007) and two bronzes (K-1 5000 m: 2010, K-2 200 m: 2006).

Rikala also competed at the 2008 Summer Olympics in Beijing, finishing seventh in the K-2 500 m event while being eliminated in the semifinals of the K-1 500 m event. At the 2012 Summer Olympics, she competed in the K-1 500 m again, finishing in eighth.
