= Marina Schuck =

German canoeist

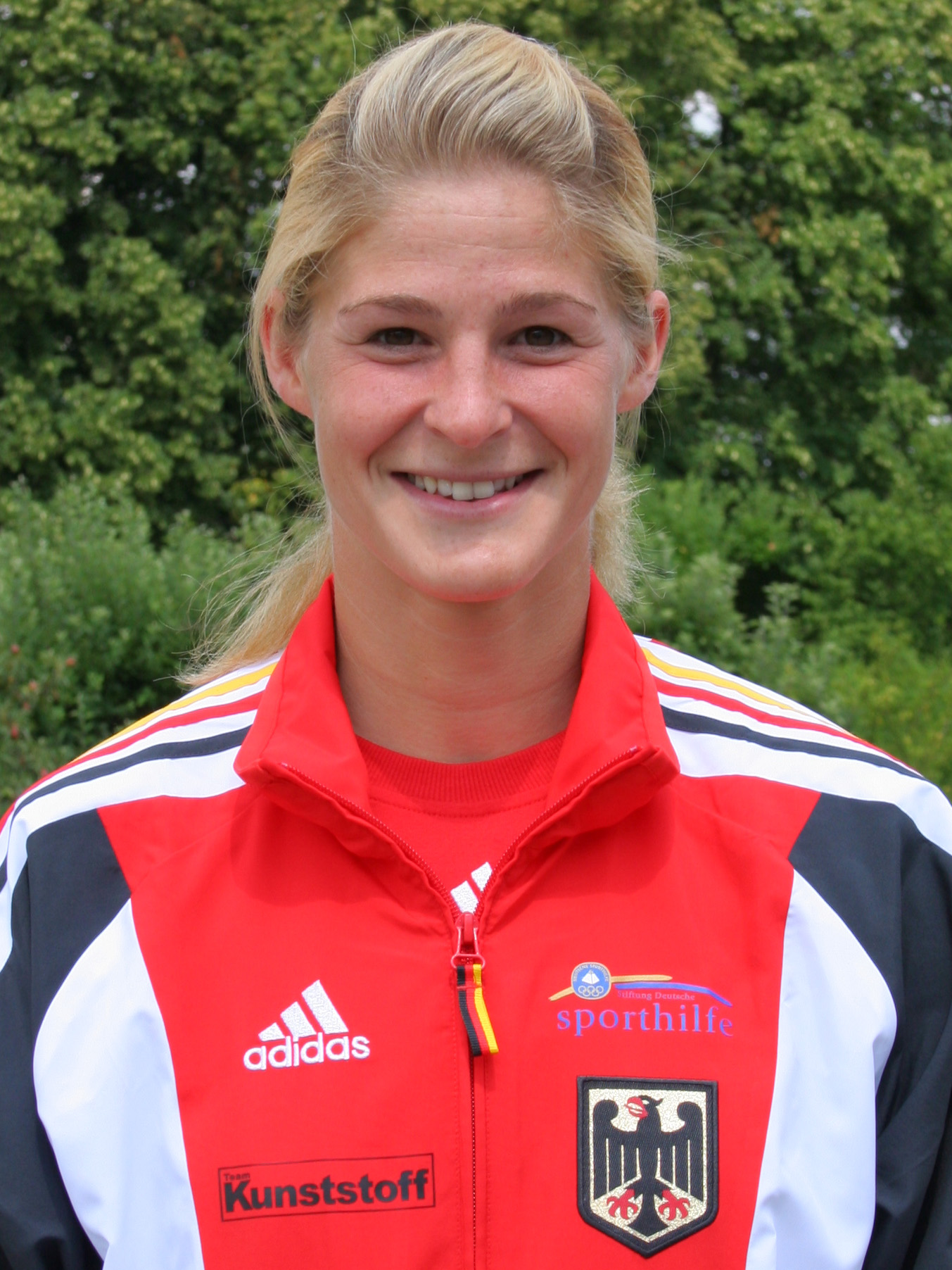

Medal record

Women's canoe sprint

World Championships
Bronze medal – third place	2007 Duisburg	K-4 1000 m

Marina Schuck is a German sprint canoer who has competed since the late 2000s. She won a bronze medal in the K-4 1000 m event at the 2007 ICF Canoe Sprint World Championships in Duisburg.
