= Conny Waßmuth =

German canoeist (born 1983)

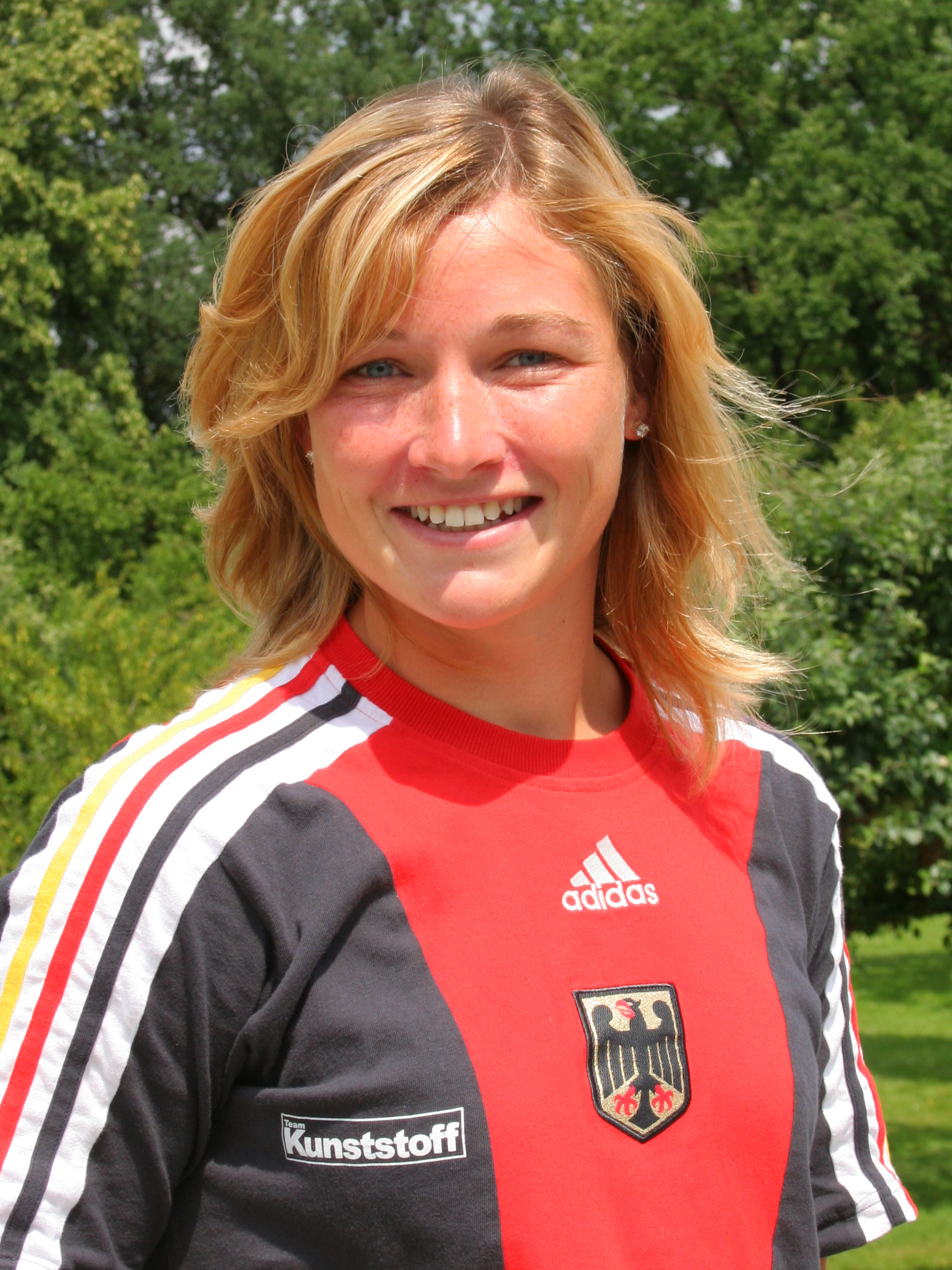
- Waßmuth in 2008

Personal information
- Born: 4 April 1983 (age 43) Halle an der Saale, East Germany
- Height: 167 cm (5 ft 6 in)
- Weight: 64 kg (141 lb)
Medal record
Women's canoe sprint
Representing Germany
Olympic Games
Gold medal – first place	2008 Beijing	K-4 500 m
World Championships
Gold medal – first place	2005 Zagreb	K-4 500 m
Gold medal – first place	2007 Dusiburg	K-4 200 m
Gold medal – first place	2007 Duisburg	K-4 500 m
Gold medal – first place	2009 Dartmouth	K-1 4 x 200 m
Gold medal – first place	2009 Dartmouth	K-4 200 m
Gold medal – first place	2010 Poznań	K-1 4 x 200 m
Gold medal – first place	2011 Szeged	K-1 4 x 200 m
Silver medal – second place	2006 Szeged	K-4 200 m
Silver medal – second place	2006 Szeged	K-4 500 m
Silver medal – second place	2013 Duisburg	K-2 1000 m
Bronze medal – third place	2015 Milan	K-4 500 m
European Championships
Silver medal – second place	2013 Montemor-o-Velho	K-2 1000 m

Conny Waßmuth (also spelled Wassmuth; born 4 April 1983 in Halle an der Saale) is a German sprint canoer who has competed since 2005. She won a gold medal in the K-4 500 m event at the 2008 Summer Olympics in Beijing.

Waßmuth also won eight medals at the ICF Canoe Sprint World Championships with five golds (K-1 4 x 200 m: 2009, 2010; K-4 200 m: 2007, 2009; K-4 500 m: 2005, 2007) and two silvers (K-4 200 m and K-4 500 m: both 2006).

In June 2015, she competed in the inaugural European Games, for Germany in canoe sprint, more specifically, Women's K-4 500m with Verena Hantl, Franziska Weber, and Tina Dietze. She earned a silver medal.

At the 2016 Summer Olympics, she competed in the women's K-1 200 metres event. She was eliminated in the semifinals.
