= Carolin Leonhardt =

German sprint canoeist (born 1984)

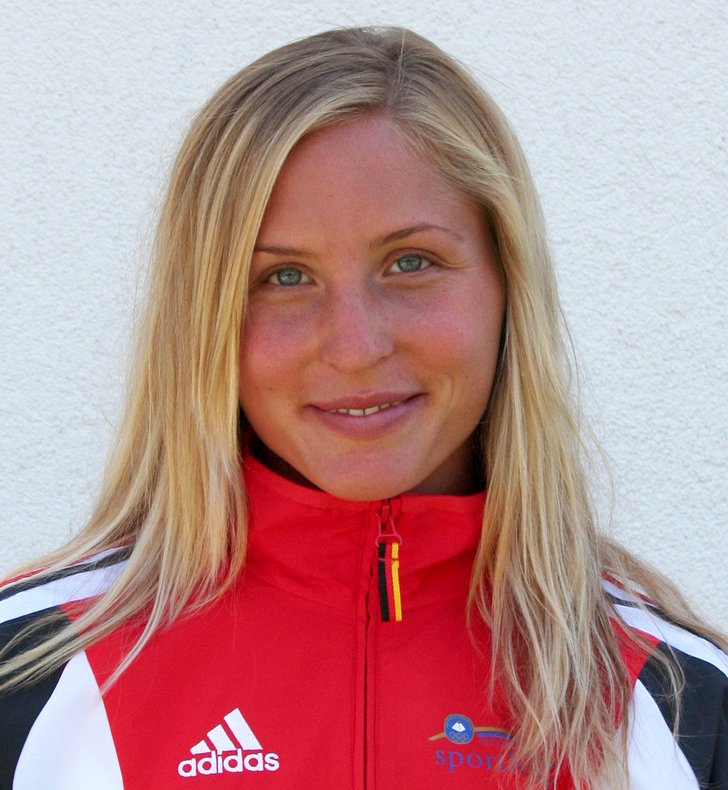

Medal record

Women's canoe sprint

Representing Germany

Olympic Games
| Gold medal – first place | 2004 Athens | K-4 500 m |
| Silver medal – second place | 2004 Athens | K-2 500 m |
| Silver medal – second place | 2012 London | K-4 500 m |

World Championships
| Gold medal – first place | 2005 Zagreb | K-4 200 m |
| Gold medal – first place | 2005 Zagreb | K-4 500 m |
| Gold medal – first place | 2007 Duisburg | K-4 200 m |
| Gold medal – first place | 2007 Duisburg | K-4 500 m |
| Gold medal – first place | 2009 Dartmouth | K-4 200 m |
| Gold medal – first place | 2011 Szeged | K-1 4 x 200 m |
| Silver medal – second place | 2006 Szeged | K-4 200 m |
| Silver medal – second place | 2006 Szeged | K-4 500 m |
| Silver medal – second place | 2006 Szeged | K-4 1000 m |
| Silver medal – second place | 2009 Dartmouth | K-2 1000 m |
| Silver medal – second place | 2009 Dartmouth | K-4 500 m |
| Silver medal – second place | 2010 Poznań | K-2 1000 m |
| Silver medal – second place | 2011 Szeged | K-4 500 m |
| Silver medal – second place | 2013 Duisburg | K-2 1000 m |
| Bronze medal – third place | 2005 Zagreb | K-4 1000 m |

European Championships
| Gold medal – first place | 2012 Zagreb | K-4 500 m |
| Silver medal – second place | 2013 Montemor-o-Velho | K-2 1000 m |
| Bronze medal – third place | 2011 Belgrade | K-4 500 m |

Carolin Martina Leonhardt (born 22 November 1984 in Lampertheim, Hesse) is a German sprint canoer who has competed since the 2000s. She won two medals at the 2004 Summer Olympics in Athens with a gold in the K-4 500 m and a silver in the K-2 500 m events. At the 2012 Summer Olympics, she won a silver in the K-4 500 m.

Leonhardt has also won fifteen medals at the ICF Canoe Sprint World Championships with six golds (K-4 200 m: 2005, 2007, 2009; K-4 500 m: 2005, 2007; K-1 4 × 200 m: 2011), eight silvers (K-2 1000 m: 2009, 2010, 2013; K-4 200 m 2006, K-4 500 m: 2006, 2009, 2011; K-4 1000 m: 2006), and a bronze (K-4 1000 m: 2005).
