= Melinda Patyi =

Hungarian canoeist

Medal record

Women's canoe sprint

World Championships
Gold medal – first place	2003 Gainesville	K-2 200 m
Gold medal – first place	2006 Szeged	K-4 200 m
Silver medal – second place	2007 Duisburg	K-4 200 m

Melinda Patyi is a Hungarian sprint canoer who has competed since the early 2000s. She won three medals at the ICF Canoe Sprint World Championships with a two golds (K-2 200 m: 2003, K-4 200 m: 2006) and a silver (K-4 200 m: 2007).
