= Dzmitry Vaitsishkin =

Belarusian canoeist

Medal record

Men's canoe sprint

Representing Belarus

World Championships
Gold medal – first place	2006 Szeged	C-4 500 m
Gold medal – first place	2009 Dartmouth	C-4 200 m
Gold medal – first place	2009 Dartmouth	C-4 1000 m
Gold medal – first place	2010 Poznań	C-4 1000 m
Gold medal – first place	2011 Szeged	C-4 1000 m
Silver medal – second place	2005 Zagreb	C-4 500 m
Silver medal – second place	2006 Szeged	C-4 200 m
Silver medal – second place	2013 Duisburg	C-4 1000 m
Silver medal – second place	2014 Moscow	C-4 1000 m
Bronze medal – third place	2007 Duisburg	C-4 200 m

European Championships
Gold medal – first place	2012 Zagreb	C-4 1000 m
Gold medal – first place	2013 Montemor-o-Velho	C-4 1000 m
Gold medal – first place	2014 Brandenburg	C-4 1000 m

Dzmitry Vaitsishkin (born 1985) is a Belarusian sprint canoeist who has been competing since 2005. He won seven medals at the ICF Canoe Sprint World Championships with four golds (C-4 200 m: 2009, C-4 500 m: 2006, C-4 1000 m: 2009, 2010), two silvers (C-4 200 m: 2006, C-4 500 m: 2005), and one bronze (C-4 200 m: 2007).
