= Péter Balázs (canoeist) =

Hungarian canoeist

Medal record

Men's canoe sprint

World Championships
Gold medal – first place	2007 Dusiburg	C-4 200 m
Gold medal – first place	2007 Dusiburg	C-4 500 m
Bronze medal – third place	2006 Szeged	C-4 200 m

Péter Balázs is a Hungarian sprint canoeist who has competed since 2006. He won three medals at the ICF Canoe Sprint World Championships with two golds (C-4 200 m: 2007, C-4 500 m: 2007) and one bronze (C-4 200 m: 2006).
