= Gábor Kucsera (canoeist) =

Hungarian canoeist

Medal record

Men's canoe sprint

Representing Hungary

World Championships
| Gold medal – first place | 2005 Zagreb | K-2 1000 m |
| Gold medal – first place | 2006 Szeged | K-2 1000 m |
| Silver medal – second place | 2009 Dartmouth | K-2 500 m |
| Bronze medal – third place | 2006 Szeged | K-2 500 m |
| Bronze medal – third place | 2007 Duisburg | K-2 500 m |
| Bronze medal – third place | 2007 Duisburg | K-2 1000 m |

Gábor Kucsera (born 27 August 1982 in Budapest) is a Hungarian sprint canoeist who has competed since 2005. He won six medals at the ICF Canoe Sprint World Championships with two golds (K-2 1000 m: 2005, 2006), a silver (K-2 500 m: 2009), and three bronzes (K-2 500 m: 2006, 2007; K-2 1000 m: 2007).

Kucsera also competed at the 2008 Summer Olympics in Beijing, finishing fourth in both the K-2 500 m and K-2 1000 m events.

He is a member of the Honvéd-Domino in Budapest.

In July 2015 he was accused of failing a drug test, with cocaine found in his blood. He was suspended by the Hungarian Canoe Association.
