= Andrei Cuculici =

Romanian sprint canoer

Personal information
- Born: 13 December 1983 (age 42) Babadag, Romania

Sport
- Country: Romania
- Sport: Canoe racing
Medal record
Men's canoe sprint
World Championships
Gold medal – first place	2007 Duisburg	C-4 1000 m
Silver medal – second place	2007 Duisburg	C-2 500 m
Bronze medal – third place	2009 Dartmouth	C-4 1000 m

Andrei Cuculici (sometimes listed as Andrej Cuculici, born 13 December 1983) is a Romanian sprint canoeist.

== Career and medals ==
Andrei has competed since 2007. He won a complete set of medals at the ICF Canoe Sprint World Championships with a gold (C-4 1000 m: 2007), a silver (C-2 500 m: 2007), and a bronze (C-4 1000 m: 2009).

Cuculici finished sixth in the C-2 500 m event at the 2008 Summer Olympics in Beijing.
