= Yevgeny Ignatov (canoeist) =

Russian sprint canoeist (born 1979)

Medal record

Men's canoe sprint

World Championships
| Gold medal – first place | 2005 Zagreb | C-2 200 m |
| Gold medal – first place | 2006 Szeged | C-2 200 m |
| Gold medal – first place | 2007 Duisburg | C-2 200 m |
| Gold medal – first place | 2009 Dartmouth | C-1 4 x 200 m |
| Gold medal – first place | 2010 Poznań | C-1 4 x 200 m |
| Gold medal – first place | 2011 Szeged | C-1 4 x 200 m |
| Silver medal – second place | 2007 Dusiburg | C-4 200 m |
| Silver medal – second place | 2009 Dartmouth | C-2 200 m |
| Silver medal – second place | 2009 Dartmouth | C-2 500 m |
| Silver medal – second place | 2010 Poznań | C-2 200 m |

Evgeny Ignatov (sometimes listed as Yevgeniy Ignatov, born November 3, 1979) is a Russian sprint canoeist who has competed since 2004. He won nine medals at the ICF Canoe Sprint World Championships with five golds (C-2 200 m: 2005, 2006, 2007; C-1 4 × 200 m: 2009, 2010) and three silvers (C-2 200 m: 2009, 2010; C-2 500 m: 2009, C-4 200 m: 2007).
