= Philippe Colin =

French sprint canoer

Medal record

Men's canoe sprint

World Championships
Gold medal – first place	2007 Duisburg	K-2 1000 m
Gold medal – first place	2010 Poznań	K-4 1000 m
Silver medal – second place	2009 Dartmouth	K-4 1000 m

Philippe Colin (born 14 September 1979) is a French canoe sprinter who has competed since the late 2000s. He won three medals at the ICF Canoe Sprint World Championships with two golds (K-2 1000 m: 2007, K-4 1000 m: 2010) and a silver (K-4 1000 m: 2009).

Colin also finished sixth in the K-2 1000 m event at the 2008 Summer Olympics in Beijing.

== Bibliography ==
- Canoe09.ca profile
- Kamber, Raymond, ed. (2008). "Medal Winners – Olympic Games and World Championships (1936–2007)" (PDF). CanoeICF.com. International Canoe Federation. pp. 1–83. Archived (PDF) from the original on 18 May 2018.
- Philippe Colin at Olympics at Sports-Reference.com (archived)
