= 2009 Canoe Sprint European Championships =

International canoeing and kayaking event

The 2009 Canoe Sprint European Championships were held in Brandenburg, Germany.

== Medal overview ==
=== Men ===
Event	Gold	Time	Silver	Time	Bronze	Time
C1-200m	(Azerbaijan) Valentyn Demyanenko	39.308	(Russia) Ivan Shtyl	40.014	(Lithuania) Jevgenij Shuklin	40.338
C2-200m	(Lithuania); Tomas Gadeikis; Raimundas Labuckas	32.251	(Russia); Ivan Shtyl; Evgeny Ignatov	32.370	(Germany); Stefan Holtz; Robert Nuck	32.663
C4-200m	(Russia); Nikolai Lipkin; Viktor Melantyev; Alexander Kostoglod; Sergey Ulegin	33.477	(Hungary); Attila Bozsik; Pál Sarudi; Péter Balázs; Gábor Horváth	33.758	(Belarus); Aliaksandr Vauchetski; Andrei Bahdanovich; Dzmitry Vaitsishkin; Dzmitry Rabchanka	33.797
K1-200m	(Ukraine) Oleg Kharitonov	35.308	(Germany) Jonas Ems	35.511	(Czech Republic) Filip Svab	35.534
K2-200m	(Spain); Saúl Craviotto Rivero; Carlos Pérez Rial	32.251	(Belarus); Vadzim Makhneu; Raman Piatrushenka	32.370	(Ukraine); Sergiy Servulya; Mykola Kremer	32.663
K4-200m	(Belarus); Vadzim Makhneu; Taras Valko; Dziamyan Turchyn; Raman Piatrushenka	30.275	(Russia); Stepan Shevchuk; Alexander Dyachenko; Sergey Khovanskiy; Roman Zarubin	30.298	(Hungary); Rudolf Dombi; Gergely Gyertyános; Viktor Kadler; Gergely Boros	30.711
C1-500m	(Belarus) Dzianis Harazha	1:50.298	(Lithuania) Jevgenij Shuklin	1:50.466	(Germany) Sebastian Brendel	1:50.611
C2-500m	(Germany); Robert Nuck; Stefan Holtz	1:40.365	(Poland); Paweł Skowroński; Roman Rynkiewicz	1:41.684	(Azerbaijan); Sergey Bezugliy; Maksym Prokopenko	1:41.876
K1-500m	(Sweden) Anders Gustafsson	1:35.894	(Germany) Ronald Rauhe	1:36.253	(Russia) Anton Ryahov	1:36.868
K2-500m	(Belarus); Raman Piatrushenka; Vadzim Makhneu	1:27.425	(Hungary); Zoltán Kammerer; Gábor Kucsera	1:27.918	(Germany); Marcus Gross; Hendrik Bertz	1:28.006
C1-1000m	(Hungary) Attila Vajda	3:51.934	(Germany) Sebastian Brendel	3:52.854	(Spain) José Luis Bouza	3:55.007
C2-1000m	(Hungary); Mihály Sáfrán; Mátyás Sáfrán	3:34.942	(Germany); Erik Leue; Tomasz Wylenzek	3:36.470	(Russia); Nikolai Lipkin; Viktor Melantyev	3:36.900
C4-1000m	(Germany); Erik Rebstock; Chris Wend; Thomas Lück; Ronald Verch	3:20.283	(Hungary); Viktor Volein; Róbert Mike; Pál Sarudi; Márton Tóth	3:21.356	(Russia); Oleg Shelegov; Ilya Shtokalov; Ivan Kuznetsov; Roman Kruglyakov	3:22.690
K1-1000m	(Germany) Max Hoff	3:29.101	(Sweden) Anders Gustafsson	3:30.419	(Denmark) René Holten Poulsen	3:31.820
K2-1000m	(Norway); Eirik Verås Larsen; Jacob Norenberg	3:12.864	(Hungary); Gábor Gönczy; Roland Kökény	3:13.119	(Germany); Norman Zahm; Sebastian Lindner	3:14.242
K4-1000m	(Belarus); Vadzim Makhneu; Artur Litvinchuk; Aliaksei Abalmasau; Raman Piatrushenka	2:54.589	(Slovakia); Michal Riszdorfer; Erik Vlček; Juraj Tarr; Richard Riszdorfer	2:56.323	(Czech Republic); Ondrej Horsky; Jan Soucek; Jan Sterba; Jan Andrlik	2:56.760
C1-4 × 200 m	(Russia); Evgeny Ignatov; Nikolai Lipkin; Viktor Melantyev; Ivan Shtyl	2:48.130	(Germany); Sebastian Brendel; Chris Wend; Stefan Holtz; Robert Nuck	2:51.096	(Hungary); Attila Vajda; Attila Bozsik; Gábor Horváth; László Foltán Jr.	2:51.254
K1-4 × 200 m	(Denmark); Lasse Nielsen; Casper Nielsen; Esben Østergaard; Kasper Bleibach	2:29.840	(Germany); Torsten Lubisch; Norman Bröckl; Ronald Rauhe; Jonas Ems	2:30.620	(Spain); Francisco Blanco Llera; Borja Prieto Valera; Pablo Andrés; Ekaitz Saies Sistiaga	2:31.290

=== Women ===
Event	Gold	Time	Silver	Time	Bronze	Time
K1-200m	(Spain) Teresa Portela Rivas	41.014	(Hungary) Tímea Paksy	41.090	(Slovenia) Spela Ponomarenko	41.094
K2-200m	(Germany); Nicole Reinhardt; Fanny Fischer	37.019	(Hungary); Nataša Janić; Katalin Kovács	37.131	(Slovakia); Martina Kohlová; Ivana Kmetová	37.561
K4-200m	(Hungary); Nataša Janić; Katalin Kovács; Tímea Paksy; Krisztina Fazekas	35.009	(Germany); Katrin Wagner-Augustin; Tina Dietze; Conny Waßmuth; Carolin Leonhardt	35.065	(United Kingdom); Rachel Cawthorn; Hayleigh Mason; Louisa Sawers; Jessica Walker	35.881
K1-500m	(Hungary) Katalin Kovács	1:49.644	(Germany) Katrin Wagner-Augustin	1:49.862	(United Kingdom) Rachel Cawthorn	1:51.693
K2-500m	(Hungary); Gabriella Szabó; Danuta Kozák	1:39.914	(Slovakia); Martina Kohlová; Ivana Kmetová	1:41.091	(Germany); Franziska Weber; Fanny Fischer	1:41.504
K4-500m	(Germany); Nicole Reinhardt; Katrin Wagner-Augustin; Tina Dietze; Carolin Leonhardt	1:31.236	(Hungary); Erika Medveczky; Nataša Janić; Tamara Csipes; Dalma Benedek	1:33.116	(Poland); Magdalena Krukowska; Małgorzata Chojnacka; Ewelina Wojnarowska; Marta Walczykiewicz	1:33.444
K1-1000m	(Hungary) Katalin Kovács	3:56.310	(Germany) Franziska Weber	3:57.458	(Denmark) Henriette Engel Hansen	3:58.169
K2-1000m	(Sweden); Josefin Nordlöw; Sofia Paldanius	3:35.848	(Hungary); Tamara Csipes; Gabriella Szabó	3:36.533	(Russia); Juliana Salakhova; Anastasia Sergeeva	3:37.111
K1-4 × 200 m	(Germany); Conny Waßmuth; Nicole Reinhardt; Fanny Fischer; Katrin Wagner-Augustin	2:54.351	(Hungary); Danuta Kozák; Tímea Paksy; Nataša Janić; Zomilla Hegyi	2:54.652	(Russia); Natalia Borisova; Alexandra Tomnikova; Svetlana Kudinova; Yulia Kachalova	2:58.062

=== Medal table ===
Rank	Nation	Gold	Silver	Bronze	Total
1	Germany	6	9	5	20
2	Hungary	6	9	2	17
3	Belarus	4	1	1	6
4	Russia	2	3	5	10
5	Sweden	2	1	0	3
6	Spain	2	0	2	4
7	Lithuania	1	1	1	3
8	Denmark	1	0	2	3
9	Azerbaijan	1	0	1	2
9	Ukraine	1	0	1	2
11	Norway	1	0	0	1
12	Slovakia	0	2	1	3
13	Poland	0	1	1	2
14	Czech Republic	0	0	2	2
14	Great Britain	0	0	2	2
16	Slovenia	0	0	1	1
Totals (16 entries)		27	27	27	81
