= 2006 Canoe Sprint European Championships =

International canoeing and kayaking event

The 2006 Canoe Sprint European Championships were held in Račice, Czech Republic.

== Medal overview ==
=== Men ===
Event	Gold	Time	Silver	Time	Bronze	Time
C1-200m	(Russia) Maksim Opalev	38.978	(Czech Republic) Martin Doktor	39.531	(Lithuania) Jevgenij Shuklin	39.543
C2-200m	(Russia); Ivan Shtyl; Evgeny Ignatov	35.859	(Lithuania); Raimundas Labuckas; Tomas Gadeikis	36.503	(Ukraine); Dmitry Sabin; Sergiy Klimniuk	36.775
C4-200m	(Belarus); Dzmitry Vaitsishkin; Dzmitry Rabchanka; Kanstantsin Shcharbak; Aliaksandr Vauchetski	33.241	(Hungary); Gábor Horváth; Pál Sarudi; Márton Joób; Péter Balázs	33.373	(Lithuania); Kazimieras Reksnys; Raimundas Labuckas; Jevgenij Miasniankin; Tomas Gadeikis	33.449
K1-200m	(Germany) Ronald Rauhe	34.515	(Spain) Carlos Pérez Rial	34.644	(Ukraine) Mykola Kremer	35.252
K2-200m	(Germany); Tim Wieskötter; Ronald Rauhe	31.818	(Lithuania); Egidijus Balčiūnas; Alvydas Duonėla	31.958	(Israel); Michael Kolganov; Barak Lufan	31.994
K4-200m	(Belarus); Raman Piatrushenka; Aliaksei Abalmasau; Dziamyan Turchyn; Vadzim Makhneu	29.893	(Czech Republic); Svatopluk Batka; Jan Sterba; Pavel Holubar; Filip Svab	29.989	(Hungary); Viktor Kadler; Gergely Gyertyános; István Beé; Balázs Babella	30.069
C1-500m	(Russia) Maksim Opalev	1:49.935	(Romania) Florin Mironcic	1:51.127	(Ukraine) Yuriy Cheban	1:51.155
C2-500m	(Russia); Sergey Ulegin; Alexander Kostoglod	1:39.626	(Germany); Robert Nuck; Stefan Holtz	1:40.810	(Romania); Josif Chirilă; Andrei Cuculici	1:40.954
C4-500m	(Romania); Loredan Popa; Florin Mironcic; Silviu Simioncencu; Gabriel Talpă	1:30.286	(Belarus); Andrei Bahdanovich; Aliaksandr Bahdanovich; Aliaksandr Zhukouski; Aliaksandr Kurliandchyk	1:31.818	(Hungary); Gábor Furdok; Ferenc Novák; Imre Pulai; Edvin Csabai	1:33.890
K1-500m	(Hungary) Zoltán Benkő	1:38.428	(Russia) Anton Ryahov	1:38.872	(Germany) Lutz Altepost	1:39.988
K2-500m	(Germany); Tim Wieskötter; Ronald Rauhe	1:27.505	(Hungary); Gábor Kucsera; Zoltán Kammerer	1:27.697	(Belarus); Vadzim Makhneu; Raman Piatrushenka	1:28.249
K4-500m	(Slovakia); Róbert Erban; Richard Riszdorfer; Michal Riszdorfer; Erik Vlček	1:20.136	(Romania); Alexandru Ceaușu; Marian Baban; Ștefan Vasile; Alin Anton	1:20.616	(Hungary); Attila Boros; Gábor Bozsik; Attila Csamango; Márton Sík	1:20.664
C1-1000m	(Romania) Florin Mironcic	3:54.600	(Germany) Andreas Dittmer	3:54.844	(Russia) Maksim Opalev	3:55.376
C2-1000m	(Poland); Marcin Grzybowski; Łukasz Woszczyński	3:32.807	(Germany); Christian Gille; Tomasz Wylenzek	3:32.935	(Belarus); Aliaksandr Bahdanovich; Andrei Bahdanovich	3:35.039
C4-1000m	(Germany); Stephan Breuing; Robert Nuck; Stefan Holtz; Thomas Lück	3:14.459	(Belarus); Dzmitry Rabchanka; Dzmitry Vaitsishkin; Aliaksandr Vauchetski; Kanstantsin Shcharbak	3:15.407	(Hungary); Gábor Balázs; Márton Metka; Mátyás Sáfrán; Róbert Mike	3:16.923
K1-1000m	(United Kingdom) Tim Brabants	3:28.586	(Hungary) Zoltán Benkő	3:30.162	(Sweden) Markus Oscarsson	3:30.538
K2-1000m	(Hungary); Gábor Kucsera; Zoltán Kammerer	3:09.703	(Germany); Rupert Wagner; Andreas Ihle	3:10.455	(Spain); Pablo Banos; Javier Hernanz	3:11.955
K4-1000m	(Slovakia); Richard Riszdorfer; Michal Riszdorfer; Erik Vlček; Róbert Erban	2:50.377	(Belarus); Dziamyan Turchyn; Aliaksei Abalmasau; Vadzim Makhneu; Raman Piatrushenka	2:50.437	(Germany); Lutz Altepost; Norman Bröckl; Björn Bach; Björn Goldschmidt	2:50.733

=== Women ===
Event	Gold	Time	Silver	Time	Bronze	Time
K1-200m	(Spain) Teresa Portela Rivas	39.933	(Hungary) Tímea Paksy	40.181	(France) Anne-Laure Viard	40.949
K2-200m	(Hungary); Nataša Janić; Katalin Kovács	36.804	(Germany); Katrin Wagner-Augustin; Fanny Fischer	37.132	(Finland); Anne Rikala; Jenni Honkanen	37.168
K4-200m	(Hungary); Melinda Patyi; Nataša Janić; Katalin Kovács; Tímea Paksy	33.939	(Germany); Gesine Ruge; Carolin Leonhardt; Nicole Reinhardt; Judith Hörmann	34.777	(Sweden); Anna Karlsson; Josefin Nordlöw; Sofia Paldanius; Karin Johansson	35.125
K1-500m	(Hungary) Dalma Benedek	1:52.218	(Poland) Beata Mikołajczyk	1:52.802	(Germany) Nicole Reinhardt	1:52.830
K2-500m	(Hungary); Katalin Kovács; Nataša Janić	1:39.733	(Germany); Fanny Fischer; Katrin Wagner-Augustin	1:41.017	(Italy); Fabiana Sgroi; Alessandra Galiotto	1:41.381
K4-500m	(Hungary); Nataša Janić; Krisztina Fazekas; Tímea Paksy; Katalin Kovács	1:31.458	(Germany); Carolin Leonhardt; Judith Hörmann; Conny Waßmuth; Gesine Ruge	1:32.714	(Romania); Florica Vulpeş; Mariana Ciobanu; Lidia Talpă; Alina Platon	1:34.274
K1-1000m	(Hungary) Dalma Benedek	3:53.155	(Germany) Katrin Wagner-Augustin	3:53.635	(Italy) Josefa Idem	3:56.735
K2-1000m	(Hungary); Nataša Janić; Katalin Kovács	3:36.160	(Germany); Gesine Ruge; Judith Hörmann	3:37.556	(Denmark); Anne Lolk Thomsen; Mette Barfod	3:38.328
K4-1000m	(Hungary); Alexandra Keresztesi; Nataša Janić; Katalin Kovács; Tímea Paksy	3:15.389	(Germany); Tanja Schuck; Carolin Leonhardt; Miriam Frenken; Silke Hormann	3:17.617	(Romania); Florica Vulpeş; Mariana Ciobanu; Lidia Talpă; Alina Platon	3:17.885

=== Medal table ===
Rank	Nation	Gold	Silver	Bronze	Total
1	Hungary	10	4	4	18
2	Germany	4	11	3	18
3	Russia	4	1	1	6
4	Belarus	2	3	2	7
5	Romania	2	2	3	7
6	Slovakia	2	0	0	2
7	Spain	1	1	1	3
8	Poland	1	1	0	2
9	Great Britain	1	0	0	1
10	Lithuania	0	2	2	4
11	Czech Republic	0	2	0	2
12	Ukraine	0	0	3	3
13	Italy	0	0	2	2
13	Sweden	0	0	2	2
15	Denmark	0	0	1	1
15	Finland	0	0	1	1
15	France	0	0	1	1
15	Israel	0	0	1	1
Totals (18 entries)		27	27	27	81
