= 2010 Canoe Sprint European Championships =

International canoeing and kayaking event

The 2010 Canoe Sprint European Championships were held in the Trasona Reservoir, Trasona, Spain.

== Medal overview ==
=== Men ===
Event	Gold	Time	Silver	Time	Bronze	Time
C1-200m	(Lithuania) Jevgenij Shuklin	40.031	(Ukraine) Yuriy Cheban	40.305	(Russia) Ivan Shtyl	40.334
C2-200m	(Lithuania); Tomas Gadeikis; Raimundas Labuckas	35.940	(Russia); Ivan Shtyl; Evgeny Ignatov	36.322	(Belarus); Dzmitry Rabchanka; Aliaksandr Vauchetski	37.096
K1-200m	(United Kingdom) Ed McKeever	35.580	(Germany) Ronald Rauhe	35.747	(Poland) Piotr Siemionowski	36.127
K2-200m	(United Kingdom); Liam Heath; Jonathon Schofield	31.872	(Spain); Saúl Craviotto Rivero; Carlos Pérez Rial	31.910	(Hungary); Rudolf Dombi; István Beé	32.202
C1-500m	(Belarus) Dzianis Harazha	1:48.259	(France) Mathieu Goubel	1:49.876	(Germany) Tomasz Wylenzek	1:50.489
C2-500m	(Romania); Alexandru Dumitrescu; Victor Mihalachi	1:38.642	(Azerbaijan); Sergey Bezugliy; Maksym Prokopenko	1:38.825	(Belarus); Aliaksandr Vauchetski; Dzmitry Rabchanka	1:39.017
K1-500m	(Hungary) Tamás Szalai	1:38.072	(Sweden) Anders Gustafsson	1:38.881	(Germany) Max Hoff	1:39.062
K2-500m	(Belarus); Vadzim Makhneu; Raman Piatrushenka	1:28.818	(Spain); Saúl Craviotto Rivero; Carlos Pérez Rial	1:29.258	(Portugal); Fernando Pimenta; Emanuel Silva	1:29.658
C1-1000m	(Germany) Sebastian Brendel	3:59.106	(France) Mathieu Goubel	3:59.996	(Hungary) Pál Sarudi	4:00.786
C2-1000m	(Azerbaijan); Maksym Prokopenko; Sergey Bezugliy	3:34.115	(Russia); Alexey Korovashkov; Ilya Pervukhin	3:34.745	(Romania); Victor Mihalachi; Alexandru Dumitrescu	3.34.930
C4-1000m	(Russia); Pavel Petrov; Kirill Shamshurin; Alexander Kostoglod; Maksim Opalev	3:17.363	(Belarus); Dzmitry Vaitsishkin; Dzmitry Rabchanka; Dzianis Harazha; Aliaksandr Vauchetski	3:18.438	(Germany); Tomasz Wylenzek; Chris Wend; Erik Rebstock; Ronald Verch	3:19.084
K1-1000m	(Germany) Max Hoff	3:33.018	(Belarus) Aleh Yurenia	3:34.148	(Denmark) René Holten Poulsen	3:35.228
K2-1000m	(Germany); Andreas Ihle; Martin Hollstein	3:11.283	(Hungary); Zoltán Kammerer; Ákos Vereckei	3:12.198	(Spain); Diego Cosgaya Noriega; Emilio Merchán Alonso	3:13.843
K4-1000m	(Germany); Norman Bröckl; Marcus Gross; Tim Wieskötter; Hendrik Bertz	2:54.016	(Hungary); Tamás Szalai; Rudolf Dombi; Gergely Hadvina; Roland Kökény	2:54.961	(Czech Republic); Ondrej Horsky; Jan Soucek; Daniel Havel; Jan Sterba	2:55.316
C1-5000m	(Germany) Ronald Verch	23:10.386	(Spain) José Luis Bouza	23:18.546	(Slovakia) Marian Ostrcil	23:20.018
K1-5000m	(Belarus) Aleh Yurenia	19:55.607	(Germany) Max Hoff	19:58.904	(Russia) Ilya Medvedev	20:16.564

=== Women ===
Event	Gold	Time	Silver	Time	Bronze	Time
K1-200m	(Hungary) Nataša Janić	40.405	(Poland) Marta Walczykiewicz	40.505	(Spain) Teresa Portela Rivas	40.591
K2-200m	(Hungary); Nataša Janić; Katalin Kovács	37.668	(Slovakia); Ivana Kmetová; Martina Kohlová	38.059	(Germany); Fanny Fischer; Carolin Leonhardt	38.090
K1-500m	(Hungary) Danuta Kozák	1:49.010	(Germany) Katrin Wagner-Augustin	1:49.250	(United Kingdom) Rachel Cawthorn	1.49.564
K2-500m	(Hungary); Katalin Kovács; Nataša Janić	1:39.627	(Russia); Anastasia Sergeeva; Juliana Salakhova	1:40.190	(Poland); Ewelina Wojnarowska; Marta Walczykiewicz	1:41.678
K4-500m	(Germany); Nicole Reinhardt; Katrin Wagner-Augustin; Tina Dietze; Fanny Fischer	1:30.719	(Hungary); Gabriella Szabó; Dalma Benedek; Tamara Csipes; Danuta Kozák	1:30.805	(Spain); Teresa Portela Rivas; Jana Smidakova; Beatriz Manchón; Sonia Molanes Costa	1:32.914
K1-1000m	(United Kingdom) Rachel Cawthorn	3:58.346	(Germany) Franziska Weber	4:00.806	(Poland) Beata Mikołajczyk	4:01.276
K2-1000m	(Hungary); Gabriella Szabó; Tamara Csipes	3:34.659	(Russia); Anastasia Sergeeva; Juliana Salakhova	3:36.254	(Germany); Carolin Leonhardt; Tina Dietze	3:38.769
K1-5000m	(United Kingdom) Lani Belcher	22:22.457	(Hungary) Tamara Csipes	22:29.359	(Belarus) Maryna Paltaran	22:33.297

=== Handikayak (Para Canoe) ===
Event	Or	Temps	Argent	Temps	Bronze	Temps
K-1 Homme 200 m LTA-TA	Romania; Iulian Serban (LTA)	43.776	Austria; Mendy Markus Swoboda (TA)	44.316	Spain; Garcia Jonas (LTA)	50.504

=== Medal table ===
Rank	Nation	Gold	Silver	Bronze	Total
1	Germany	6	4	5	15
2	Hungary	6	4	2	12
3	Great Britain	4	0	1	5
4	Belarus	3	2	3	8
5	Lithuania	2	0	0	2
6	Russia	1	4	2	7
7	Azerbaijan	1	1	0	2
8	Romania	1	0	1	2
9	Spain	0	3	3	6
10	France	0	2	0	2
11	Poland	0	1	3	4
12	Slovakia	0	1	1	2
13	Sweden	0	1	0	1
13	Ukraine	0	1	0	1
15	Czech Republic	0	0	1	1
15	Denmark	0	0	1	1
15	Portugal	0	0	1	1
Totals (17 entries)		24	24	24	72
