= Maksym Prokopenko =

Ukrainian-born Azerbaijani sprint canoer (born 1984)

Medal record

Men's canoe sprint

World Championships

Representing Ukraine
Bronze medal – third place	2006 Szeged	C-2 1000 m

Representing Azerbaijan
Silver medal – second place	2009 Dartmouth	C-2 1000 m
Silver medal – second place	2010 Poznań	C-2 500 m
Silver medal – second place	2011 Szeged	C-2 500 m
Silver medal – second place	2011 Szeged	C-2 1000 m
Silver medal – second place	2011 Szeged	C-1 4 x 200 m
Bronze medal – third place	2009 Dartmouth	C-2 500 m

European Championships

Representing Ukraine
Silver medal – second place	2008 Milan	C-2 1000 m

Representing Azerbaijan
Gold medal – first place	2010 Trasona	C-2 1000 m
Silver medal – second place	2010 Trasona	C-2 500 m
Silver medal – second place	2011 Belgrade	C-2 500 m
Bronze medal – third place	2009 Brandenburg	C-2 500 m

Maksym Serhiyovych Prokopenko (Максим Сергійович Прокопенко; born March 23, 1984, in Vilshanka, Kirovohrad Oblast) is a Ukrainian-born Azerbaijani sprint canoeist who has competed since 2002.

Competing for Ukraine, Prokopenko was the Canadian canoe C-1 500 m silver medallist at the 2002 Junior European Championships in Zagreb. He won a bronze medal in the C-2 1000 m event at the 2006 ICF Canoe Sprint World Championships in Szeged.

He also competed in two Summer Olympics for Ukraine, earning his best finish of eighth in the C-2 500 m event at Beijing in 2008.

Prokopenko moved to Azerbaijan after the 2008 Summer Olympics and won two medals for his new nation at the 2009 ICF Canoe Sprint World Championships in Dartmouth, Nova Scotia, with a silver in the C-2 1000 m and a bronze in the C-2 500 m events. He also won a silver in the C-2 500 m event at the 2010 World Championships.

He and teammate Serhiy Bezuhliy finished fourth for Azerbaijan in the men's C-2 1000 m at the 2012 Summer Olympics.
