= Delyana Dacheva =

Bulgarian sprint canoer

Medal record

Women's canoe sprint

World Championships
Silver medal – second place	2003 Gainesville	K-2 500 m
Bronze medal – third place	2002 Seville	K-2 200 m
Bronze medal – third place	2004 Poznan	K-2 1000 m
Bronze medal – third place	U23 2005 Plovdiv	K-1 500 m

Delyana Dacheva (Bulgarian: Деляна Дачева) (born February 25, 1982) is a Bulgarian sprint canoer who competed in the early to mid-2000s. She won two medals at the ICF Canoe Sprint World Championships with a silver (K-2 500 m: 2003) and a bronze (K-2 200 m: 2002).

Dacheva also finished sixth in the K-2 500 m event at the 2004 Summer Olympics in Athens.

In the period 2008 - 2009 Dacheva was invited to become a coach of the USA women's kayak national team. She took the team to 2009 ICF Canoe Sprint World Championships competition.

== Personal life ==
Currently Delyana lives with her family in the United States. She has hyphenated her name: Dacheva-Andonov after her husband.
