= 2011 ICF Canoe Sprint World Championships =

International canoe competition

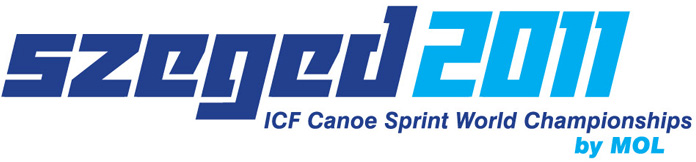
- Host city: Szeged, Hungary
- Motto: "Kayak-canoe, rock & roll"
- Nations: 88
- Events: 37
- Opening: 17 August
- Closing: 21 August
- Dates: August 17–21, 2011
- Main venue: Maty-ér, Szeged
- Website: szeged2011.com

The 2011 ICF Canoe Sprint World Championships was the thirty-ninth edition of the ICF Canoe Sprint World Championships, that took place between 17 and 21 August 2011 in Szeged, Hungary. The Southern Hungarian city welcomed the world event for the third time, having hosted the championship previously in 1998 and 2006. These championships were awarded initially to Vichy, France, however, the race course on the Allier proved to be inadequate to hold the competition and the French Canoe Federation withdraw from organizing the event, following that Szeged, the original host of the 2013 ICF Canoe Sprint World Championships, was moved up to 2011.

Originally 94 nations have indicated their intention to participate on the championship, from them 88 registered officially for the competition, which was the main qualification event for the 2012 Summer Olympics, since 176 of the 248 Olympic quotas were distributed in this fixture.

Germany and Russia topped the overall medal count with 11 medals each, and the Central European country won also the tied-most gold medals together with Hungary. The joy of the Germans was only overshadowed by an anthem mishap, as for their first gold medalists, Anne Knorr and Debora Niche the first verse of the national hymn was played, which is associated with the crimes of the Nazis and is not used since 1952. The organizers asked to be excused, which the head of the German Canoe Federation accepted, assuming no intent. Azerbaijani trio Sergiy Bezugliy, Maksim Prokopenko and Valentin Demyanenko collected three medals each in the men's events, while Max Hoff of Germany became the winningest canoeist with two World Championships titles. In the women's competition Hungary's Danuta Kozák was the most successful racer with two gold and a silver medal. Kozák's partner in K-2, Katalin Kovács claimed her thirty-ninth and fortieth World Championship medal and surpassed Birgit Fischer's record of 38.

== Venue ==
The races were held in the Maty-ér, also known as the National Kayak-Canoe and Rowing Olympic Centre, an artificial reservoir which is situated two kilometres south of Szeged. It consist a 2400 metres long and 122 metres wide race track with nine lanes and a warm-up course, and is equipped with an automatic starting system and an electric time keeper with photo finish camera to meet all the criteria of the International Canoe Federation.

In preparation for the championship, the facilities of the Maty-ér were upgraded to become a state of the art sports complex. The Hungarian government allocated 450 million HUF (approximately $2.4 million) for the procedure, in which the whole sports center became accessible for disabled people, what was an important factor, since paracanoeists also participate in the competition. There was also constructed an 11,000-seat tribune, and the VIP-building together with the finish tower was also redeveloped. New racks were installed as well to be able to store the increased number of boats, and new catamarans were put into operation to assist the smooth conduct of the competition. Moreover, LED displays were erected on the island that divides the race course and the warm-up area, and two 36-meter-high cranes were set up, which hold and move the spidercams above the water. The complete refurbishment was finished and the facilities were delivered on 9 August 2011, eight days prior to the beginning of the championship.

== Preliminaries to the event ==
=== Host selection ===
In October 2007, on the congress meeting of the International Canoe Federation in Guatemala City the organization rights of the World Championships were given to Vichy, beating the bids of Athens and Szeged. The regatta course in Vichy is on a natural river, which quality is highly influenced by the weather conditions. On the 2010 World Cup events a heavy water flow was experienced on the Allier River making the racing unequal. A number of competitors, including Olympic medalists Josefa Idem and Ken Wallace expressed their concerns and dissatisfaction with the track, following that the International Canoe Federation had to reconsider its decision. In early July, after a deep analysis of the situation, being aware of the possible inequity and unfairness on a major Olympic qualification event, the French Canoe Federation with the consent of the International Canoe Federation desisted from organizing the event. On 25 July 2010 the executive committee of the International Canoe Federation awarded the vacant place in its meeting in Lausanne to Szeged, which came second behind Vichy in the official candidating process, and was originally scheduled to host of the 2013 ICF Canoe Sprint World Championships.

=== Sponsorships ===
The naming sponsor of the event is the petrolchemical concern MOL Group, which has actively supported sports in Hungary for years, having a prominent role in ice hockey, fencing, tennis and canoeing. MOL was the main sponsor of the 2006 ICF World Championships and for years it has been the naming sponsor of the MOL World Cup, which is one of the most acknowledged regattas in the world. The official supplier of the championship is SEAT, while Magyar Telekom enters the sponsors' list as the exclusive telecommunications partner. They are present in the competition with a wide range of services, such as LAN, WLAN, 3G and IPTV, providing internet terminals for the usage. Allee Center hosts the related official events, press conferences and promotional programs. Among the media partners are a number of online and offline newspapers (Délmagyarország, Figyelő, Index.hu, IPM, Nemzeti Sport, Szabad Föld) as well as radio stations, including regional transmitter Rádió 88 and nationwide broadcasters Rádió 1 and mr1-Kossuth Rádió. Other sponsors are EDF DÉMÁSZ, ESMA Group, Hunguest Hotels, MKB Bank, Rauch, RiverRide, Theodora, Volán and Weltauto.

== Coverage ==
The media coverage was directed by the Hungarian Television and was taken over by 80 broadcasters, including ARD, rbb, BBC, RAI and global sports channel Eurosport. Live streaming on the official website of the event was also available. The World Championships were the first ever canoeing event, where the spidercam was used, giving a three-dimensional view of the course and making the races more lively for television viewers. 420 accredited press members were present throughout the competition, among others from Associated Press (AP), Agence France-Presse (AFP), Reuters and Deutsche Presse-Agentur (DPA). The event organizers also had a pioneer role in using social media tools such as Facebook, Twitter and blogs to extend the event's reach. Live results were provided by Sportline Ltd and could be reached from the official site of the event. Ovi came out with a free mobile application called Canoe 2011, with that one could be continuously informed about the results and the latest news, both in English and Hungarian.

José Perurena, president of the International Canoe Federation expressed his satisfaction with the coverage on the closing press conference of the event, having emphasized the records that were set in the World Championship: "I'm absolutely content. The finals over the weekend took place in front of a crowd of 15,000 people, and more than 400 correspondents reported from the event, both are record numbers in the history of canoeing." Perurena also highlighted the innovative technologies that debuted on the competition and made the broadcast more enjoyable. His view was shared by Italian Canoe Federation president Luciano Buonfiglio, who stated that "for the member countries of the international federation, Szeged has been a very good occasion, in the best way, to showcase our sport on the international stage. Hungarian television production was really fantastic."

== Explanation of events ==
Canoe sprint competitions are broken up into Canadian canoe (C), an open canoe with a single-blade paddle, or in kayaks (K), a closed canoe with a double-bladed paddle. Each canoe or kayak can hold one person (1), two people (2), or four people (4). For each of the specific canoes or kayaks, such as a K-1 (kayak single), the competition distances can be 200 metres (660 ft), 500 metres (1,600 ft), or 1,000 metres (3,300 ft) long. When a competition is listed as a C-2 500 m event as an example, it means two people are in a canoe competing at a 500 metres (1,600 ft) distance.

Paracanoeist race in the traditional kayak (K) discipline and in va'a (V), which is canoe with an outrigger, that helps the canoeist to poise the boat. The contenders are divided into three classes according to the level of their disability. Participants in LTA category have functional use of their legs, trunk and arms for paddling, and they can apply force to the footboard to propel the boat. TA class paddlers have functional use of the trunk and arms, but they are unable to apply continuous and controlled force to the footboard to propel the boat due to the weakened function of their lower limbs. Canoeist who have no trunk function are classified in the A category. At the World Championships 200 metres single events were organized for both genders in both disciplines in every disability class, however, a minimum of six competing national federations for each category were required in order to be a valid championship.

== Participating nations ==
88 countries have entered athletes.

- Algeria (3)
- Angola (3)
- Argentina (12)
- Armenia (5)
- Australia (29)
- Austria (4)
- Azerbaijan (8)
- Belarus (26)
- Belgium (7)
- Brazil (19)
- Bulgaria (14)
- Cambodia (1)
- Canada (40)
- Chile (6)
- China (24)
- Chinese Taipei (1)
- Colombia (5)
- Cook Islands (2)
- Croatia (2)
- Cuba (9)
- Cyprus (1)
- Czech Republic (21)
- Denmark (9)
- Ecuador (4)
- Egypt (1)
- Estonia (1)
- Finland (6)
- France (18)
- Georgia (2)
- Germany (31)
- Ghana (8)
- Great Britain (23)
- Greece (4)
- Hong Kong (7)
- Hungary (49)
- India (29)
- Indonesia (19)
- Iran (11)
- Iraq (3)
- Ireland (4)
- Israel (2)
- Italy (37)
- Japan (8)
- Kazakhstan (12)
- Kenya (3)
- Kyrgyzstan (6)
- Latvia (14)
- Lithuania (14)
- Luxembourg (3)
- Malaysia (1)
- Malta (2)
- Mexico (12)
- Moldova (5)
- Montenegro (1)
- Morocco (2)
- Myanmar (2)
- Netherlands (5)
- New Zealand (11)
- Norway (7)
- Poland (34)
- Portugal (12)
- Puerto Rico (1)
- Romania (27)
- Russia (44)
- Samoa (1)
- São Tomé and Príncipe (2)
- Senegal (2)
- Serbia (22)
- Seychelles (2)
- Singapore (10)
- Slovakia (18)
- Slovenia (6)
- South Africa (9)
- South Korea (12)
- Spain (41)
- Sri Lanka (1)
- Sweden (21)
- Switzerland (5)
- Tajikistan (1)
- Thailand (1)
- Tunisia (4)
- Turkey (3)
- Ukraine (40)
- United States (28)
- Uruguay (1)
- Uzbekistan (12)
- Venezuela (7)
- Vietnam (2)

== Medal summary ==
=== Men's ===
Non-Olympic classes

==== Canoe ====
Event	Gold		Silver		Bronze	
C–1 200 m	Valentin Demyanenko (AZE)	39.339	Ivan Shtyl (RUS)	39.573	Alfonso Benavides (ESP)	39.687
C–1 500 m	Vladimir Fedosenko (RUS)	1:46.647	Dzianis Harazha (BLR)	1:46.827	Oleksandr Maksymchuk (UKR)	1:47.679
C-1 1000 m	Attila Vajda (HUN)	4:04.749	David Cal (ESP)	4:06.045	Vadim Menkov (UZB)	4:08.151
C–1 5000 m	Mykhaylo Koshman (UKR)	23:23.823	Lukáš Koranda (CZE)	23:24.987	José Luis Bouza (ESP)	23:55.173
C–2 200 m	Lithuania; Raimundas Labuckas; Tomas Gadeikis	37.101	Russia; Viktor Melantyev; Nikolay Lipkin	37.413	Belarus; Dzmitry Rabchanka; Aliaksandr Vauchetski	37.599
C–2 500 m	Romania; Alexandru Dumitrescu; Victor Mihalachi	1:45.524	Azerbaijan; Sergiy Bezugliy; Maksim Prokopenko	1:46.178	Germany; Peter Kretschmer; Kurt Kuschela	1:46.802
C–2 1000 m	Germany; Stefan Holtz; Tomasz Wylenzek	3:42.643	Azerbaijan; Sergiy Bezugliy; Maksim Prokopenko	3:43.525	Romania; Alexandru Dumitrescu; Victor Mihalachi	3:43.837
C–4 1000 m	Belarus; Dzmitry Rabchanka; Dzmitry Vaitsishkin; Dzianis Harazha; Aliaksandr Vauchetski	3:26.703	Romania; Gabriel Gheoca; Catalin Costache; Florin Comănici; Mihail Simon	3:28.071	Hungary; Mátyás Sáfrán; Mihály Sáfrán; Henrik Vasbányai; Szabolcs Németh	3:28.113
C–1 4 × 200 m Relay	Russia; Ivan Shtyl; Evgeny Ignatov; Alexey Korovashkov; Viktor Melantyev	2:46.955	Azerbaijan; Sergiy Bezugliy; Maksim Prokopenko; Valentin Demyanenko; Andriy Kraytor	2:48.341	Germany; Stefan Holtz; Bjoern Waeschke; Stefan Kiraj; Sebastian Brendel	2:48.473

==== Kayak ====
Event	Gold		Silver		Bronze	
K–1 200 m	Piotr Siemionowski (POL)	34.770	Ed McKeever (GBR)	34.986	Ronald Rauhe (GER)	35.118
K–1 500 m	Marek Twardowski (POL)	1:36.688	Pavel Miadzvedzeu (BLR)	1:37.174	Yury Postrigay (RUS)	1:38.404
K–1 1000m	Adam van Koeverden (CAN)	3:36.194	Anders Gustafsson (SWE)	3:39.488	Eirik Verås Larsen (NOR)	3:39.818
K–1 5000 m	Max Hoff (GER)	19:51.200	Aleh Yurenia (BLR)	20:07.952	Maximilian Benassi (ITA)	20:11.936
K-2 200 m	France; Arnaud Hybois; Sébastien Jouve	31.940	Great Britain; Jon Schofield; Liam Heath	32.156	Belarus; Raman Piatrushenka; Vadzim Makhneu	32.390
K–2 500 m	Hungary; Dávid Tóth; Tamás Kulifai	1:28.134	Lithuania; Ričardas Nekriošius; Andrej Olijnik	1:28.524	Poland; Denis Ambroziak; Dawid Putto	1:28.848
K–2 1000 m	Slovakia; Peter Gelle; Erik Vlček	3:20.626	Sweden; Markus Oscarsson; Henrik Nilsson	3:21.478	Russia; Vititaly Yurchenko; Vasily Pogreban	3:21.544
K–4 1000 m	Germany; Norman Bröckl; Robert Gleinert; Max Hoff; Paul Mittelstedt	2:47.734	Australia; Jacob Clear; Murray Stewart; David Smith; Tate Smith	2:48.724	Russia; Ilya Medvedev; Anton Vasilev; Anton Ryakhov; Oleg Zhestkov	2:49.516
K–1 4 × 200 m Relay	Spain; Saúl Craviotto; Ekaitz Saies; Carlos Pérez; Pablo Andrés	2:24.891	Russia; Viktor Zavolskiy; Alexander Dyachenko; Mikhail Tamonov; Evgeny Salakhov	2:25.701	Denmark; Casper Nielsen; Jimmy Bøjesen; Kasper Bleibach; Lasse Nielsen	2:25.821

=== Women's ===
Non-Olympic classes

==== Canoe ====
Event	Gold		Silver		Bronze	
C–1 200 m	Laurence Vincent-Lapointe (CAN)	48.876	Maria Kazakova (RUS)	50.166	Staniliya Stamenova (BUL)	51.192
C–2 500 m	Canada; Laurence Vincent-Lapointe; Mallorie Nicholson	2:01.028	Russia; Anastasia Ganina; Natalia Marasanova	2:03.440	Hungary; Kincső Takács; Gyöngyvér Baravics	2:08.534

==== Kayak ====
Event	Gold		Silver		Bronze	
K–1 200 m	Lisa Carrington (NZL)	39.998	Marta Walczykiewicz (POL)	40.472	Inna Osypenko-Radomska (UKR)	40.670
K–1 500 m	Nicole Reinhardt (GER)	1:47.066	Danuta Kozák (HUN)	1:47.396	Inna Osypenko-Radomska (UKR)	1:48.668
K–1 1000 m	Tamara Csipes (HUN)	4:11.388	Krisztina Fazekas Zur (USA)	4:13.470	Naomi Flood (AUS)	4:14.124
K–1 5000 m	Tamara Csipes (HUN)	22:19.816	Lani Belcher (GBR)	22:26.572	Maryna Paltaran (BLR)	22:37.294
K–2 200 m	Hungary; Katalin Kovács; Danuta Kozák	37.667	Poland; Karolina Naja; Magdalena Krukowska	38.165	Australia; Joanne Brigden-Jones; Hannah Davis	38.369
K–2 500 m	Austria; Yvonne Schuring; Viktoria Schwarz	1:37.071 WB	Germany; Franziska Weber; Tina Dietze	1:37.275	Poland; Beata Mikołajczyk; Aneta Konieczna	1:37.803
K–2 1000 m	Germany; Anne Knorr; Debora Niche	3:50.614	Bulgaria; Berenike Faldum; Daniela Nedeva	3:50.950	Hungary; Alíz Sarudi; Erika Medveczky	3:53.416
K–4 500 m	Hungary; Gabriella Szabó; Danuta Kozák; Katalin Kovács; Dalma Benedek	1:36.339	Germany; Carolin Leonhardt; Silke Hörmann; Franziska Weber; Tina Dietze	1:37.521	Belarus; Iryna Pamialova; Nadzeya Papok; Volha Khudzenka; Maryna Paltaran	1:37.887
K–1 4 × 200 m Relay	Germany; Nicole Reinhardt; Conny Wassmuth; Tina Dietze; Carolin Leonhardt	2:49.541	Russia; Natalia Lobova; Anastasiya Sergeeva; Natalia Proskurina; Svetlana Kudinova	2:50.207	Poland; Marta Walczykiewicz; Karolina Naja; Aneta Konieczna; Ewelina Wojnarowska	2:50.951

=== Paracanoe ===
Event	Gold		Silver		Bronze	
Men's K–1 200 m A	Fernando Fernandes de Padua (BRA)	54.340	Alexey Malyshev (RUS)	1:02.620	Antonio de Diego Álvarez (ESP)	1:05.140
Men's K–1 200 m TA	Markus Swoboda (AUT)	44.055	Tomasz Mozdzierski (POL)	51.087	Bence Pál (HUN)	53.721
Men's K–1 200 m LTA	Iulian Șerban (ROU)	43.294	Andrea Testa (ITA)	45.166	Mateusz Surwilo (POL)	45.898
Men's V–1 200 m TA	Sándor Szabó (HUN)	1:02.958	Robert Balk (USA)	1:02.988	Daniel Hopwood (GBR)	1:08.778
Men's V–1 200 m LTA	Mahoney Patrick (GBR)	57.648	George Thomas (GBR)	58.392	Gerhard Bowitzky (GER)	59.358
Women's K–1 200 m TA	Marta Santos Ferreira (BRA)	1:04.139	Christine Selinger (CAN)	1:06.053	Anna Pani (ITA)	1:08.723
Women's K–1 200 m LTA	Christine Gauthier (CAN)	56.425	Silvia Elvira Lopez (ESP)	1:05.743	Marta Santos Ferreira (BRA)	1:06.571
Women's V–1 200 m LTA	Christine Selinger (CAN)	1:11.882	Brit Gottschalk (GER)	1:13.490	Tami Hetke (USA)	1:14.660

== Medals table ==
=== Canoe ===
Rank	Nation	Gold	Silver	Bronze	Total
1	Germany	6	2	3	11
2	Hungary	6	1	3	10
3	Canada	3	0	0	3
4	Russia	2	6	3	11
5	Poland	2	2	3	7
6	Belarus	1	3	4	8
7	Azerbaijan	1	3	0	4
8	Spain	1	1	2	4
9	Romania	1	1	1	3
10	Lithuania	1	1	0	2
11	Ukraine	1	0	3	4
12	Austria	1	0	0	1
12	France	1	0	0	1
12	New Zealand	1	0	0	1
12	Slovakia	1	0	0	1
16	Great Britain	0	3	0	3
17	Sweden	0	2	0	2
18	Australia	0	1	2	3
19	Bulgaria	0	1	1	2
20	Czech Republic	0	1	0	1
20	United States	0	1	0	1
22	Denmark	0	0	1	1
22	Italy	0	0	1	1
22	Norway	0	0	1	1
22	Uzbekistan	0	0	1	1
Totals (25 entries)		29	29	29	87

=== Paracanoe ===
Rank	Nation	Gold	Silver	Bronze	Total
1	Canada	2	1	0	3
2	Brazil	2	0	1	3
3	Great Britain	1	1	1	3
4	Hungary	1	0	1	2
5	Austria	1	0	0	1
5	Romania	1	0	0	1
7	Germany	0	1	1	2
7	Italy	0	1	1	2
7	Poland	0	1	1	2
7	Spain	0	1	1	2
7	United States	0	1	1	2
12	Russia	0	1	0	1
Totals (12 entries)		8	8	8	24

=== Overall ===
Rank	Nation	Gold	Silver	Bronze	Total
1	Hungary	7	1	4	12
2	Germany	6	3	4	13
3	Canada	5	1	0	6
4	Russia	2	7	3	12
5	Poland	2	3	4	9
6	Romania	2	1	1	4
7	Brazil	2	0	1	3
8	Austria	2	0	0	2
9	Great Britain	1	4	1	6
10	Belarus	1	3	4	8
11	Azerbaijan	1	3	0	4
12	Spain	1	2	3	6
13	Lithuania	1	1	0	2
13	New Zealand	1	1	0	2
15	Ukraine	1	0	3	4
16	France	1	0	0	1
16	Slovakia	1	0	0	1
18	United States	0	2	1	3
19	Sweden	0	2	0	2
20	Australia	0	1	2	3
20	Italy	0	1	2	3
22	Bulgaria	0	1	1	2
23	Czech Republic	0	1	0	1
24	Denmark	0	0	1	1
24	Norway	0	0	1	1
24	Uzbekistan	0	0	1	1
Totals (26 entries)		37	38	37	112
