= László Foltán =

László Foltán may refer to:

- László Foltán, Jr., Hungarian sprint canoer who has competed since the late 2000s
- László Foltán, Sr. (born 1953), Hungarian sprint canoer who competed in the late 1970s and early 1980s
