= Ondřej Horský =

Czech sprint canoer (1977–2026)

Medal record

Men's canoe sprint

World Championships
Bronze medal – third place	2010 Poznań	K-4 1000 m

European Championships
Bronze medal – third place	2009 Brandenburg	K-4 1000 m
Bronze medal – third place	2010 Trasona	K-4 1000 m

Ondřej Horský (5 March 1977 – 18 June 2026) was a Czech sprint canoer who competed in the 2000s. He won the bronze medal in the K-4 1000 m event at the 2010 ICF Canoe Sprint World Championships in Poznań.

He also won bronze in the same event at the 2009 and 2010 Canoe Sprint European Championships.

Horský died on 18 June 2026, at the age of 49.

== Sources ==
- Canoe09.ca profile
