= Zomilla Hegyi =

Hungarian-Spanish sprint canoer (born 1989)

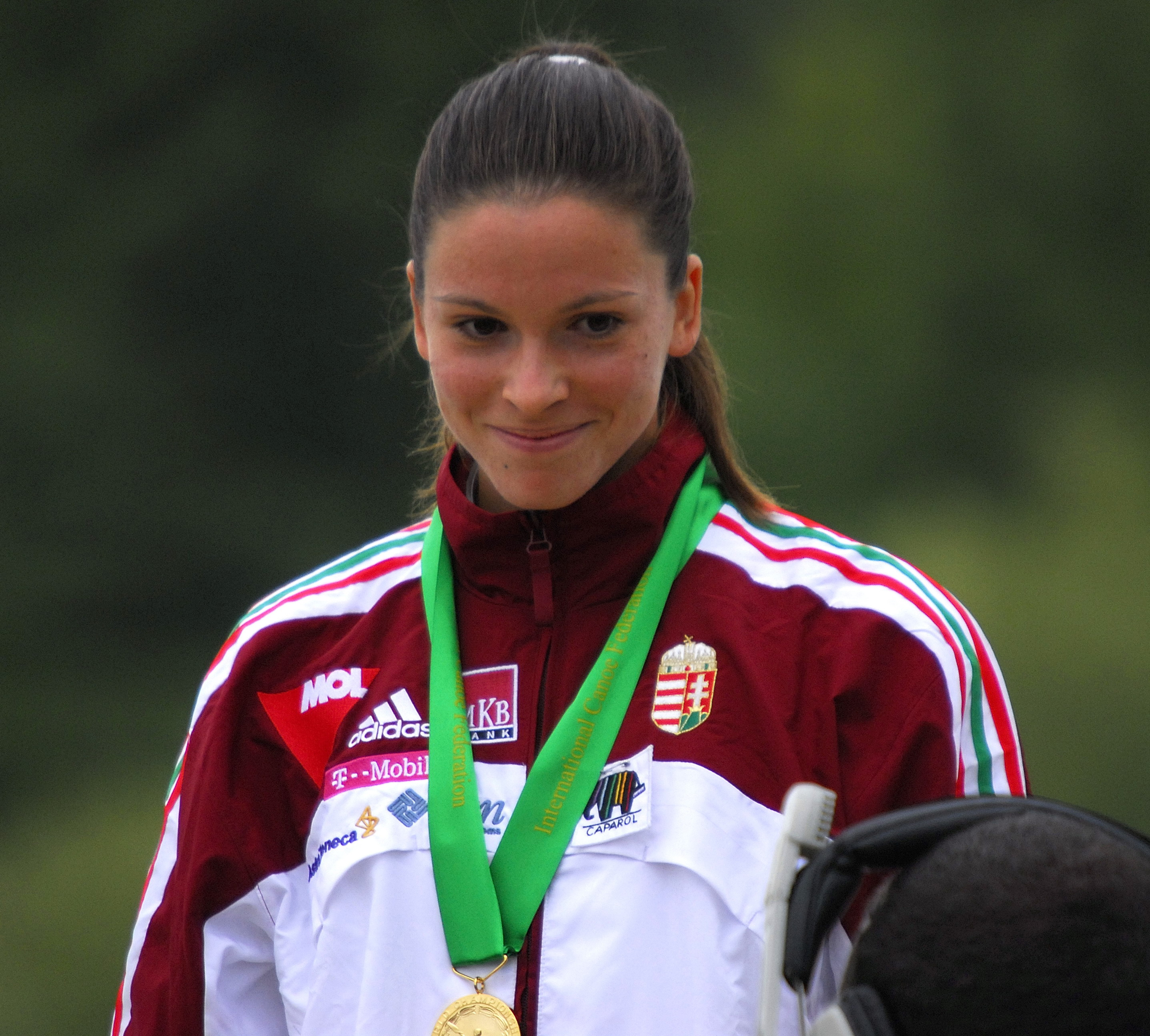

Personal information
- Full name: Zomilla Hegyi
- Nationality: Hungarian
- Born: 31 October 1989 (age 36) Budapest, Hungary
- Height: 1.69 m (5 ft 7 in)
- Weight: 59 kg (130 lb)

Sport
- Country: Hungary
- Sport: Canoeing
- Club: KSI SE
Medal record
Women's canoe sprint
Representing Hungary
World Championships
Silver medal – second place	2009 Dartmouth	K-1 4 x 200 m
Silver medal – second place	2010 Poznań	K-1 4 x 200 m
European Championships
Silver medal – second place	2009 Brandenburg	K-1 4 x 200 m

Zomilla Hegyi (born 31 October 1989 in Budapest) is a Hungarian-Spanish sprint canoeist who has competed since the late 2000s. She won two silver medals in the K-1 4 × 200 m event at the ICF Canoe Sprint World Championships, earning them in 2009 and 2010.
