= Łukasz Woszczyński =

Polish canoeist

Medal record

Men's canoe sprint
Event	1st	2nd	3rd
Olympic Games	0	0	0
World Championships	0	2	0
European Championships	2	2	1
European Games	0	0	0
Total	2	4	1

World Championships
Silver medal – second place	2003 Gainesville	C-4 500 m
Silver medal – second place	2006 Szeged	C-4 500 m

European Championships
Gold medal – first place	2004 Poznań	C2-1000 m
Gold medal – first place	2006 Račice	C2-1000m
Silver medal – second place	2005 Poznań	C2-500 m
Silver medal – second place	2007 Pontevedra	C4-500 m
Bronze medal – third place	2008 Milan	C4-1000 m

Łukasz Woszczyński (born 13 February 1983) is a Polish canoe sprinter who competed in the mid-2000s. He won two silver medals in the C-4 500 m at the ICF Canoe Sprint World Championships, earning them in 2003 and 2006.

Woszczyński also finished fifth in the C-2 1000 m event at the 2004 Summer Olympics in Athens.
