= Jevgenij Shuklin =

Russian-born Lithuanian sprint canoeist (1985–2026)

Medal record

Representing Lithuania

Men's sprint canoeing

Olympic Games
Disqualified	2012 London	C1-200 m

World Championships
Bronze medal – third place	2006 Szeged	C-1 200 m
Bronze medal – third place	2007 Duisburg	C-1 200 m
Bronze medal – third place	2009 Dartmouth	C-1 200 m
Bronze medal – third place	2014 Moscow	C-1 200 m

European Championships
Gold medal – first place	2007 Pontevedra	C-1 200 m
Gold medal – first place	2010 Trasona	C-1 200 m
Gold medal – first place	2013 Montemor-o-Velho	C-1 200 m
Silver medal – second place	2009 Brandenburg	C-1 500 m
Bronze medal – third place	2006 Račice	C-1 200 m
Bronze medal – third place	2009 Brandenburg	C-1 200 m
Bronze medal – third place	2012 Zagreb	C-1 200 m

Universiade
Gold medal – first place	2013 Kazan	C-1 200 m
Gold medal – first place	2013 Kazan	C-1 500 m

Jevgenij Shuklin (Lithuanian: Jevgenijus Šuklinas; 23 November 1985 – 28 May 2026) was a Russian-born Lithuanian sprint canoeist and politician.

== Biography ==
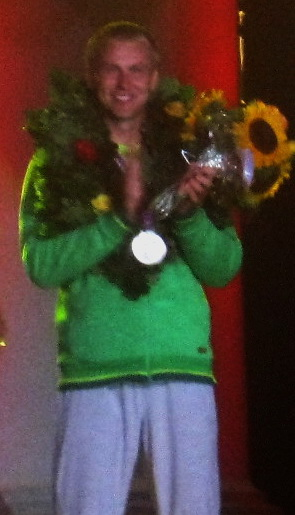
Shuklin at ceremony of the meeting of Lithuanian Olympic Team in Vilnius

=== Background ===
Shuklin was born in Glazov, Russian SFSR on 23 November 1985. He died in Zarasai District Municipality on 28 May 2026, at the age of 40.

=== Sports' career ===
Shullin was world junior champion in 2003 (Japan, Komatsu). He won four bronze medals in the C-1 200 m event at the ICF Canoe Sprint World Championships, earning them in 2006, 2007, 2009, and 2014. He was also a three time European champion, in Pontevedra in 2007, in Trasona in 2010 and in Montemor-o-Velho in 2013.

He initially won a silver medal at the 2012 Summer Olympics, but he was disqualified for doping after reanalysis in 2019 and was stripped of his medal.

=== Political career ===
Between 2014 and 2024 Shuklin was Visaginas council member. On 25 April 2023 Shuklin was elected as temporary intermediate Mayor of Visaginas. From 2024 to 2026 Shuklin was a member of the Seimas, representing the Liberals' Movement.

== Sources ==
- Canoe09.ca profile
