= Natasa Dusev-Janics =

Hungarian canoeist (born 1982)

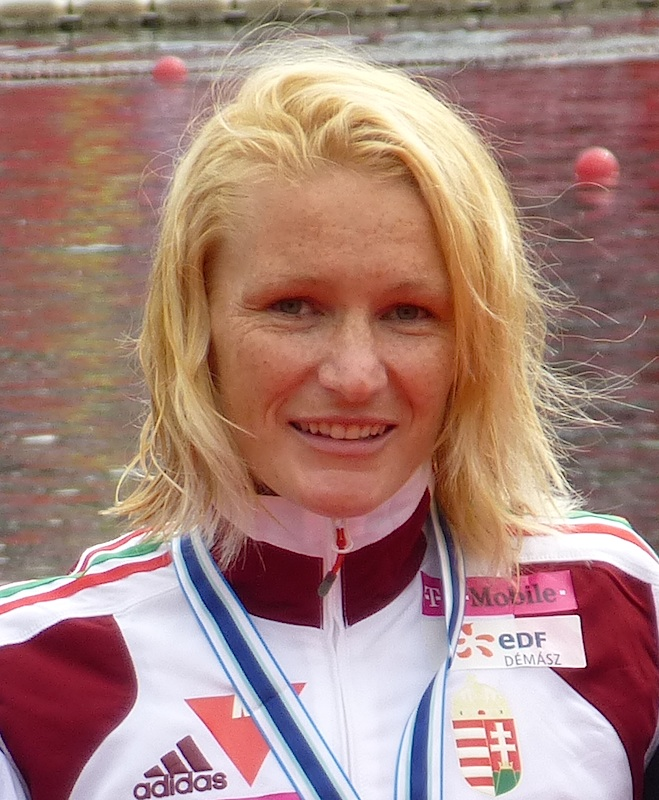
- Natasa Dusev-Janics in 2012

Personal information
- Nationality: Serbian, Hungarian
- Born: Nataša Janić; 24 June 1982 (age 44) Bačka Palanka, SFR Yugoslavia (today in Serbia)

Sport
- Sport: Canoe sprint
- Club: Szegedi VSE (2001–2012); Győri VSE (2013–)
Medal record
Event	1st	2nd	3rd
Olympic Games	3	2	1
World Championships	20	6	9
European Championships	18	4	2
European Games	0	0	0
Total	41	11	12
Olympic Games
Gold medal – first place	2004 Athens	K-1 500 m
Gold medal – first place	2004 Athens	K-2 500 m
Gold medal – first place	2008 Beijing	K-2 500 m
Silver medal – second place	2008 Beijing	K-4 500 m
Silver medal – second place	2012 London	K-2 500 m
Bronze medal – third place	2012 London	K-1 200 m
World Championships
Gold medal – first place	2002 Seville	K-4 200 m
Gold medal – first place	2003 Gainesville	K-4 200 m
Gold medal – first place	2003 Gainesville	K-4 1000 m
Gold medal – first place	2005 Zagreb	K-2 200 m
Gold medal – first place	2005 Zagreb	K-2 500 m
Gold medal – first place	2005 Zagreb	K-2 1000 m
Gold medal – first place	2006 Szeged	K-2 200 m
Gold medal – first place	2006 Szeged	K-2 500 m
Gold medal – first place	2006 Szeged	K-2 1000 m
Gold medal – first place	2006 Szeged	K-4 200 m
Gold medal – first place	2006 Szeged	K-4 500 m
Gold medal – first place	2006 Szeged	K-4 1000 m
Gold medal – first place	2007 Duisburg	K-1 200 m
Gold medal – first place	2009 Dartmouth	K-1 200 m
Gold medal – first place	2009 Dartmouth	K-2 200 m
Gold medal – first place	2009 Dartmouth	K-4 500 m
Gold medal – first place	2010 Poznań	K-1 200 m
Gold medal – first place	2010 Poznań	K-2 200 m
Gold medal – first place	2010 Poznań	K-4 500 m
Gold medal – first place	2013 Duisburg	K–1 200 m Relay
Silver medal – second place	2009 Dartmouth	K-1 4 x 200 m
Silver medal – second place	2009 Dartmouth	K-4 200 m
Silver medal – second place	2010 Poznań	K-1 500 m
Silver medal – second place	2010 Poznań	K-1 4 x 200 m
Silver medal – second place	2013 Duisburg	K-2 500 m
Silver medal – second place	2015 Milan	K-2 200 m
European Championships
Gold medal – first place	2004 Poznań	K-1 500 m
Gold medal – first place	2005 Poznań	K-2 200 m
Gold medal – first place	2005 Poznań	K-2 500 m
Gold medal – first place	2005 Poznań	K-2 1000 m
Gold medal – first place	2006 Račice	K-4 200 m
Gold medal – first place	2006 Račice	K-2 500 m
Gold medal – first place	2006 Račice	K-4 500 m
Gold medal – first place	2006 Račice	K-2 1000 m
Gold medal – first place	2006 Račice	K-4 1000 m
Gold medal – first place	2007 Pontevedra	K-1 200 m
Gold medal – first place	2009 Brandenburg	K-4 200 m
Gold medal – first place	2010 Trasona	K-1 200 m
Gold medal – first place	2010 Trasona	K-2 200 m
Gold medal – first place	2010 Trasona	K-2 500 m
Gold medal – first place	2012 Zagreb	K-1 200 m
Gold medal – first place	2012 Zagreb	K-2 500 m
Gold medal – first place	2013 Montemor-o-Velho	K-2 200 m
Gold medal – first place	2013 Montemor-o-Velho	K-4 500 m
Silver medal – second place	2002 Szeged	K-4 200 m
Silver medal – second place	2009 Brandenburg	K1-4×200 m
Silver medal – second place	2009 Brandenburg	K-2 200 m
Silver medal – second place	2009 Brandenburg	K-4 500 m
Bronze medal – third place	2013 Montemor-o-Velho	K-1 200 m
Bronze medal – third place	2013 Montemor-o-Velho	K-2 500 m

Natasa Dusev-Janics (Serbian: Nataša Dušev-Janić, Serbian Cyrillic: Наташа Душев-Јанић; born 24 June 1982) is a Serbian-Hungarian sprint canoer who has competed for Hungary since 2001 and has won six Olympic medals in the sprint canoe events.

== Early life ==
Natasa grew up in Serbia and competed for FR Yugoslavia at the 2000 Summer Olympics before moving to Hungary. She is a daughter of Milan Janić (1957–2003), a Serbian canoer who won a silver medal for Yugoslavia in the 1984 Olympic Games in Los Angeles. Both her brothers, Mićo and Stjepan Janić, are canoers and have competed for Croatia since 2004. They took part in the 2008 Olympics, though Mićo was only nominated as a reserve.

== Career ==
Janics won two Olympic gold medals in the sprint canoe events at the 2004 Summer Olympics, another gold and silver medal at the 2008 Summer Olympics and silver and bronze at the 2012 Summer Olympics. She has also won 26 medals at the ICF Canoe Sprint World Championships with 20 golds (K-1 200 m: 2007, 2009, 2010; K-2 200 m: 2005, 2006, 2009, 2010; K-2 500 m: 2005, 2006; K-2 1000 m: 2005, 2006; K-4 200 m: 2002, 2003, 2006; K-4 500 m: 2006, 2009, 2010; K-4 1000 m: 2003, 2006; K-1 200 m relay: 2013) and six silvers (K-1 500 m: 2010, K-1 4 × 200 m: 2009, 2010; K-2 200 m: 2015; K-2 500 m: 2013; K-4 200 m: 2009).

She was elected Hungarian Sportswoman of the Year in 2004 and 2010. Together with Katalin Kovács she earned the title Hungarian Sportsteam of the year in 2005, 2006 and 2010.

On 4 October 2012 it was revealed that she made a decision to return and compete under the flag of her native country, Serbia. On 9 March 2013 she informed the Hungarian Canoe Federation in a letter about changing her mind and her wish to compete for Hungary during her professional career.

She's been suffering from a herniated disc in her neck since 2012; in 2019 she has stated that it's reached a point where she is considering retirement.

== Awards ==
- Yugoslav Young Athlete of the Year: 2000
- Hungarian kayaker of the Year (4): 2004, 2005, 2006, 2010
- Hungarian Sportswoman of the Year (2) - votes of sports journalists: 2004, 2010
- Hungarian Athlete of the Year (1) - the National Sports Association (NSSZ) awards: 2004
- Person of the Year by Magyar Szó: 2004
- Member of the Hungarian team of year (with Katalin Kovács): 2005, 2006, 2010
- Príma Primissima award (2006)
- Pro Universitate (2008)

Orders and special awards

- Order of Merit of the Republic of Hungary – Officer's Cross (2004)
- Order of Merit of the Republic of Hungary – Commander's Cross (2008)
- Order of Merit of Hungary – Commander's Cross with Star (2012)

Awards
Preceded by Lazar Lazarević	(Federal Republic of Yugoslavia) The Best Young Athlete of Yugoslavia; 2000	Succeeded by Tomislav Tomović
Preceded by Katalin Kovács; Katinka Hosszú	Hungarian Sportswoman of The Year; 2004; 2010	Succeeded by Zsuzsanna Vörös; Tamara Csipes
