= Gergő Németh =

Hungarian canoeist

Medal record

Men's canoe sprint

World Championships
Bronze medal – third place	2009 Dartmouth	C-4 200 m

Gergő Németh is a Hungarian canoer who has been competing since the late 2000s. He won a bronze medal in the C-4 200 m event at the 2009 ICF Canoe Sprint World Championships in Dartmouth, Nova Scotia.
