= Canoeing at the 2004 Summer Olympics – Women's K-2 500 metres =

These are the results of the women's K-2 500 metres competition in canoeing at the 2004 Summer Olympics. The K-2 event is raced by two-person canoe sprint kayaks.

== Medalists ==
Gold	Silver	Bronze
Katalin Kovács and Nataša Janić (HUN)	Birgit Fischer and Carolin Leonhardt (GER)	Aneta Pastuszka and Beata Sokołowska-Kulesza (POL)

== Heats ==
The 15 teams first raced in two heats. The top three finishers in each heat advanced directly to the final, and the remaining nine teams advanced to the semifinal. No teams were eliminated in the heats. The heats were raced on August 24.

Heat	Place	Athlete	Country	Time	Notes
1	1	Katalin Kovács and Nataša Janić	Hungary	1:38.606	QF
1	2	Beatriz Manchon and Maria Teresa Portela	Spain	1:41.338	QF
1	3	Caroline Brunet and Mylanie Barre	Canada	1:43.434	QF
1	4	Shinobu Kitamoto and Yumiko Suzuki	Japan	1:44.730	QS
1	5	Anne Laure Viard and Marie Delattre	France	1:45.090	QS
1	6	Kathryn Colin and Lauren Spalding	United States	1:45.158	QS
1	7	Florica Vulpeş and Lidia Talpă	Romania	1:45.386	QS
1	8	Natalya Sergeyeva and Ellina Uzhakhova	Kazakhstan	1:46.710	QS
2	1	Birgit Fischer and Carolin Leonhardt	Germany	1:39.588	QF
2	2	Xu Linbei and Zhong Hongyan	China	1:40.943	QF
2	3	Aneta Pastuszka and Beata Sokołowska-Kulesza	Poland	1:41.164	QF
2	4	Sofia Paldanius and Anna Karlsson	Sweden	1:44.059	QS
2	5	Delyana Dacheva and Bonka Pindzheva	Bulgaria	1:44.268	QS
2	6	Hanna Puchkova and Alena Bets	Belarus	1:45.279	QS
2	7	Paula Harvey and Susan Tegg	Australia	1:46.319	QS

== Semifinal ==
The top three finishers in the semifinal race qualified for the final, joining the six teams that had advanced directly from the heats. The other six teams were eliminated. The semifinal was raced on August 26.

1.	Delyana Dacheva and Bonka Pindzheva (BUL)	1:44.246	QF
2.	Sofia Paldanius and Anna Karlsson (SWE)	1:44.570	QF
3.	Hanna Puchkova and Alena Bets (BLR)	1:45.234	QF
4.	Anne Laure Viard and Marie Delattre (FRA)	1:45.626
5.	Florica Vulpeş and Lidia Talpă (ROU)	1:45.770
6.	Natalya Sergeyeva and Ellina Uzhakhova (KAZ)	1:46.214
7.	Kathryn Colin and Lauren Spalding (USA)	1:46.786
8.	Shinobu Kitamoto and Yumiko Suzuki (JPN)	1:47.614
9.	Paula Harvey and Susan Tegg (AUS)	1:51.402

== Final ==
The final was raced on August 28.

Gold	Katalin Kovács and Nataša Janić (HUN)	1:38.101
Silver	Birgit Fischer and Carolin Leonhardt (GER)	1:39.533
Bronze	Aneta Pastuszka and Beata Sokołowska-Kulesza (POL)	1:40.077
4.	Xu Linbei and Zhong Hongyan (CHN)	1:40.913
5.	Beatriz Manchon and Maria Teresa Portela (ESP)	1:42.409
6.	Delyana Dacheva and Bonka Pindzheva (BUL)	1:42.553
7.	Caroline Brunet and Mylanie Barre (CAN)	1:42.833
8.	Sofia Paldanius and Anna Karlsson (SWE)	1:43.077
9.	Hanna Puchkova and Alena Bets (BLR)	1:43.729
