= Luke Morrison =

Australian canoeist

Medal record

Men's canoe sprint

World Championships
Silver medal – second place	2009 Dartmouth	K-2 1000 m

Luke Morrison is an Australian canoe sprinter who has competed since the late 2000s. He won a silver medal in the K-2 1000 m event at the 2009 ICF Canoe Sprint World Championships in Dartmouth.
