= Joana Sousa =

Portuguese canoeist

Medal record

Women's canoe sprint

World Championships
Bronze medal – third place	2009 Dartmouth	K-4 200 m

Joana Sousa is a Portuguese sprint canoer and marathon canoeist who has competed since the late 2000s. She won a bronze medal in the K-4 200 m event at the 2009 ICF Canoe Sprint World Championships in Dartmouth.
