= Ganna Pushkova-Areshka =

Belarusian sprint canoer (born 1978)

Medal record

Women's canoe sprint

World Championships
Bronze medal – third place	2006 Szeged	K-2 1000 m

Ganna Puchkova-Areshka (alternate listings: Anna Puchkova, Hanna Puchkova; born April 20, 1978) is a Belarusian sprint canoer who competed in the mid to late 2000s. She won a bronze medal in the K-2 1000 m event at the 2006 ICF Canoe Sprint World Championships in Szeged.

Puchkova-Areshka also finished ninth in the K-2 500 m event at the 2004 Summer Olympics in Athens.
