= Cătălin Costache =

Romanian canoeist

Medal record

Men's canoe sprint

Representing Romania

World Championships
Silver medal – second place	2011 Szeged	C-4 1000 m
Bronze medal – third place	2009 Dartmouth	C-4 1000 m

European Championships
Silver medal – second place	2012 Zagreb	C-4 1000 m
Silver medal – second place	2013 Montemor-o-Velho	C-4 1000 m

Cătălin Costache (born July 31, 1987) is a Romanian sprint canoer who has been competing since the late 2000s. He was part of the gold medal winning team at the European Kayak-Canoe Championships in Milan in 2008, and won a bronze medal in the C-4 1000 m event at the 2009 ICF Canoe Sprint World Championships in Dartmouth, Nova Scotia.
