= Jean Baptiste Lutz =

French canoeist

Personal information
- Born: January 12, 1988 (age 38)
Medal record
Representing France
Men's canoe sprint
World Championships
Bronze medal – third place	2009 Dartmouth	K-1 4 x 200 m

Jean Baptiste Lutz (born January 12, 1988) is a French sprint canoeist who has competed since the late 2000s. He won a bronze medal in the K-1 4 x 200 m event at the 2009 ICF Canoe Sprint World Championships in Dartmouth.
