= Oleg Kharytonov =

Ukrainian canoeist

Personal information
- Born: 8 February 1988 (age 38)
Medal record
Men's canoe sprint
World Championships
Silver medal – second place	2009 Dartmouth	K-1 200 m

Oleg Kharytonov (Ukrainian: Олег Іванович Харитонов; born 8 February 1988) is a Ukrainian sprint canoeist who has competed since the late 2000s. He won a silver medal in the K-1 200 m event at the 2009 ICF Canoe Sprint World Championships in Dartmouth.
