= Artem Kononuk =

Russian sprint canoer (born 1989)

Personal information
- Born: December 19, 1989 (age 36)
Medal record
Men's canoe sprint
World Championships
Bronze medal – third place	2009 Dartmouth	K-1 200 m

Artem Kononuk (Russian: Артём Андреевич Кононюк; born December 19, 1989) is a Russian sprint canoer who has competed since the late 2000s. He won a bronze medal in the K-1 200 m event at the 2009 ICF Canoe Sprint World Championships in Dartmouth.
