= Magdalena Krukowska =

Polish canoeist

Medal record
Event	1st	2nd	3rd
Olympic Games	0	0	0
World Championships	0	1	1
European Championships	0	1	1
European Games	0	0	0
Total	0	2	2

Women's canoe sprint

Representing Poland

World Championships
Silver medal – second place	2011 Szeged	K-2 200 m
Bronze medal – third place	2010 Poznań	K-4 500 m

European Championships
Silver medal – second place	2013 Montemor-o-Velho	K-2 200 m
Bronze medal – third place	2009 Brandenburg	K4-500 m

Magdalena Krukowska (born 1987) is a Polish sprint canoer who has competed since the late 2000s. She won a bronze medal in the K-4 500 m event at the 2010 ICF Canoe Sprint World Championships in Poznań.
