= Alexandru Ceaușu =

Romanian canoeist

Medal record

Men's sprint kayak

Representing Romania

World Championships
| Silver medal – second place | 2003 Gainesville | K-4 200 m |
| Silver medal – second place | 2003 Gainesville | K-4 500 m |

European Championships
| Silver medal – second place | 2006 Račice | K-4 500 m |

Alexandru Bodgan Ceauşu (born 12 October 1980 in Bucureşti) is a Romanian sprint kayaker who competed in the early to mid-2000s. He won two silver medals at the 2003 ICF Canoe Sprint World Championships in Gainesville, earning them in the K-4 200 m event (with Corneli Vasile Curuzan, Marian Baban and Romică Şerban) and K-4 500 m events (also with Curuzan, Baban and Şerban).

Competing in the men's K-4 500 m event, Ceauşu won a silver medal at the 2006 Canoe Sprint European Championships in Račice (with Marian Baban, Ştefan Vasile and Alin Anton).

Ceauşu also finished seventh in the K-4 1000 m event at the 2004 Summer Olympics in Athens (with Marian Baban, Corneli Vasile Curuzan and Ştefan Vasile).
