= Piotr Siemionowski =

Polish sprint canoeist (born 1988)

Medal record
Event	1st	2nd	3rd
Olympic Games	0	0	0
World Championships	2	0	1
European Championships	1	0	1
European Games	0	0	0
Total	3	0	2

Men's canoe sprint

World Championships
Gold medal – first place	2011 Szeged	K-1 200 m
Gold medal – first place	2013 Duisburg	K–1 200 m Relay
Bronze medal – third place	2010 Poznań	K-1 200 m

European Championships
Gold medal – first place	2011 Belgrade	K-1 200 m
Bronze medal – third place	2010 Trasona	K-1 200 m

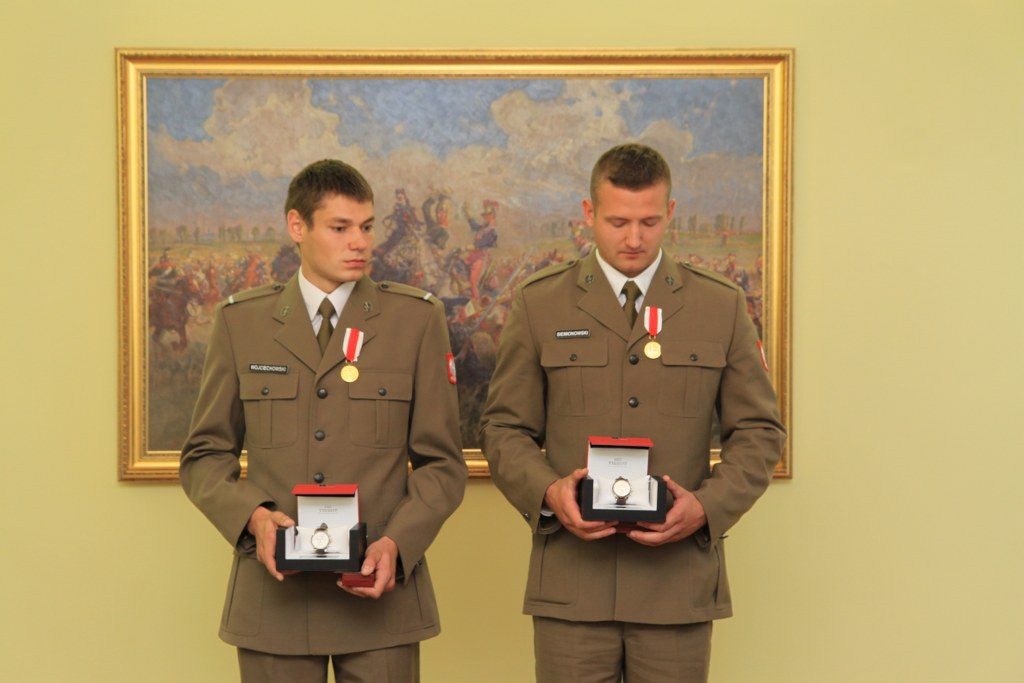
Private 1st Class Paweł Wojciechowski (pole vaulter) and Private Piotr Siemionowski (kayaker) decorated with the Golden Medals of Merit for National Defence – September 2011.

Piotr Siemionowski (born 6 June 1988 in Mrągowo) is a Polish sprint canoeist who has been competing since the late 2000s. He won a World Champion title in the K-1 200 m event at the 2011 ICF Canoe Sprint World Championships in Szeged, Hungary.

Siemionowski trains in the Zawisza Bydgoszcz.
