= Paula Harvey =

Australian canoeist

Medal record

Women's canoe sprint

World Championships
Bronze medal – third place	2003 Gainesville	K-4 1000 m

Paula Harvey (born 12 June 1975) is an Australian sprint canoeist who competed in the early to mid-2000s. She won a bronze medal in the K-4 1000 m event at the 2003 ICF Canoe Sprint World Championships in Gainesville.

Harvey also competed in the K-2 500 m event at the 2004 Summer Olympics in Athens, but was eliminated in the semifinals.
