= Mykola Kremer =

Ukrainian canoeist

Medal record

Men's canoe sprint

World Championships
Bronze medal – third place	2006 Szeged	K-1 200 m

European Championships
Bronze medal – third place	2006 Račice	K-1 200 m
Bronze medal – third place	2009 Brandenburg	K-2 200 m

Mykola Kremer is a Ukrainian sprint canoer who has competed since the late 2000s. He won a bronze medal in the K-1 200 m event at the 2006 ICF Canoe Sprint World Championships in Szeged.
