= Susan Tegg =

Australian sprint canoeist (born 1975)

Susan Tegg (born 15 September 1975) is an Australian sprint canoeist who competed in the mid-2000s. At the 2004 Summer Olympics, she was eliminated in the semifinals of the K-2 500 m event.
