= Bonka Pindzheva =

Bulgarian canoeist

Medal record

Women's canoe sprint

World Championships
Silver medal – second place	2003 Gainesville	K-2 500 m
Bronze medal – third place	2002 Seville	K-2 200 m

Bonka Pindzheva (Bulgarian: Бонка Пинджева) (born October 12, 1970) is a Bulgarian sprint canoer who competed from the early 1990s to the mid-2000s (decade). She won two medals at the ICF Canoe Sprint World Championships with a silver (K-2 500 m: 2003) and a bronze (K-2 200 m: 2002).

Pindzheva also competed in three Summer Olympics, earning her best finish of sixth in the K-2 500 m event at Athens in 2004.
