= Florica Vulpeș =

Romanian sprint canoer (born 1982)

Medal record

Women's canoe sprint

World Championships
Silver medal – second place	2005 Zagreb	K-4 1000 m
Bronze medal – third place	2006 Szeged	K-4 500 m

Florica Vulpeş (born March 13, 1982, in Cornereva) is a Romanian sprint canoer who competed in the mid-2000s. She won two medals at the ICF Canoe Sprint World Championships with a silver (K-4 1000 m: 2005) and a bronze (K-4 500 m: 2006).

Vulpeş also competed in the K-2 500 m event at the 2004 Summer Olympics in Athens, but was eliminated in the semifinals.
