= Lasse Nielsen (canoeist) =

Danish canoeist

Medal record

World Championships
Bronze medal – third place	2011 Szeged	K-1 4 x 200 m

Lasse Nielsen (born 10 July 1984) is a Danish sprint canoer who competed in the mid-2000s. At the 2004 Summer Olympics in Athens, he was eliminated in the semifinals of both the K-2 500 m and the K-2 1000 m events.
