= Silke Hörmann =

German sprint canoer (born 1986)

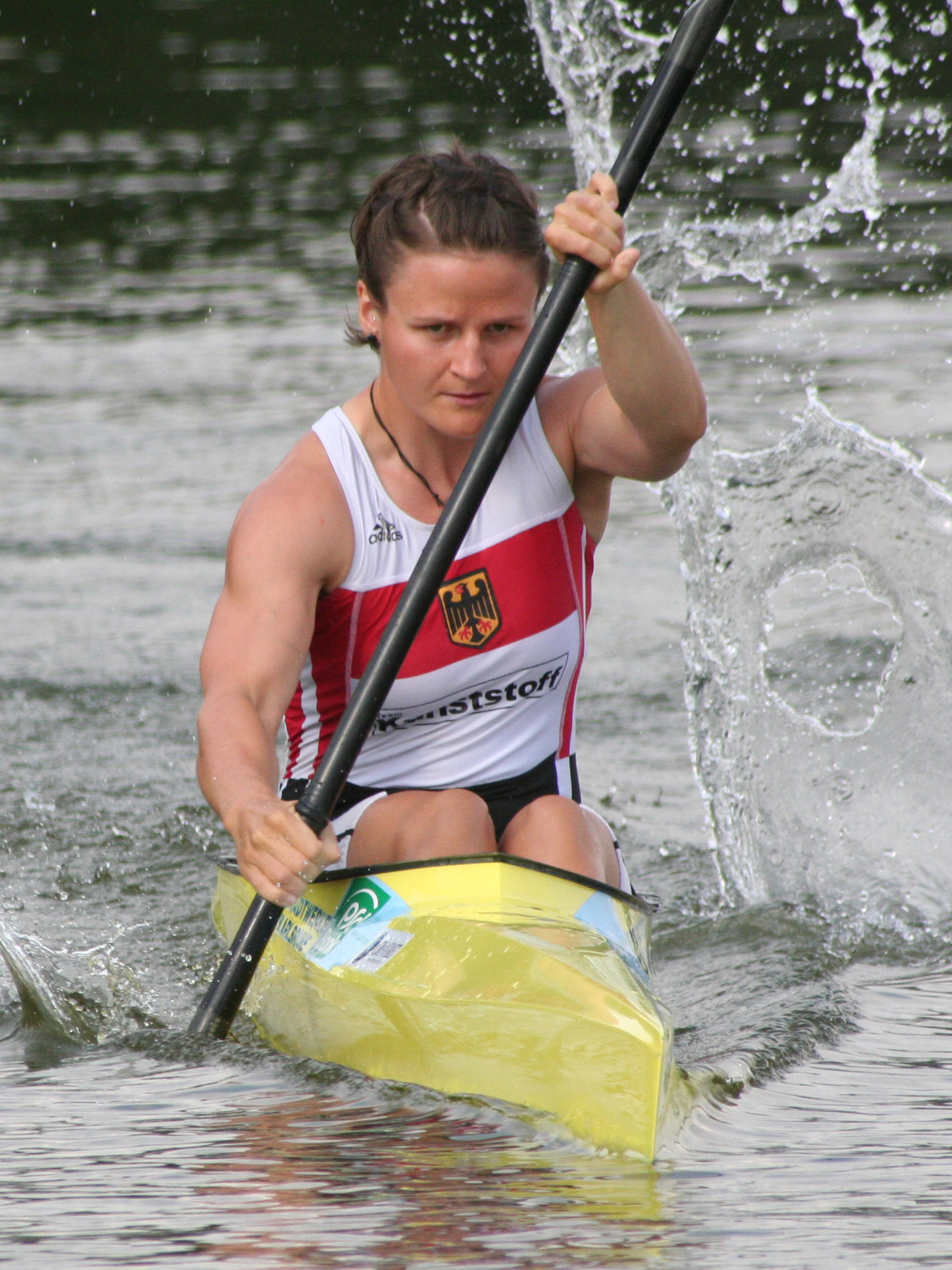
- Hörmann in 2010

Medal record

Women's canoe sprint

World Championships
Silver medal – second place	2006 Szeged	K-4 1000 m
Silver medal – second place	2010 Poznań	K-2 1000 m
Silver medal – second place	2011 Szeged	K-4 500 m

European Championships
Silver medal – second place	2012 Zagreb	K-1 1000 m

Silke Hörmann (born 1986) is a German sprint canoer who has competed since the mid-2000s. She has won two silver medals at the ICF Canoe Sprint World Championships (K-2 1000 m: 2010, K-4 1000 m: 2006, 2011).
