= Zoltán Benkő =

Hungarian canoeist (born 1983)

Zoltán Benkő (born 13 June 1983 in Budapest), is a Hungarian canoe sprinter who has competed since the mid-2000s. Competing in two Summer Olympics, he earned his best finish of ninth twice (K-1 1000 m: 2008, K-2 1000 m: 2004).
