= Jana Smidakova =

Spanish canoeist

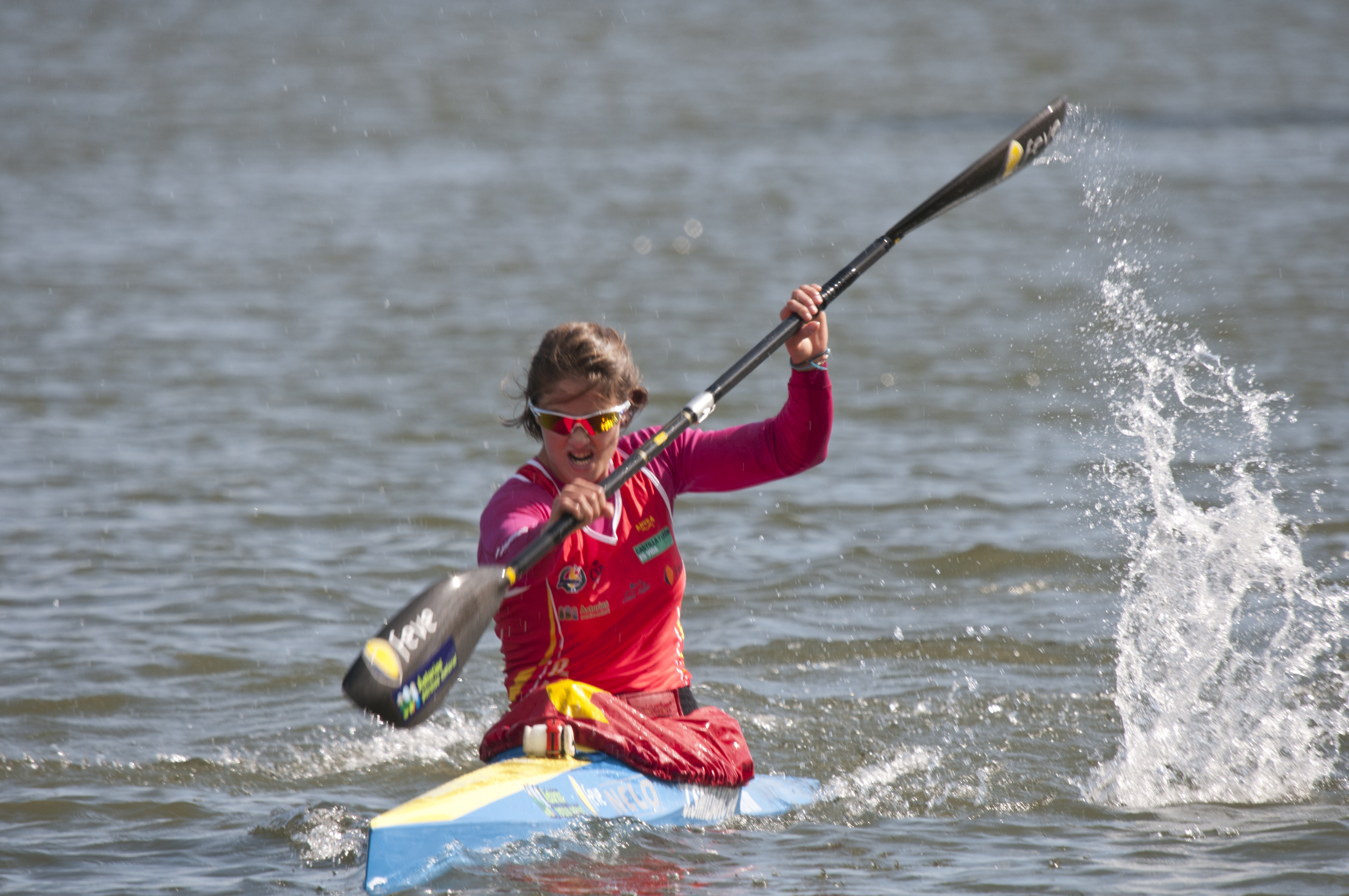

Medal record

Women's canoe sprint

World Championships
Silver medal – second place	2003 Gainesville	K-4 200 m
Silver medal – second place	2005 Zagreb	K-2 200 m
Bronze medal – third place	2003 Gainesville	K-4 500 m
Bronze medal – third place	2005 Zagreb	K-4 200 m
Bronze medal – third place	2009 Dartmouth	K-4 500 m

European Championships
Bronze medal – third place	2012 Zagreb	K-2 1000 m

Jana Smidakova (born 6 November 1983) is a Czech-born, Spanish sprint canoeist who has competed since the mid-2000s. She won five medals at the ICF Canoe Sprint World Championships with two silvers (K-2 200 m: 2005, K-4 200 m: 2003) and three bronzes (K-4 200 m: 2005, K-4 500 m: 2003, 2009)

Smidakova also competed in two Summer Olympics, earning her best finish of fifth on two occasions (2004: K-4 500 m, 2008: K-4 500 m).
