= Taras Valko =

Belarusian canoeist

Medal record

Men's canoe sprint

Representing Belarus

World Championships
Gold medal – first place	2009 Dartmouth	K-4 200 m

Taras Valko (born 2 February 1985) is a Belarusian sprint canoeist who has competed in the late 2000s. He won a gold medal in the K-4 200 m event at the 2009 ICF Canoe Sprint World Championships in Dartmouth.
