= Pablo Andrés =

Spanish canoeist

Medal record

Men's canoe sprint

World Championships
Gold medal – first place	2010 Poznań	K-1 4 x 200 m
Gold medal – first place	2011 Szeged	K-1 4 x 200 m

Pablo Andrés (Castilla y Leon) is a Spanish sprint canoer who has competed since the late 2000s. He won a gold medal in the K-1 4 x 200 m event at the 2010 ICF Canoe Sprint World Championships in Poznań.
