= Sergey Khovanskiy =

Russian sprint canoer (born 1977)

Medal record

Men's canoe sprint

World Championships
Bronze medal – third place	2006 Szeged	K-4 200 m
Bronze medal – third place	2007 Dusiburg	K-4 200 m
Bronze medal – third place	2009 Dartmouth	K-4 200 m

Sergey Khovanskiy (born February 12, 1977) is a Russian sprint canoer who has competed since the late 2000s. He won three bronze medals in the K-4 200 m event at the ICF Canoe Sprint World Championships, earning them in 2006, 2007, and 2009.
