= Jonas Ems =

German sprint canoer

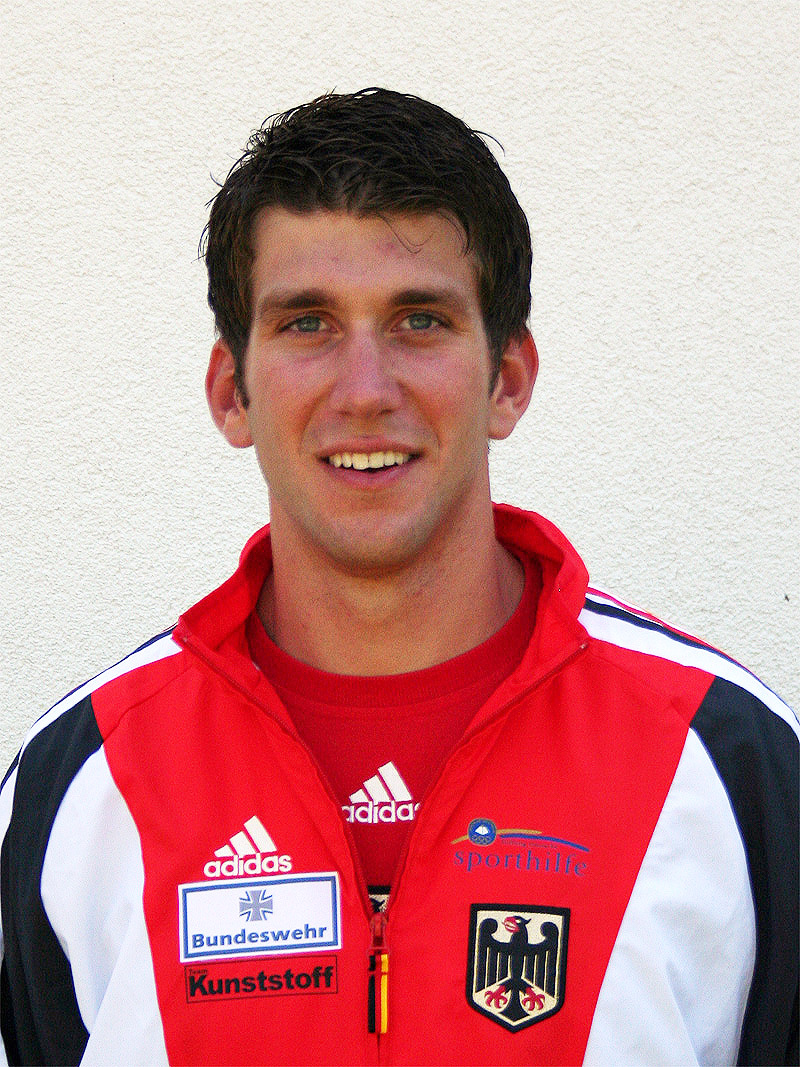

Medal record

Men's canoe sprint

Representing Germany

World Championships
Gold medal – first place	2007 Duisburg	K-1 200 m
Silver medal – second place	2005 Zagreb	K-4 200 m
Silver medal – second place	2009 Dartmouth	K-1 4 x 200 m
Bronze medal – third place	2013 Duisburg	K–2 200 m

European Championships
Silver medal – second place	2012 Zagreb	K-2 200 m
Silver medal – second place	2013 Montemor-o-Velho	K-2 200 m

Jonas Ems (born 26 August 1986) is a German sprint canoer who has competed since the mid-2000s. He has won four medals at the ICF Canoe Sprint World Championships with a gold (K-1 200 m: 2007), two silvers (K-1 4 × 200 m: 2009, K-4 200 m: 2005) and a bronze (K-2 200 m: 2013).

Ems also competed at the 2008 Summer Olympics in Beijing in the K-1 500 m event, but was eliminated in the semifinals. At the 2012 Summer Olympics, he and Ronald Rauhe reached the final of the K-2 200 m event.
