= Anna Carpenter =

Swedish sprint canoer (born 1975)

Medal record

Women's canoe sprint

World Championships
Silver medal – second place	1998 Szeged	K-4 200 m
Bronze medal – third place	1997 Dartmouth	K-4 200 m
Bronze medal – third place	1998 Szeged	K-2 1000 m
Bronze medal – third place	2006 Szeged	K-4 200 m

Anna Carpenter (previously Karlsson, born 12 May 1975) is a Swedish sprint canoeist who has competed since the late 1990s. She won four medals at the ICF Canoe Sprint World Championships with a silver (K-4 200 m: 1998) and three bronzes (K-2 1000 m: 1998, K-4 200 m: 1997, 2006).

Karlsson also finished eighth in the K-2 500 m event at the 2004 Summer Olympics in Athens.
