= Ekaitz Saies =

Spanish canoeist (born 1982)

Medal record

Men's Canoe sprint

World Championships
Gold medal – first place	2009 Dartmouth	K-1 4 x 200 m

Ekaitz Saies (born 2 March 1982 in San Sebastián) is a Spanish sprint canoer who has been competing since the late 2000s. He won a gold medal in the K-1 4 × 200 m event at the 2009 ICF Canoe Sprint World Championships in Dartmouth, Nova Scotia.
