= Sergiy Bezugliy =

Ukrainian-born Azerbaijani sprint canoer

Personal information
- Full name: Sergiy Oleksandrovych Bezugliy
- Born: October 7, 1984 (age 41) Mykolaiv, Ukraine
Medal record
Men's canoe sprint
World Championships
Representing Ukraine
| Bronze medal – third place | 2006 Szeged | C-2 1000 m |
Representing Azerbaijan
| Silver medal – second place | 2009 Dartmouth | C-2 1000 m |
| Silver medal – second place | 2010 Poznań | C-2 500 m |
| Silver medal – second place | 2011 Szeged | C-2 500 m |
| Silver medal – second place | 2011 Szeged | C-2 1000 m |
| Silver medal – second place | 2011 Szeged | C-1 4 x 200 m |
| Bronze medal – third place | 2009 Dartmouth | C-2 500 m |
European Championships
Representing Ukraine
| Silver medal – second place | 2008 Milan | C-2 1000 m |
Representing Azerbaijan
| Gold medal – first place | 2010 Trasona | C-2 1000 m |
| Silver medal – second place | 2010 Trasona | C-2 500 m |
| Silver medal – second place | 2011 Belgrade | C-2 500 m |
| Bronze medal – third place | 2009 Brandenburg | C-2 500 m |

Sergiy Oleksandrovych Bezugliy (Ukrainian: Сергій Олександрович Безуглий; born October 7, 1984, in Mykolaiv) is a Ukrainian-born Azerbaijani sprint canoeist. He competed internationally for Ukraine through 2008.

== Career ==
In 2009, Bezugliy began representing Azerbaijan. He has won four medals at the ICF Canoe Sprint World Championships – two silvers (C-2 500: 2010, C-2 1000 m: 2009 for Azerbaijan) and two bronzes (C-2 500 m: 2009, C-2 1000 m: 2006 for Ukraine).

He finished eighth for Ukraine in the C-2 500 m event at the 2008 Summer Olympics in Beijing. At the London 2012 Summer Olympics, he competed in the men's canoe double (C2) 1000 m event, finishing fourth in the final with a time of 3:37.219.
