= Lidia Talpă =

Romanian canoeist

Medal record

Women's canoe sprint

World Championships
| Silver medal – second place | 2005 Zagreb | K-4 1000 m |
| Bronze medal – third place | 2006 Szeged | K-4 500 m |

Lidia Talpă (born November 3, 1982, in Turnu Măgurele) is a Romanian sprint canoer who competed in the mid-2000s. She won two medals at the ICF Canoe Sprint World Championships with a silver (K-4 1000 m: 2005) and a bronze (K-4 500 m: 2006).

Talpă also competed in the K-2 500 m event at the 2004 Summer Olympics in Athens, but was eliminated in the semifinals.
