= Torsten Lubisch =

German sprint canoer (born 1984)

Medal record

Men's canoe sprint

World Championships
Silver medal – second place	2009 Dartmouth	K-1 4 x 200 m

Torsten Lubisch (born September 3, 1984) is a German sprint canoer who has competed since the late 2000s. He won a silver medal in the K-1 4 x 200 m event at the 2009 ICF Canoe Sprint World Championships in Dartmouth.
