= 2009 ICF Canoe Sprint World Championships =

ICF Canoe Sprint World Championships 2009 in Nova Scotia

- Official logo for the 2009 ICF Canoe Sprint World Championships
- Host city: Dartmouth, Nova Scotia, Canada
- Nations: 68
- Athletes: 669
- Events: 27 + 8 exhibitions
- Opening: 12 August
- Closing: 16 August
- Main venue: Lake Banook
- Website: Official website

The 2009 ICF Canoe Sprint World Championships were held 12–16 August 2009 in Dartmouth, Nova Scotia, Canada, on Lake Banook. The competition was organized by the International Canoe Federation (ICF). The Canadian city was selected to host the championships in October 2003 after having done so previously in 1997. Final preparations were made after the 2008 Summer Olympics in Beijing, with competition format changed for the first time since the 2001 championships. Four exhibition events for both paddleability and women's canoe were added. Sponsorship was local within the province of Nova Scotia and the Halifax Regional Municipality. Media coverage was provided from Canada, Europe and the United States on the Internet, television and mobile phone. 669 canoeists from 68 nations participated at the championships themselves.

Germany won the most medals with 18 medals and seven golds. Men's canoe's overall winner was Russia with seven medals (one gold, five silver and one bronze). In men's kayak, the big winner was Germany with five medals (three golds, one silver and one bronze). Hungary won medals in all nine events of women's kayak. Athlete comments ranged from disgust over the format adjustment made to the canoe sprint program for the 2012 Summer Olympics to not being upset at all. Paddleability's success at these championships will hopefully push for inclusion into future Paralympic level events.

Women's Canoe events were introduced for the first time at an ICF Canoe Sprint World Championships in 2009 as exhibition events.

== Explanation of events ==
Canoe sprint competitions are broken up into canoe (C), an open canoe with a single-blade paddle, or in kayaks (K), a closed canoe with a double-bladed paddle. Each canoe or kayak can hold one person (1), two people (2), or four people (4). For each of the specific canoes or kayaks, such as a K-1 (kayak single), the competition distances can be 200 metres (660 ft), 500 metres (1,600 ft), or 1,000 metres (3,300 ft) long. When a competition is listed as a C-2 500 m event as an example, it means two people are in a canoe competing at a 500 metres (1,600 ft) distance.

== Preliminaries to the event ==
Dartmouth was awarded the 2009 championships at an ICF Board of Directors meeting in Madrid, Spain, on 23 October 2003.

=== Event format changes ===
At the 2008 ICF Congress in Rome, a new program for the championships was approved. This marked the first change in the program since the addition of the K-4 1000 m women's event at the 2001 championships in Poznań. Men's C-4 500 m, men's K-4 500 m, women's K-4 1000 m events were replaced by C-1 4 × 200 m relay (men only) and K-1 4 × 200 m relay (both men and women). Women's C-1 200 m, C-1 500 m, C-2 200 m and C-2 500 m events were shown as exhibition. Paddleability exhibition events of K-1 200 m LTA (men & women), K-2 200 m TA&A (mixed), and C-2 200 m LTA&A (mixed) also took place (LTATA – Legs, Trunks, and Arms or Trunks and Arms; LTA – Legs, Trunks, and Arms; and TA&A – Trunks and Arms, or Arms). Support for women's Canadian and the paddle ability events were confirmed at an ICF Board of Directors meeting in Lausanne, Switzerland, on 18–20 March 2009. A training camp was held for women's canoe in conjunction with the championships.

=== Official meetings ===
In January 2009, ICF Secretary General Simon Toulson visited Halifax for three days and was impressed with the history of canoeing in the area and the development of future canoeists for Canada. Two public meetings were held in Dartmouth and Halifax on 24 and 26 March regarding the championships.

=== Facility ===
During the end of 2008, Lake Banook had its canoe course upgraded by Dexter Construction Limited. Water that had been pumped out of lake ceased on 15 December 2008, allowing the lake to rise back to its regular level by February 2009. Cleanup, restoration and landscaping was completed in the spring of 2009. By May 2009, this construction included new concrete abutments at the 1,000 metres (3,300 ft), 500 metres (1,600 ft), 200 metres (660 ft), and finish points, debris and abutment cleanup, ten new lane wires, four new cross wires, and 800 new buoys. Starting gates were tested during the second national team trials held at the lake on 27–28 June 2009. Temporary grandstands for 20,000 spectators per day were also constructed.

Additional changes were for environmental reasons. This included the Halifax Regional Water Commission, Conserve Nova Scotia, and Nova Scotia Environment providing water stations for athletes, spectators and volunteers to fill up reusable water bottles which were purchased on site. It eliminated 100,000 disposable bottles and 1,400 kilograms (3,100 lb) of plastic waste. Dalhousie University's residence halls used energy efficient lighting and cleaning products. The university's cafeteria eliminated the use of trays, lessening food waste, energy consumption and daily water usage by 4,000 litres (880 imp gal; 1,100 US gal). A buy local policy and delivery truck that ran entirely on vegetable oil fuel was also used.

According to a 10 August 2009 press release, the staging area was at Birch Cove Park in Halifax. 669 from 68 countries competed at the championships with an estimated 100,000 spectators.

=== Sponsorships ===
The Atlantic Lottery Corporation presented the "Women in Canoe" program that included 21 female canoeists from 12 different countries. Festival entertainment was sponsored by the Nova Scotia Gaming Corporation, including a "Concert on the Lake" by Matt Mays on 14 August that drew 10,000 spectators. Other sponsors include Bell Aliant as presenters, silver sponsors were The Chronicle Herald of Halifax, CFRQ Q104 FM radio, CBC Sports and the Halifax Water Authority; the bronze sponsors were NOREX, Helly Hansen, Conserve Nova Scotia, Nova Scotia environment, Mills fashion and NELO; government sponsorship of Department of Canadian Heritage, Nova Scotia Health Promotion and Protection, and the Halifax Regional Municipality; other supporters of Mic Mac Mall, CBS Outdoor, Metro Transit of Halifax, and Office Interiors; and friends of Ambassadors, Priority Management, KayakPro, the Office of Aboriginal Affairs, and The Cider House Company Limited.

== Participating nations ==
68 nations were listed on the preliminary entry list. The numbers in parentheses shown are for men and women who competed for each respective nation.

- Albania (0/2)
- Algeria (1/0)
- Angola (2/0)
- Argentina (6/2)
- Armenia (3/0)
- Australia (11/7)
- Austria (1/3)
- Azerbaijan (3/0)
- Belarus (13/1)
- Belgium (4/0)
- Brazil (8/6)
- Bulgaria (5/0)
- Canada (27/16)
- Chile (2/0)
- Colombia (0/1)
- Cook Islands (1/0)
- Croatia (2/0)
- Cuba (6/0)
- Czech Republic (10/4)
- Denmark (9/3)
- Ecuador (1/2)
- Finland (1/2)
- France (16/5)
- Germany (22/7)
- Ghana (6/0)
- Great Britain (10/9)
- Greece (3/1)
- Guatemala (2/0)
- Hungary (24/9)
- India (6/0)
- Ireland (4/1)
- Israel (1/0)
- Italy (13/5)
- Japan (10/4)
- Kazakhstan (4/1)
- Kyrgyzstan (1/0)
- Latvia (5/0)
- Lithuania (8/0)
- Luxembourg (2/0)
- Macao (3/1)
- Mexico (8/2)
- Netherlands (2/3)
- New Zealand (3/3)
- Norway (3/0)
- Philippines (5/0)
- Poland (15/8)
- Portugal (4/6)
- Puerto Rico (4/1)
- Romania (17/4)
- Russia (36/10)
- Senegal (1/0)
- Serbia (5/5)
- Singapore (5/6)
- Slovakia (12/2)
- Slovenia (3/2)
- South Africa (8/1)
- Spain (30/10)
- Sri Lanka (1/0)
- Sweden (6/5)
- Switzerland (2/0)
- Tajikistan (1/0)
- Thailand (1/0)
- Tunisia (1/0)
- Turkey (8/0)
- Ukraine (18/5)
- United States (13/14)
- Uzbekistan (6/1)
- Venezuela (12/3)

Russia had the most overall attendees with 46 while Canada topped the number of women competing with 16.

The media guide listed 71 nations as participating, but seven nations listed did not compete (Cameroon, Dominican Republic, Montenegro, Nigeria, South Korea, Togo and Uganda) while four nations who competed were not listed (Ghana, Kyrgyzstan, Senegal and Tajikistan).

The ICF sponsored ten athletes in a development program in Romania in early 2009 that allowed them to compete at the world championships. These countries included Algeria, Armenia, Sri Lanka, and Thailand.

== Coverage ==
Media coverage was provided by the Canadian Broadcasting Corporation (CBC) Sports in Canada, Eurosport, and Universal Sports in the United States. Live results were provided onsite from the official website that was sponsored by Bell Aliant which ran 9 am to 4:30 pm AST on 13 August, 9 AM to 3:55 pm AST on 14 August, 8:44 am to 5:45 pm AST on 15 August 2009, and 8:30 am to 3:46 pm AST on 16 August. Championship information was also available on Twitter. CBC Sports had broadcast times of 2–3 PM AST on 15 August 2009 followed by late night coverage at 12:30 am AST on 16 August 2009 along with coverage on the web at http://www.cbcsports.ca. Universal Sports telecasted the finals for both the 15th and the 16th live and are now seen on demand on their website. A total of 30 million people from 36 countries worldwide watched the event on television.

Results were transmitted for free with mobile web application named ZAP result. This mobile widget was developed by Norex.ca.

== Schedule ==
=== Opening and closing ceremonies ===
Opening ceremonies took place at 8 pm AST on 12 August. 10,000 people watched 68 countries participate in the opening ceremonies that included Canoe'09 chair Chris Keevill, ICF President José Perurena, and Sport Canada minister Gary Lunn. The Concert on the Lake took place at 8 pm AST on 14 August with over 10,000 attendees. Closing ceremonies occurred on 16 August at 4 pm AST. Medals were presented in Mi'kmaq baskets for gold medalists, traditional European baskets for silver medalists, and in traditional African Nova Scotian baskets for bronze medalists. Mi'kmaq is a territory in the Atlantic Provinces of Canada prior to the settlement by the French in the 17th century. The settlement was rotated between the French and British between 1627 and 1755 before the British took over the area after the French and Indian War. Africans settled in Nova Scotia during the Atlantic slave trade that ran from the 16th to 19th centuries. The closing ceremonies on 16 August included passing the ICF flag from Dartmouth to the 2010 world championship hosts in Poznań.

=== Festival performances ===
Festivals for all four days started 30 minutes before the first race and ended 30 minutes after the last race each day. Live entertainment took place each of the days along with vendors, displays and exhibits. Boating safety was discussed along with interactive exhibits on canoe construction and allowing to touch live animals from around the world, including tarantulas and a 12 feet (3.7 m)-long python.

=== Competition schedule ===
==== Men's canoe ====
Event	Heats	Semifinals	Finals
C-1 200 m	15 August	15 August	15/16 August
C-1 500 m	13 August	14 August	16 August
C-1 1000 m	13 August	14 August	15 August
C-1 4 × 200 m relay	16 August	Not held	16 August
C-2 200 m	15 August	15 August	15/16 August
C-2 500 m	13 August	14 August	16 August
C-2 1000 m	13 August	14 August	15 August
C-4 200 m	15 August	15 August	16 August
C-4 1000 m	13 August	14 August	15 August

==== Men's kayak ====
Event	Heats	Semifinals	Finals
K-1 200 m	15 August	15 August	15/16 August
K-1 500 m	13 August	14 August	16 August
K-1 1000 m	13 August	14 August	15 August
K-1 4 × 200 m relay	16 August	Not held	16 August
K-2 200 m	15 August	15 August	15/16 August
K-2 500 m	13 August	14 August	16 August
K-2 1000 m	13 August	14 August	15 August
K-4 200 m	15 August	15 August	15/16 August
K-4 1000 m	13 August	14 August	15 August

==== Women's kayak ====
Event	Heats	Semifinals	Finals
K-1 200 m	15 August	15 August	15/16 August
K-1 500 m	13 August	14 August	16 August
K-1 1000 m	13 August	14 August	15 August
K-1 4 × 200 m relay	16 August	Not held	16 August
K-2 200 m	15 August	15 August	15/16 August
K-2 500 m	13 August	14 August	16 August
K-2 1000 m	13 August	14 August	15 August
K-4 200 m	15 August	15 August	15/16 August
K-4 500 m	13 August	14 August	15 August

==== Women's canoe (exhibition) ====
Event	Heats	Semifinals	Finals
C-1 200 m	Not held	Not held	15 August
C-1 500 m	Not held	Not held	15 August
C-2 200 m	Not held	Not held	16 August
C-2 500 m	Not held	Not held	16 August

==== Paddleability (exhibition) ====
Event	Heats	Semifinals	Finals
C-2 200 m LTATA mixed	Not held	Not held	16 August
K-1 200 m LTA men	Not held	Not held	15 August
K-1 200 m LTA women	Not held	Not held	15 August
K-2 200 m TAA mixed	Not held	Not held	16 August

== Results ==
The preliminary draw was released on 9 August. This was updated again on 11 August.

=== Men's ===
Non-Olympic classes

==== Canoe ====
Russia was the top winner with seven medals with Nikolay Lipkin winning five medals. Belarus won three gold medals. Azerbaijan won a complete set of medals in the canoe discipline while Uzbekistan won its first ever gold medal at the championships.

Event	Gold	Time	Silver	Time	Bronze	Time
C-1 200 m	Valentyn Demyanenko (AZE)	39.048	Nikolay Lipkin (RUS)	39.234	Evgeny Shuklin (LTU)	39.978
C-1 500 m	Dzianis Harazha (BLR)	1:49.723	Nikolay Lipkin (RUS)	1:49.750	Mathieu Goubel (FRA)	1:50.714
C-1 1000 m	Vadim Menkov (UZB)	3:55.497	Mathieu Goubel (FRA)	3:56.047	Sebastian Brendel (GER)	4:00.215
C-1 4 × 200 m relay	Russia; Yevgeniy Ignatov; Nikolay Lipkin; Viktor Melantyev; Ivan Shtyl	2:49.838	Hungary; Attila Bozsik; László Foltán; Gábor Horváth; Attila Vajda	2:51.977	France; Mathieu Goubel; Thomas Simart; William Tchamba; Bertrand Hémonic	2:52.455
C-2 200 m	Lithuania; Tomas Gadeikis; Raimundas Labuckas	36.433	Russia; Yevgeniy Ignatov; Ivan Shtyl	36.753	Germany; Stefan Holtz; Robert Nuck	37.085
C-2 500 m	Germany; Stefan Holtz; Robert Nuck	1:41.310	Russia; Yevgeniy Ignatov; Ivan Shtyl	1:41.782	Azerbaijan; Sergey Bezugliy; Maksim Prokopenko	1:42.660
C-2 1000 m	Germany; Erik Leue; Tomasz Wylenzek	3:37.380	Azerbaijan; Sergey Bezugliy; Maksim Prokopenko	3:37.462	Russia; Nikolay Lipkin; Viktor Melantyev	3:38.758
C-4 200 m	Belarus; Aliaksandr Bahdanovich; Dzmitry Rabchanka; Aliaksandr Vauchetski; Andrei Bahdanovich	34.147	Russia; Aleksandr Kostoglod; Nikolay Lipkin; Viktor Melantyev; Sergey Ulegin	34.499	Hungary; Attila Bozsik; László Foltán; Gábor Horváth; Gergő Németh	35.235
C-4 1000 m	Belarus; Dzianis Harazha; Dzmitry Rabchanka; Dzmitry Vaitsishkin; Aliaksandr Vauchetski	3:21.595	Germany; Chris Wend; Thomas Lück; Erik Rebstock; Ronald Verch	3:22.141	Romania; Cătălin Costache; Silviu Simioncencu; Iosif Chirilă; Andrei Cuculici	3:23.733

==== Kayak ====
Germany won five medals in the men's kayak. Ronald Rauhe's three medals for Germany at these championships pushed his career total to 20, tying him with Torsten Gutsche (East Germany-Germany: 1989–99). Belarus won four golds with Vadzim Makhneu and Raman Piatrushenka each winning four of those golds.

Event	Gold	Time	Silver	Time	Bronze	Time
K-1 200 m	Ronald Rauhe (GER)	35.134	Oleg Kharytonov (UKR)	35.650	Artem Kononuk (RUS)	35.696
K-1 500 m	Ronald Rauhe (GER)	1:37.605	Anders Gustafsson (SWE)	1:37.679	Ken Wallace (AUS)	1:38.225
K-1 1000 m	Max Hoff (GER)	3:29.425	Anders Gustafsson (SWE)	3:30.976	Adam van Koeverden (CAN)	3:31.285
K-1 4 × 200 m relay	Spain; Francisco Llera; Saúl Craviotto; Carlos Pérez; Ekaitz Saies	2:27.422	Germany; Norman Bröckl; Jonas Ems; Torsten Lubisch; Ronald Rauhe	2:28.530	France; Guillaume Burger; Arnaud Hybois; Sébastien Jouve; Jean Baptiste Lutz	2:29.614
K-2 200 m	Belarus; Vadzim Makhneu; Raman Piatrushenka	32.229	Spain; Saúl Craviotto; Carlos Pérez	32.231	Canada; Andrew Willows; Richard Dober Jr.	32.653
K-2 500 m	Belarus; Vadzim Makhneu; Raman Piatrushenka	1:29.408	Hungary; Zoltán Kammerer; Gábor Kucsera	1:29.695	Germany; Hendrik Bertz; Marcus Gross	1:30.372
K-2 1000 m	Spain; Emilio Merchán; Diego Cosgaya	3:14.610	Australia; David Smith; Luke Morrison	3:15.809	Cuba; Reiner Torres; Carlos Montalvo	3:16.071
K-4 200 m	Belarus; Vadzim Makhneu; Raman Piatrushenka; Dziamyan Turchyn; Taras Valko	30.412	Slovakia; Juraj Tarr; Erik Vlček; Richard Riszdorfer; Michal Riszdorfer	30.525	Russia; Alexander Dyachenko; Sergey Khovanskiy; Stepan Shevchuk; Roman Zarubin	30.608
K-4 1000 m	Belarus; Vadzim Makhneu; Artur Litvinchuk; Raman Piatrushenka; Aliaksei Abalmasau	2:57.437	France; Guillaume Burger; Vincent Lecrubier; Philippe Colin; Sébastien Jouve	2:58.022	Slovakia; Juraj Tarr; Erik Vlček; Richard Riszdorfer; Michal Riszdorfer	2:58.593

=== Women's ===
Non-Olympic classes

==== Kayak ====
Hungary medaled in all nine events with Natasa Janics and Katalin Kovacs each winning five medals. Kovacs' five medals pushed her total medal count to 35, three behind Birgit Fischer's 38 (East Germany-Germany: 1978–2005). Bridgette Hartley's bronze medal in the K-1 1000 m event was the first for both South Africa and Africa at the world championships. Josefa Idem's bronze in the K-1 500 m event makes her the oldest medalist in the history of the championships.

Event	Gold	Time	Silver	Time	Bronze	Time
K-1 200 m	Nataša Janić (HUN)	40.866	Marta Walczykiewicz (POL)	41.209	Anne Laure Viard (FRA)	41.357
K-1 500 m	Katalin Kovács (HUN)	1:51.149	Katrin Wagner-Augustin (GER)	1:51.633	Josefa Idem (ITA)	1:51.860
K-1 1000 m	Katalin Kovács (HUN)	3:59.846	Franziska Weber (GER)	4:00.429	Bridgette Hartley (RSA)	4:00.966
K-1 4 × 200 m relay	Germany; Fanny Fischer; Nicole Reinhardt; Katrin Wagner-Augustin; Conny Waßmuth	2:50.806	Hungary; Zomilla Hegyi; Krisztina Fazekas; Nataša Janić; Tímea Paksy	2:51.756	Canada; Kia Byers; Émilie Fournel; Genevieve Orton; Karen Furneaux	2:54.638
K-2 200 m	Hungary; Nataša Janić; Katalin Kovács	37.508	Germany; Fanny Fischer; Nicole Reinhardt	37.682	Slovakia; Ivana Kmeťová; Martina Kohlová	37.774
K-2 500 m	Hungary; Danuta Kozák; Gabriella Szabó	1:41.144	Germany; Fanny Fischer; Nicole Reinhardt	1:42.023	Sweden; Josefin Nordlöw; Sofia Paldanius	1:42.276
K-2 1000 m	Poland; Małgorzata Chojnacka; Beata Mikołajczyk	3:40.425	Germany; Tina Dietze; Carolin Leonhardt	3:40.502	Hungary; Dalma Benedek; Erika Medveczky	3:43.020
K-4 200 m	Germany; Tina Dietze; Carolin Leonhardt; Katrin Wagner-Augustin; Conny Waßmuth	35.049	Hungary; Krisztina Fazekas; Nataša Janić; Katalin Kovács; Tímea Paksy	35.075	Portugal; Beatriz Gomes; Helena Rodrigues; Teresa Portela; Joana Sousa	35.657
K-4 500 m	Hungary; Dalma Benedek; Danuta Kozák; Nataša Janić; Katalin Kovács	1:33.090	Germany; Tina Dietze; Carolin Leonhardt; Katrin Wagner-Augustin; Nicole Reinhardt	1:33.094	Spain; Beatriz Manchón; Maria Teresa Portela; Jana Smidakova; Sonia Molanes	1:34.973

=== Exhibition ===
==== Women's canoe ====
Host nation Canada won all four of the exhibition events. Jenna Marks won three of these events (C-1 200 m, C-2 200 m, C-2 500 m). Other nations with top three finishes included Brazil, Ecuador, Great Britain and the United States. How about Russia?

Event	First	Time	Second	Time	Third	Time
C-1 200 m	Jenna Marks (CAN)	56.195	Hannah Menke (USA)	58.839	Luciana Costa (BRA)	1:00.404
C-1 500 m	Nicole Haywood (CAN)	2:20.762	Hannah Menke (USA)	2:29.630	Maria Kasakova (RUS)	2:32.064
C-2 200 m	Canada; Maria Halavrezos; Jenna Marks	48.399	Ecuador; Maria Belen Ibarra Trivino; Mia Cameila Friend Chung	50.991	Great Britain; Samantha Rippington; Lisa Suttle	51.141
C-2 500 m	Canada; Maria Halavrezos; Jenna Marks	2:10.625	Great Britain; Samantha Rippington; Lisa Suttle	2:18.427	Ecuador; Maria Belen Ibarra Trivino; Mia Cameila Friend Chung	2:19.377

==== Paddleability ====
Italy had four top three finishes to lead all nations in this event while the United States was second with three.

Event	First	Time	Second	Time	Third	Time
C-2 200 m LTATA mixed	United States; Tami Hetke; Augusto Perez	1:04.070	Brazil; Jose de Oliveiras Rodrigues; Carlos Roberto Tavares da Conceicao	1:04.401	Italy; Benedetto Nucatola; Sandra Truccolo	1:10.113
K-1 200 m LTA men	Ciro Ardito (ITA)	54.762	Sebastiao Valdir Dos Santos Abreu (BRA)	56.270	Robert Brown (USA)	57.786
K-1 200 m LTA women	Christine Gauthier (CAN)	1:08.594	Giovanna Chiriu (ITA)	1:09.278	Severine Amiot (FRA)	1:09.898
K-2 200 m TAA mixed	Italy; Anna Pani; Andreas Biagi	1:05.233	United States; Rebecca Lloyd; Mark Dunford	1:20.235	Canada; Christine Selinger; Christopher Pearson	1:38.217

== Aftermath ==
=== Athlete comments ===
Australia's Wallace commented that he was upset at the ICF's decision that was made during the championships to replace the men's 500 m events (C-1, C-2, K-1 and K-2) at the Summer Olympics with the 200 m events (men's C-1, K-1 and K-2; and women's K-1) for the upcoming Summer Olympics in London. Kovacs of Hungary stated that the addition of the women's K-1 200 m event for the 2012 Olympics will not change her training routine. Italy's Idem, who was competing in her 20th world championships, stated that she was just as "...nervous when ...[she]... was a 13-year-old girl (1977) and ...[she was]... the same today." Germany's Rauhe expressed his love for Canada by "...going on holiday now." in the host nation.

=== Paddleability's (Paracanoe's) future ===
In a 25 August 2009 ICF article, ICF Canoeing for All Committee and Canoe Kayak Canada's Domestic Development Director John Edwards thanked efforts of the paddlers involved in the paddleability events for the 2009 championships. Edwards stated that the efforts for paddleability's success are twofold. The first is for inclusion into the 2011 Special Olympics World Summer Games in Athens, Greece. Once this is recognized, the next goal is to get Special Olympic programs at a national level for inclusion into the 2016 Summer Paralympics. The second, a shorter-term one, is to have 24 nations from three continents participate at next year's canoe sprint world championships in Poznań. Besides the medalists from this year's world championships being from Italy, the United States, Canada, Brazil and France, other participants included Great Britain and Portugal. The process to include paddleability into the 2016 Summer Paralympics in Rio de Janeiro, Brazil began on 1 October 2009 and approval was reached on 16 July 2010.

== Medal table ==
Shown for the non-exhibition events only.

Rank	Nation	Gold	Silver	Bronze	Total
1	Germany	7	8	3	18
2	Belarus	7	0	0	7
3	Hungary	6	4	2	12
4	Spain	2	1	1	4
5	Russia	1	5	3	9
6	Azerbaijan	1	1	1	3
7	Poland	1	1	0	2
8	Lithuania	1	0	1	2
9	Uzbekistan	1	0	0	1
10	France	0	2	4	6
11	Sweden	0	2	1	3
12	Slovakia	0	1	2	3
13	Australia	0	1	1	2
14	Ukraine	0	1	0	1
15	Canada	0	0	3	3
16	Cuba	0	0	1	1
16	Italy	0	0	1	1
16	Portugal	0	0	1	1
16	Romania	0	0	1	1
16	South Africa	0	0	1	1
Totals (20 entries)		27	27	27	81

== See also ==
- Canoeing at the 2008 Summer Olympics
