= Hendrik Bertz =

German sprint canoer

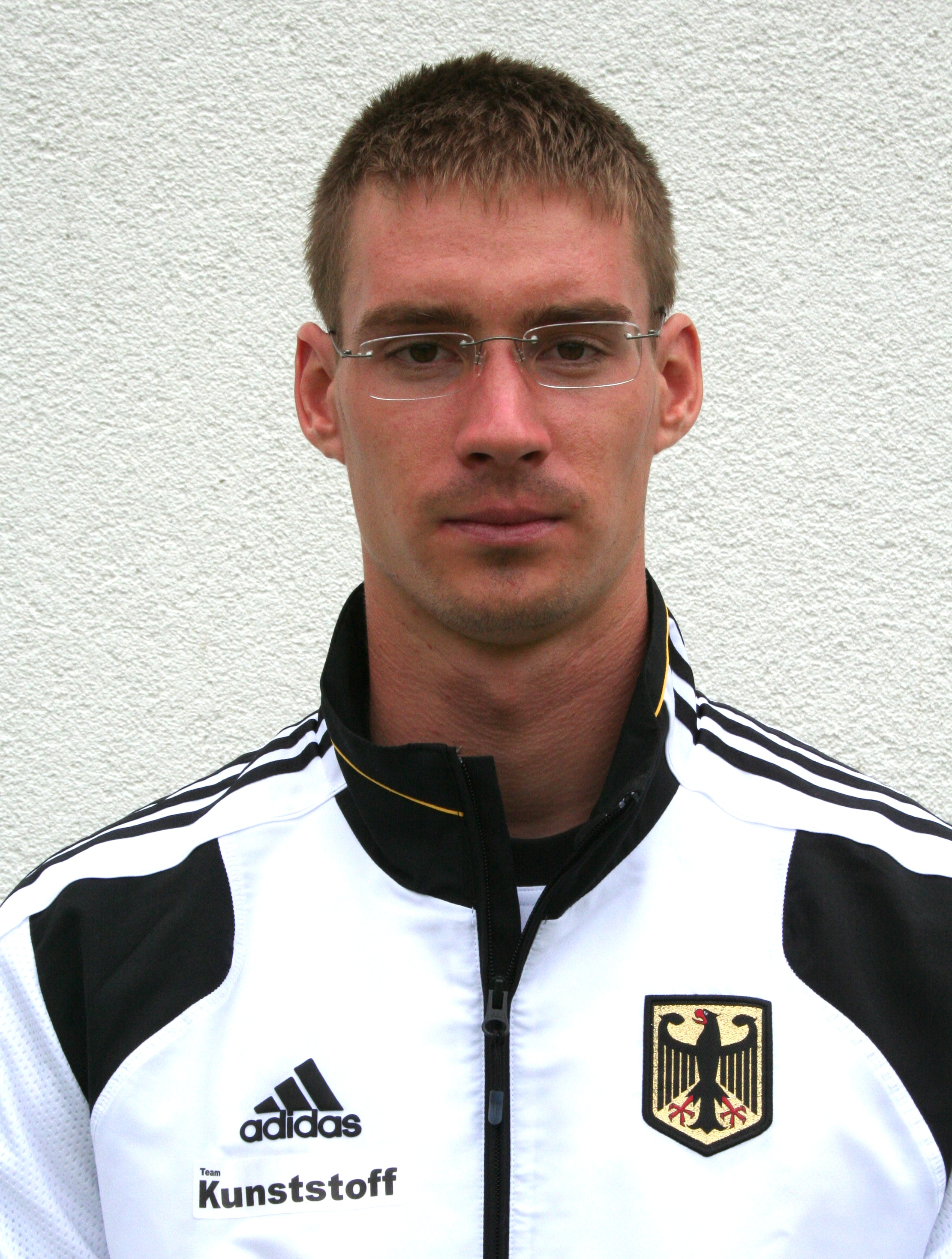
- Hendrick Bertz in 2009

Personal information
- Born: 21 September 1988 (age 37)
Medal record
Men's canoe sprint
World Championships
| Bronze medal – third place | 2009 Dartmouth | K-2 500 m |

Hendrik Bertz (born 21 September 1988) is a German sprint canoer who has competed since the late 2000s. He won a bronze medal in the K-2 500 m event at the 2009 ICF Canoe Sprint World Championships in Dartmouth.
