= Dzianis Harazha =

Belarusian sprint canoeist

Medal record

Men's sprint canoeing

Representing Belarus

World Championships
Gold medal – first place	2009 Dartmouth	C-1 500 m
Gold medal – first place	2009 Dartmouth	C-4 1000 m
Gold medal – first place	2010 Poznań	C-1 500 m
Gold medal – first place	2010 Poznań	C-4 1000 m
Gold medal – first place	2011 Szeged	C-4 1000 m
Silver medal – second place	2011 Szeged	C-1 500 m
Silver medal – second place	2013 Duisburg	C-4 1000 m
Silver medal – second place	2014 Moscow	C-4 1000 m

European Championships
Gold medal – first place	2012 Zagreb	C-4 1000 m
Gold medal – first place	2013 Montemor-o-Velho	C-4 1000 m
Gold medal – first place	2014 Brandenburg	C-4 1000 m
Silver medal – second place	2013 Montemor-o-Velho	C-1 500 m
Bronze medal – third place	2011 Belgrade	C-1 500 m
Bronze medal – third place	2014 Brandenburg	C-1 500 m

Dzianis Harazha, Belarusian: Дзяніс Гаража (born 15 May 1987) is a Belarusian sprint canoer who has competed since the late 2000s. He has won five gold medals at the ICF Canoe Sprint World Championships (C-1 500 m: 2009, 2010; C-4 1000 m: 2009, 2010, 2011).
