= Stefan Holtz =

German canoeist

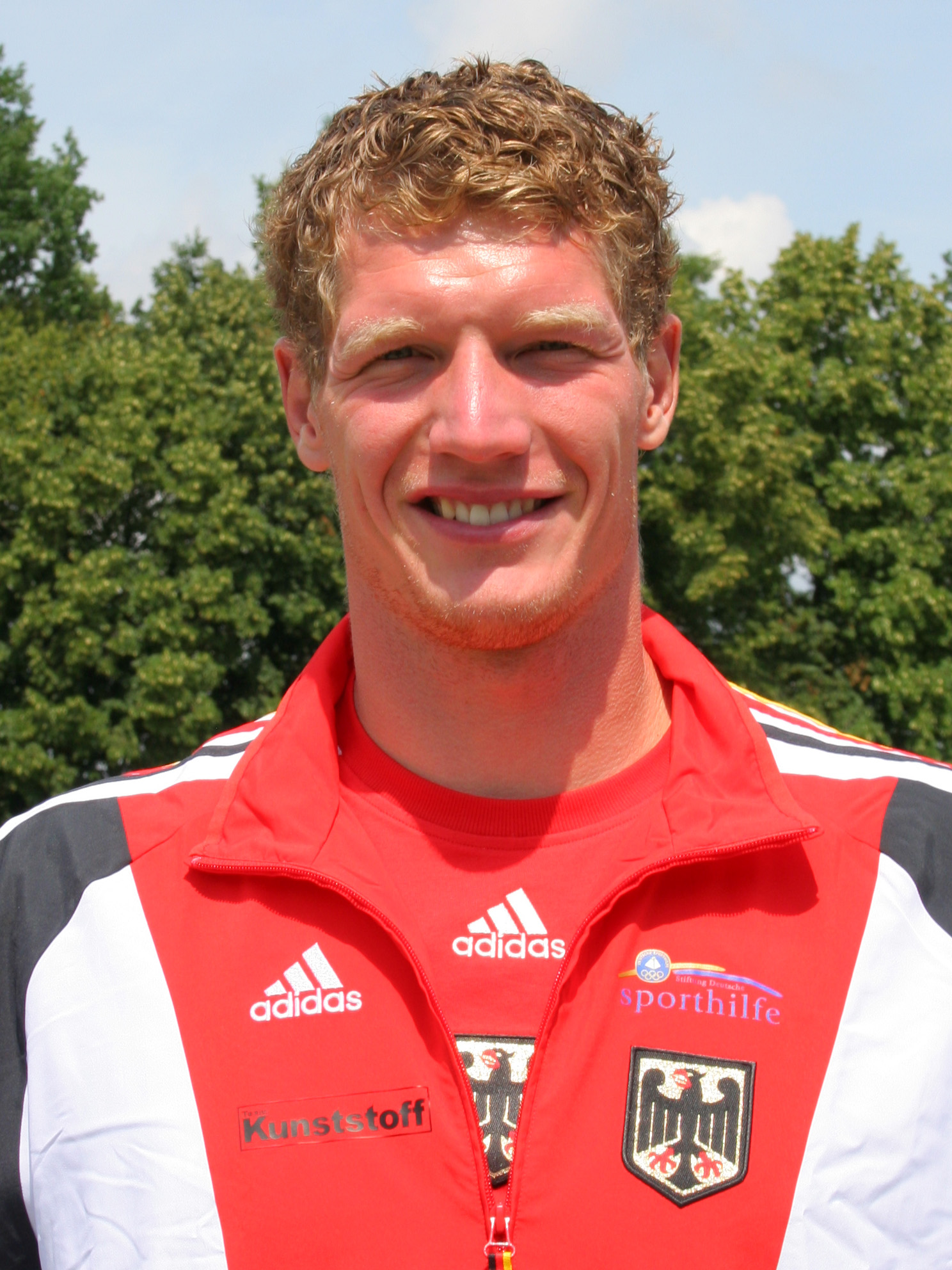

Personal information
- Born: 27 February 1981 (age 45)
Medal record
Men's canoe sprint
Representing Germany
World Championships
Gold medal – first place	2006 Szeged	C-4 1000 m
Gold medal – first place	2009 Dartmouth	C-2 500 m
Gold medal – first place	2011 Szeged	C-2 1000 m
Gold medal – first place	2013 Duisburg	C-2 200 m
Silver medal – second place	2006 Szeged	C-2 500 m
Silver medal – second place	2007 Duisburg	C-4 500 m
Silver medal – second place	2007 Duisburg	C-4 1000 m
Silver medal – second place	2013 Duisburg	4 x C–1 200 m
Silver medal – second place	2014 Moscow	C-2 200 m
Bronze medal – third place	2005 Zagreb	C-4 1000 m
Bronze medal – third place	2009 Dartmouth	C-2 200 m
Bronze medal – third place	2011 Szeged	C-1 4 x 200 m
Bronze medal – third place	2015 Milan	C-2 200 m
European Championships
Silver medal – second place	2014 Brandenburg	C-2 200 m
Bronze medal – third place	2013 Montemor-o-Velho	C-2 200 m

Stefan Holtz (born 27 February 1981) is a German sprint canoeist who has competed since 2004. He won seven medals at the ICF Canoe Sprint World Championships, including two golds (C-2 500 m: 2009, C-4 1000 m: 2006), three silvers (C-2 500 m: 2006, C-4 500 m: 2007, C-4 1000 m: 2007), and two bronzes (C-2 200 m: 2009, C-4 1000 m: 2005).
