= Ronald Verch =

German sprint canoeist (born 1986)

Medal record

Men's sprint canoeing

Representing Germany

World Championships
Gold medal – first place	2010 Poznań	C-1 5000 m
Silver medal – second place	2009 Dartmouth	C-4 1000 m
Bronze medal – third place	2010 Poznań	C-4 1000 m
Bronze medal – third place	2014 Moscow	C-2 1000 m

Ronald Verch (born 10 February 1986) is a German sprint canoeist who has been competing since the late 2000s. He won a complete set of medals at the ICF Canoe Sprint World Championships with a gold in the C-1 5000 m (2010), a silver in the C-4 1000 m (2009), and a bronze in the C-4 1000 m (2010).
