= Dziamyan Turchyn =

Belarusian canoeist

Medal record

Men's canoe sprint

Representing Belarus

World Championships
Gold medal – first place	2005 Zagreb	K-4 500 m
Gold medal – first place	2009 Dartmouth	K-4 200 m
Bronze medal – third place	2005 Zagreb	K-4 200 m
Bronze medal – third place	2006 Szeged	K-4 1000 m

Dziamyan Turchyn (alternate listings: Demian Turchin or Demyan Turchin, born 2 March 1985 in Minsk) is a Belarusian canoe sprinter.

At the Olympics the only K-4 race is over 1000 m and Reneysky dropped Skurkouski from the 1000 m line-up in favour of Turchyn. Belarus finished sixth in the Olympic final.

In 2006 they began with victories at the Poznan and Duisburg regattas. However, Reneysky then changed his strategy in preparation for the 2008 Summer Olympics. With only one K-4 event, the 1000 m, on the Olympic schedule, the K-4 crew would not be entered for the 500m at the European and World Championships. This strategy was logical in that it allowed Piatrushenka and Makhneu the necessary rest time to compete in the K-2 500 m.

At the European Championships in Račice, Czech Republic, Turchyn and his team-mates won a silver medal in the K-4 1000 m behind Slovakia. This was their best-ever result over 1000 m in a major championship. But their background as sprinters was demonstrated the following day as they took gold in the K-4 200 m.

At the 2006 World Championships, held in Szeged, Hungary, the Belarusian four claimed a bronze medal in the 1000 m final (this time behind hosts Hungary and Poland) – their first world championship medal over the Olympic distance.

Turchyn won a gold in the K-4 200 m event at the 2009 championships in Dartmouth.

Turchyn is 190 cm (6 ft 3 in) tall and weighs 90 kg (200 lb).
