= José Luis Bouza =

Spanish canoeist

Medal record

Men's canoe sprint

World Championships
| Silver medal – second place | 2010 Poznań | C-1 5000 m |
| Bronze medal – third place | 2011 Szeged | C-1 5000 m |

European Championships
| Bronze medal – third place | 2011 Belgrade | C-1 1000 m |

José Luis Bouza Pregal is a Spanish sprint canoer, who has been competing since the late 2000s. He won a silver medal in the C-1 5000 m event at the 2010 ICF Canoe Sprint World Championships in Poznań.
