= Chris Wend =

German sprint canoer (born 1987)

Medal record

Men's canoe sprint

World Championships
Silver medal – second place	2009 Dartmouth	C-4 1000 m
Bronze medal – third place	2010 Poznań	C-4 1000 m

Chris Wend (born 21 June 1987) is a German sprint canoeist who has been competing since the late 2000s. He won two medals in the C-4 1000 m event at the ICF Canoe Sprint World Championships with a silver in 2009 and a bronze in 2010.
