= Anders Gustafsson =

Swedish sprint canoeist

Personal information
- Full name: Anders Karl Gustaf Gustafsson
- Born: 7 April 1979 (age 47) Jönköping, Sweden
Medal record
Men's canoe sprint
Representing Sweden
World Championships
Gold medal – first place	2010 Poznań	K-1 500 m
Silver medal – second place	2009 Dartmouth	K-1 500 m
Silver medal – second place	2009 Dartmouth	K-1 1000 m
Silver medal – second place	2011 Szeged	K-1 1000 m
European Championships
Gold medal – first place	2012 Zagreb	K-1 500 m
Silver medal – second place	2011 Belgrade	K-1 500 m

Anders Karl Gustaf Gustafsson (born 7 April 1979 in Jönköping) is a Swedish sprint canoeist who has competed since the mid-2000s. He won four medals at the ICF Canoe Sprint World Championships with a gold (K-1 500 m: 2010) and three silvers (K-1 500 m, K-1 1000 m: both 2009); K-1 1000 m: 2011.

Gustafsson also competed in four Summer Olympics, earning his best finish of fifth in the K-1 1000 m event at London in 2012.

He is currently a member of Jönköpings Kanotklubb.

Gustafsson joined Artemis Racing for their 2017 America's Cup challenge.
