= Josefin Nordlöw =

Swedish canoeist (born 1982)

Medal record

Women's canoe sprint

World Championships
Bronze medal – third place	2006 Szeged	K-4 200 m
Bronze medal – third place	2009 Dartmouth	K-2 500 m

Josefin Nordlöw (born 1982) is a Swedish sprint canoer who competed in the late 2000s to 2010s. She won two bronze medals at the ICF Canoe Sprint World Championships (K-2 500 m: 2009, K-4 200 m: 2006).

Nordlöw's home club is Vårby IK in Örnsköldsvik.
