= László Foltán Jr. =

Hungarian canoeist

Medal record

Men's canoe sprint

World Championships
Silver medal – second place	2009 Dartmouth	C-1 4 x 200 m
Bronze medal – third place	2009 Dartmouth	C-4 200 m

László Foltán Jr. is a Hungarian sprint canoer who has competed since 2008. He won two medals at the 2009 ICF Canoe Sprint World Championships in Dartmouth with a silver in the C-1 4 × 200 m and a bronze in the C-4 200 m.
