= Anastasia Sergeeva =

Russian canoeist

Medal record

Women's canoe sprint

World Championships
Silver medal – second place	2010 Poznań	K-2 500 m
Silver medal – second place	2011 Szeged	K-1 4 x 200 m
Bronze medal – third place	2010 Poznań	K-1 4 x 200 m
Bronze medal – third place	2010 Poznań	K-2 1000 m

European Championships
Bronze medal – third place	2011 Belgrade	K-2 500 m
Bronze medal – third place	2011 Belgrade	K-2 1000 m

Anastasia Sergeeva (born February 6, 1987) is a Russian sprint canoer who has competed since the late 2000s. At the 2010 ICF Canoe Sprint World Championships in Poznań, she won three medals with a silver (K-2 500 m) and two bronzes (K-1 4 x 200 m, K-2 1000 m).
