= Carlos Pérez (canoeist) =

Spanish canoeist (born 1979)

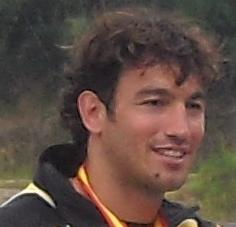
- Carlos Pérez at the 2009 ICF Canoe Sprint World Championships

Medal record

Representing Spain

Men's canoe sprint

Olympic Games
Gold medal – first place	2008 Beijing	K-2 500 m

World Championships
Gold medal – first place	2005 Zagreb	K-1 200 m
Gold medal – first place	2009 Dartmouth	K-1 4 x 200 m
Gold medal – first place	2010 Poznań	K-1 4 x 200 m
Gold medal – first place	2011 Szeged	K-1 4 x 200 m
Silver medal – second place	2003 Gainesville	K-1 500 m
Silver medal – second place	2006 Szeged	K-1 200 m
Silver medal – second place	2009 Dartmouth	K-2 200 m
Silver medal – second place	2010 Poznań	K-2 200 m

Mediterranean Games
Gold medal – first place	2013 Mersin	K-2 200 m
Silver medal – second place	2005 Almería	K-1 500 m

Carlos Pérez Rial (born 12 April 1979 in Cangas do Morrazo, Pontevedra), nicknamed "Perucho", is a Spanish sprint canoer who has been competing since 1999. Competing in two Summer Olympics, he won a gold in the K-2 500 m event at Beijing in 2008 along with Saul Craviotto.

Pérez won seven medals at the ICF Canoe Sprint World Championships with three golds (K-1 200 m: 2005, K-1 4 × 200 m: 2009, 2010) and four silvers (K-1 200 m: 2006, K-1 500 m: 2003, K-2 200 m: 2009, 2010).

Perucho is a member of the Piragüismo Aldán club. He is 182 cm (6 ft 0 in) tall and weighs 84 kg (185 lb).

== European Championship Medals ==
- Silver K-1 200 m 2006 Račice, Czech Republic 0:34.644
- Gold K-1 200 m 2005 Poznań, Poland 0:36.098
- Bronze K-1 500 m 2004 Poznań, Poland 1:41.974
