= 2018 ICF Canoe Sprint World Championships – Men's C-1 5000 metres =

Men's C-1 5000 metres at the 2018 ICF Canoe Sprint World Championships
- Venue: Centro de Alto Rendimento de Montemor-o-Velho
- Location: Montemor-o-Velho, Portugal
- Dates: 26 August
- Competitors: 19 from 19 nations
- Winning time: 23:40.857

Medalists
gold medal	Sebastian Brendel	Germany
silver medal	Fernando Enriquez	Cuba
bronze medal	Kirill Shamshurin	Russia

The men's C-1 5000 metres competition at the 2018 ICF Canoe Sprint World Championships in Montemor-o-Velho took place at the Centro de Alto Rendimento de Montemor-o-Velho.

== Schedule ==
The schedule was as follows:

Date	Time	Round
Sunday 26 August 2018	15:40	Final

All times are Western European Summer Time (UTC+1)

== Results ==
As a long-distance event, it was held as a direct final.

Rank	Canoeist	Country	Time
1st place, gold medalist(s)	Sebastian Brendel	Germany	23:40.857
2nd place, silver medalist(s)	Fernando Jorge	Cuba	23:46.646
3rd place, bronze medalist(s)	Kirill Shamshurin	Russia	24:09.504
4	Mateusz Kamiński	Poland	24:25.916
5	Carlo Tacchini	Italy	24:31.263
6	Manuel Campos	Spain	24:32.367
7	Thomas Simart	France	25:02.871
8	Aivis Tints	Latvia	25:04.850
9	Rui Lacerda	Portugal	25:06.489
10	Ilya Palonski	Belarus	25:22.358
11	Joosep Karlson	Estonia	25:37.886
12	Mark Oldershaw	Canada	25:51.003
13	Filip Dvořák	Czech Republic	26:08.611
14	Eduard Shemetylo	Ukraine	26:12.116
15	Ian Ross	United States	26:29.481
16	Takayuki Kokaji	Japan	26:30.929
17	Ghailene Khattali	Tunisia	27:06.032
–	Oleg Tarnovschi	Moldova	DNF
–	Tamás Kiss	Hungary	DSQ
