= 2018 ICF Canoe Sprint World Championships – Men's C-1 500 metres =

Men's C-1 500 metres at the 2018 ICF Canoe Sprint World Championships
- Venue: Centro de Alto Rendimento de Montemor-o-Velho
- Location: Montemor-o-Velho, Portugal
- Dates: 23–24 August
- Competitors: 23 from 23 nations
- Winning time: 1:49.203

Medalists
gold medal	Isaquias Queiroz	Brazil
silver medal	Sebastian Brendel	Germany
bronze medal	Martin Fuksa	Czech Republic

The men's C-1 500 metres competition at the 2018 ICF Canoe Sprint World Championships in Montemor-o-Velho took place at the Centro de Alto Rendimento de Montemor-o-Velho.

== Schedule ==
The schedule was as follows:

Date	Time	Round
Thursday 23 August 2018	11:41	Heats
Friday 24 August 2018	11:20	Semifinals
Friday 24 August 2018	16:31	Final A
Friday 24 August 2018	17:11	Final B

All times are Western European Summer Time (UTC+1)

== Results ==
=== Heats ===
Heat winners advanced directly to the A final. The next six fastest boats in each heat advanced to the semifinals.

==== Heat 1 ====
Rank	Canoeist	Country	Time	Notes
1	Martin Fuksa	Czech Republic	1:49.025	QA
2	Oleg Tarnovschi	Moldova	1:49.290	QS
3	Mikhail Pavlov	Russia	1:50.235	QS
4	Stefan Strat	Romania	1:53.240	QS
5	Ryo Naganuma	Japan	1:53.585	QS
6	Angel Kodinov	Bulgaria	1:56.925	QS
7	Joosep Karlson	Estonia	1:59.005	QS
8	Ghailene Khattali	Tunisia	1:59.885	

==== Heat 2 ====
Rank	Canoeist	Country	Time	Notes
1	Isaquias Queiroz	Brazil	1:50.589	QA
2	Tamás Kiss	Hungary	1:52.684	QS
3	Sebastian Brendel	Germany	1:52.984	QS
4	Pavlo Altukhov	Ukraine	1:54.435	QS
5	Carlo Tacchini	Italy	1:54.595	QS
6	Ian Ross	United States	2:02.480	QS
7	Dagnis Iļjins	Latvia	2:07.080	QS

==== Heat 3 ====
Rank	Canoeist	Country	Time	Notes
1	Thomas Simart	France	1:49.564	QA
2	Maksim Piatrou	Belarus	1:50.389	QS
3	Tomasz Kaczor	Poland	1:51.079	QS
4	Craig Spence	Canada	1:51.929	QS
5	David Fernández	Spain	1:52.574	QS
6	Matej Rusnák	Slovakia	1:53.185	QS
7	Hélder Silva	Portugal	1:57.385	QS
8	Joaquim Lobo	Mozambique	2:15.251	

=== Semifinals ===
Qualification was as follows:

The fastest three boats in each semi advanced to the A final.
The next four fastest boats in each semi, plus the fastest remaining boat advanced to the B final.

==== Semifinal 1 ====
Rank	Canoeist	Country	Time	Notes
1	Sebastian Brendel	Germany	1:50.692	QA
2	Oleg Tarnovschi	Moldova	1:52.027	QA
3	Tomasz Kaczor	Poland	1:52.447	QA
4	Carlo Tacchini	Italy	1:52.477	QB
5	Angel Kodinov	Bulgaria	1:54.187	QB
6	Craig Spence	Canada	1:54.822	QB
7	Matej Rusnák	Slovakia	1:55.427	QB
8	Stefan Strat	Romania	1:58.447	qB
9	Dagnis Iļjins	Latvia	2:09.918	

==== Semifinal 2 ====
Rank	Canoeist	Country	Time	Notes
1	Mikhail Pavlov	Russia	1:51.918	QA
2	Maksim Piatrou	Belarus	1:52.098	QA
3	Tamás Kiss	Hungary	1:53.399	QA
4	Hélder Silva	Portugal	1:54.349	QB
5	Pavlo Altukhov	Ukraine	1:54.349	QB
6	David Fernández	Spain	1:55.134	QB
7	Ryo Naganuma	Japan	1:55.429	QB
8	Ian Ross	United States	1:58.474	
9	Joosep Karlson	Estonia	2:00.949	

=== Finals ===
==== Final B ====
Competitors in this final raced for positions 10 to 18.

Rank	Canoeist	Country	Time
1	Carlo Tacchini	Italy	1:52.676
2	Angel Kodinov	Bulgaria	1:53.386
3	Matej Rusnák	Slovakia	1:54.053
4	David Fernández	Spain	1:54.156
5	Craig Spence	Canada	1:54.813
6	Pavlo Altukhov	Ukraine	1:55.073
7	Ryo Naganuma	Japan	1:57.063
8	Hélder Silva	Portugal	2:05.887
9	Stefan Strat	Romania	2:15.024

==== Final A ====
Competitors in this final raced for positions 1 to 9, with medals going to the top three.

Rank	Canoeist	Country	Time
1st place, gold medalist(s)	Isaquias Queiroz	Brazil	1:49.203
2nd place, silver medalist(s)	Sebastian Brendel	Germany	1:49.496
3rd place, bronze medalist(s)	Martin Fuksa	Czech Republic	1:50.143
4	Oleg Tarnovschi	Moldova	1:51.577
5	Maksim Piatrou	Belarus	1:51.823
6	Tomasz Kaczor	Poland	1:52.643
7	Mikhail Pavlov	Russia	1:52.743
8	Tamás Kiss	Hungary	1:56.217
9	Thomas Simart	France	2:02.734
