= 2017 ICF Canoe Sprint World Championships – Men's C-1 5000 metres =

Men's C-1 5000 metres at the 2017 ICF Canoe Sprint World Championships
- Venue: Sportcentrum Račice
- Location: Račice, Czech Republic
- Dates: 27 August
- Competitors: 26 from 26 nations
- Winning time: 23:34.796

Medalists
gold medal	Sebastian Brendel	Germany
silver medal	Serguey Torres	Cuba
bronze medal	Mateusz Kamiński	Poland

The men's C-1 5000 metres competition at the 2017 ICF Canoe Sprint World Championships in Račice took place at the Sportcentrum Račice.

== Schedule ==
The schedule was as follows:

Date	Time	Round
Sunday 27 August 2017	14:30	Final

All times are Central European Summer Time (UTC+2)

== Results ==
As a long-distance event, it was held as a direct final.

Rank	Canoeist	Country	Time
1st place, gold medalist(s)	Sebastian Brendel	Germany	23:34.796
2nd place, silver medalist(s)	Serguey Torres	Cuba	23:37.312
3rd place, bronze medalist(s)	Mateusz Kamiński	Poland	23:42.522
4	Carlo Tacchini	Italy	23:45.017
5	Kirill Shamshurin	Russia	24:08.738
6	Dávid Varga	Hungary	24:20.712
7	Filip Dvořák	Czech Republic	24:35.485
8	Kia Eskandani	Iran	24:46.259
9	Eduard Shemetylo	Ukraine	24:50.170
10	Aivis Tints	Latvia	24:54.022
11	Vincent Farkaš	Slovakia	25:16.275
12	Nurislom Tukhtasin Ugli	Uzbekistan	25:19.070
13	Mohssine Moutahir	Spain	25:39.843
14	Mark Oldershaw	Canada	25:44.338
15	Stefanos Dimopoulos	Greece	25:44.338
16	Bruno Kumpez	Croatia	25:52.306
17	Everardo Cristóbal	Mexico	25:57.312
18	Takanori Tome	Japan	26:22.222
19	Joosep Karlson	Estonia	26:33.538
20	Cătălin Chirilă	Romania	26:49.585
21	Anwar Tarra	Indonesia	27:14.043
22	Gaurav Tomar	India	27:46.017
–	Chou En-Ping	Chinese Taipei	DNF
–	Maksim Piatrou	Belarus	DNF
–	Daniel Leon	Ecuador	DNS
–	Oleg Tarnovschi	Moldova	DNS
