= 2017 ICF Canoe Sprint World Championships – Men's C-1 1000 metres =

Men's C-1 1000 metres at the 2017 ICF Canoe Sprint World Championships
- Venue: Sportcentrum Račice
- Location: Račice, Czech Republic
- Dates: 24–26 August
- Competitors: 27 from 27 nations
- Winning time: 3:50.503

Medalists
| gold medal | Sebastian Brendel | Germany |
| silver medal | Martin Fuksa | Czech Republic |
| bronze medal | Isaquias Queiroz | Brazil |

The men's C-1 1000 metres competition at the 2017 ICF Canoe Sprint World Championships in Račice took place at the Sportcentrum Račice.

== Schedule ==
The schedule was as follows:

| Date | Time | Round |
|---|---|---|
| Thursday 24 August 2017 | 10:03 | Heats |
| Thursday 24 August 2017 | 16:38 | Semifinals |
| Saturday 26 August 2017 | 09:39 | Final B |
| Saturday 26 August 2017 | 11:08 | Final A |

All times are Central European Summer Time (UTC+2)

== Results ==
=== Heats ===
Heat winners advanced directly to the A final. The next six fastest boats in each heat advanced to the semifinals.

==== Heat 1 ====
| Rank | Canoeist | Country | Time | Notes |
|---|---|---|---|---|
| 1 | Sebastian Brendel | Germany | 3:58.788 | QA |
| 2 | Maksim Piatrou | Belarus | 4:00.049 | QS |
| 3 | Henrik Vasbányai | Hungary | 4:00.166 | QS |
| 4 | Matej Rusnák | Slovakia | 4:03.572 | QS |
| 5 | Tomasz Kaczor | Poland | 4:03.716 | QS |
| 6 | Daniel Durán | Spain | 4:05.449 | QS |
| 7 | Vadim Korobov | Lithuania | 4:07.122 | QS |
| 8 | Joosep Karlson | Estonia | 4:34.016 | |
| – | Takanori Tome | Japan | DNS | |

==== Heat 2 ====
| Rank | Canoeist | Country | Time | Notes |
|---|---|---|---|---|
| 1 | Martin Fuksa | Czech Republic | 3:52.192 | QA |
| 2 | Isaquias Queiroz | Brazil | 3:54.125 | QS |
| 3 | Carlo Tacchini | Italy | 4:00.930 | QS |
| 4 | Kirill Shamshurin | Russia | 4:02.669 | QS |
| 5 | Adrien Bart | France | 4:02.680 | QS |
| 6 | Everardo Cristóbal | Mexico | 4:06.453 | QS |
| 7 | Aivis Tints | Latvia | 4:06.558 | QS |
| 8 | Choi Jisung | South Korea | 4:12.942 | |
| 9 | Gaurav Tomar | India | 4:29.530 | |

==== Heat 3 ====
| Rank | Canoeist | Country | Time | Notes |
|---|---|---|---|---|
| 1 | Nurislom Tukhtasin Ugli | Uzbekistan | 4:01.008 | QA |
| 2 | Yurii Vandiuk | Ukraine | 4:04.030 | QS |
| 3 | Kia Eskandani | Iran | 4:06.030 | QS |
| 4 | Craig Spence | Canada | 4:06.286 | QS |
| 5 | Angel Kodinov | Bulgaria | 4:09.169 | QS |
| 6 | Stefanos Dimopoulos | Greece | 4:11.208 | QS |
| 7 | Bruno Kumpez | Croatia | 4:12.991 | QS |
| 8 | Chou En-Ping | Chinese Taipei | 4:19.797 | |
| – | Oleg Tarnovschi | Moldova | DNS | |

=== Semifinals ===
Qualification was as follows:

The fastest three boats in each semi advanced to the A final.
The next four fastest boats in each semi, plus the fastest remaining boat advanced to the B final.

==== Semifinal 1 ====
| Rank | Canoeist | Country | Time | Notes |
|---|---|---|---|---|
| 1 | Carlo Tacchini | Italy | 3:58.146 | QA |
| 2 | Kirill Shamshurin | Russia | 3:59.012 | QA |
| 3 | Tomasz Kaczor | Poland | 4:00.429 | QA |
| 4 | Henrik Vasbányai | Hungary | 4:00.724 | QB |
| 5 | Yurii Vandiuk | Ukraine | 4:02.696 | QB |
| 6 | Everardo Cristóbal | Mexico | 4:03.662 | QB |
| 7 | Daniel Durán | Spain | 4:04.262 | QB |
| 8 | Craig Spence | Canada | 4:11.518 | |
| 9 | Bruno Kumpez | Croatia | 4:16.235 | |

==== Semifinal 2 ====
| Rank | Canoeist | Country | Time | Notes |
|---|---|---|---|---|
| 1 | Isaquias Queiroz | Brazil | 3:57.612 | QA |
| 2 | Maksim Piatrou | Belarus | 3:59.812 | QA |
| 3 | Adrien Bart | France | 4:01.012 | QA |
| 4 | Vadim Korobov | Lithuania | 4:01.423 | QB |
| 5 | Matej Rusnák | Slovakia | 4:02.167 | QB |
| 6 | Stefanos Dimopoulos | Greece | 4:02.862 | QB |
| 7 | Kia Eskandani | Iran | 4:06.156 | QB |
| 8 | Aivis Tints | Latvia | 4:06.251 | qB |
| 9 | Angel Kodinov | Bulgaria | 4:31.317 | |

=== Finals ===
==== Final B ====
Competitors in this final raced for positions 10 to 18.

| Rank | Canoeist | Country | Time |
|---|---|---|---|
| 1 | Henrik Vasbányai | Hungary | 3:59.867 |
| 2 | Matej Rusnák | Slovakia | 4:01.273 |
| 3 | Vadim Korobov | Lithuania | 4:01.473 |
| 4 | Everardo Cristóbal | Mexico | 4:02.095 |
| 5 | Yurii Vandiuk | Ukraine | 4:02.245 |
| 6 | Daniel Durán | Spain | 4:02.839 |
| 7 | Stefanos Dimopoulos | Greece | 4:03.056 |
| 8 | Aivis Tints | Latvia | 4:03.684 |
| 9 | Kia Eskandani | Iran | 4:05.767 |

==== Final A ====
Competitors in this final raced for positions 1 to 9, with medals going to the top three.

| Rank | Canoeist | Country | Time |
|---|---|---|---|
| 1st place, gold medalist(s) | Sebastian Brendel | Germany | 3:50.503 |
| 2nd place, silver medalist(s) | Martin Fuksa | Czech Republic | 3:51.303 |
| 3rd place, bronze medalist(s) | Isaquias Queiroz | Brazil | 3:52.542 |
| 4 | Carlo Tacchini | Italy | 3:53.103 |
| 5 | Tomasz Kaczor | Poland | 3:55.203 |
| 6 | Maksim Piatrou | Belarus | 3:55.475 |
| 7 | Kirill Shamshurin | Russia | 3:57.103 |
| 8 | Adrien Bart | France | 3:57.370 |
| 9 | Nurislom Tukhtasin Ugli | Uzbekistan | 4:05.697 |
