= 2018 ICF Canoe Sprint World Championships – Men's C-1 1000 metres =

Men's C-1 1000 metres at the 2018 ICF Canoe Sprint World Championships
- Venue: Centro de Alto Rendimento de Montemor-o-Velho
- Location: Montemor-o-Velho, Portugal
- Dates: 23–25 August
- Competitors: 25 from 25 nations
- Winning time: 3:48.390

Medalists
gold medal	Sebastian Brendel	Germany
silver medal	Martin Fuksa	Czech Republic
bronze medal	Isaquias Queiroz	Brazil

The men's C-1 1000 metres competition at the 2018 ICF Canoe Sprint World Championships in Montemor-o-Velho took place at the Centro de Alto Rendimento de Montemor-o-Velho.

== Schedule ==
The schedule was as follows:

Date	Time	Round
Thursday 23 August 2018	15:00	Heats
Saturday 25 August 2018	10:12	Semifinals
Saturday 25 August 2018	11:45	Final B
Saturday 25 August 2018	12:11	Final A

All times are Western European Summer Time (UTC+1)

== Results ==
=== Heats ===
Heat winners advanced directly to the A final. The next six fastest boats in each heat advanced to the semifinals.

==== Heat 1 ====
Rank	Canoeist	Country	Time	Notes
1	Sebastian Brendel	Germany	4:17.098	QA
2	Oleg Tarnovschi	Moldova	4:18.673	QS
3	Mark Oldershaw	Canada	4:18.928	QS
4	Kirill Shamshurin	Russia	4:18.948	QS
5	Maksim Piatrou	Belarus	4:18.963	QS
6	Gonzalo Martín	Spain	4:21.478	QS
7	Pavlo Altukhov	Ukraine	4:23.468	QS
8	Ian Ross	United States	4:26.783	
9	Malkhaz Tchintcharashvili	Georgia	4:39.269	

==== Heat 2 ====
Rank	Canoeist	Country	Time	Notes
1	Martin Fuksa	Czech Republic	4:13.321	QA
2	Adrien Bart	France	4:13.916	QS
3	Wiktor Głazunow	Poland	4:19.381	QS
4	Vadim Korobov	Lithuania	4:22.766	QS
5	Roberts Lagzdins	Latvia	4:23.036	QS
6	Ryo Naganuma	Japan	4:24.826	QS
7	Angel Kodinov	Bulgaria	4:26.546	QS
8	Joosep Karlson	Estonia	4:32.422	

==== Heat 3 ====
Rank	Canoeist	Country	Time	Notes
1	Isaquias Queiroz	Brazil	4:10.934	QA
2	András Bodonyi	Hungary	4:12.484	QS
3	Carlo Tacchini	Italy	4:23.290	QS
4	Cătălin Chirilă	Romania	4:29.190	QS
5	Matej Rusnák	Slovakia	4:30.480	QS
6	Fábio Lopes	Portugal	4:32.745	QS
7	Ghailene Khattali	Tunisia	4:47.131	QS
8	Joaquim Lobo	Mozambique	5:24.248	

=== Semifinals ===
Qualification was as follows:

The fastest three boats in each semi advanced to the A final.
The next four fastest boats in each semi, plus the fastest remaining boat advanced to the B final.

==== Semifinal 1 ====
Rank	Canoeist	Country	Time	Notes
1	Oleg Tarnovschi	Moldova	3:51.667	QA
2	Kirill Shamshurin	Russia	3:51.912	QA
3	Carlo Tacchini	Italy	3:52.947	QA
4	Wiktor Głazunow	Poland	3:54.217	QB
5	Gonzalo Martín	Spain	3:59.912	QB
6	Roberts Lagzdins	Latvia	4:01.567	QB
7	Angel Kodinov	Bulgaria	4:02.162	QB
8	Fábio Lopes	Portugal	4:07.743	
9	Cătălin Chirilă	Romania	4:38.769	

==== Semifinal 2 ====
Rank	Canoeist	Country	Time	Notes
1	Adrien Bart	France	3:53.242	QA
2	András Bodonyi	Hungary	3:53.312	QA
3	Mark Oldershaw	Canada	3:54.007	QA
4	Pavlo Altukhov	Ukraine	3:54.253	QB
5	Matej Rusnák	Slovakia	3:55.963	QB
6	Vadim Korobov	Lithuania	3:56.473	QB
7	Maksim Piatrou	Belarus	4:02.543	QB
8	Ryo Naganuma	Japan	4:03.508	qB
9	Ghailene Khattali	Tunisia	4:21.139	

=== Finals ===
==== Final B ====
Competitors in this final raced for positions 10 to 18.

Rank	Canoeist	Country	Time
1	Maksim Piatrou	Belarus	3:58.619
2	Matej Rusnák	Slovakia	3:59.989
3	Vadim Korobov	Lithuania	4:00.144
4	Gonzalo Martín	Spain	4:00.469
5	Roberts Lagzdins	Latvia	4:01.214
6	Pavlo Altukhov	Ukraine	4:02.179
7	Wiktor Głazunow	Poland	4:02.694
8	Angel Kodinov	Bulgaria	4:06.099
9	Ryo Naganuma	Japan	4:06.549

==== Final A ====
Competitors in this final raced for positions 1 to 9, with medals going to the top three.

Rank	Canoeist	Country	Time
1st place, gold medalist(s)	Sebastian Brendel	Germany	3:48.390
2nd place, silver medalist(s)	Martin Fuksa	Czech Republic	3:49.625
3rd place, bronze medalist(s)	Isaquias Queiroz	Brazil	3:50.190
4	Kirill Shamshurin	Russia	3:53.300
5	Oleg Tarnovschi	Moldova	3:53.665
6	Adrien Bart	France	3:54.221
7	András Bodonyi	Hungary	3:54.496
8	Carlo Tacchini	Italy	3:58.826
9	Mark Oldershaw	Canada	3:59.186
