= Canoe sprint at the 2019 European Games – Men's C-1 1000 metres =

Men's C-1 1000 metres at the 2019 European Games
- Venue: Zaslavl Regatta Course
- Date: 25–26 June
- Competitors: 18 from 18 nations
- Winning time: 3:57.953

Medalists
gold medal	Tomasz Kaczor	Poland
silver medal	Kirill Shamshurin	Russia
bronze medal	Sebastian Brendel	Germany

The men's C-1 1000 metres canoe sprint competition at the 2019 European Games in Minsk took place between 25 and 26 June at the Zaslavl Regatta Course.

== Schedule ==
The schedule was as follows:

Date	Time	Round
Tuesday 25 June 2019	09:21	Heats
Tuesday 25 June 2019	15:44	Semifinal
Wednesday 26 June 2019	10:20	Final

All times are Further-eastern European Time (UTC+3)

== Results ==
=== Heats ===
The fastest three boats in each heat advanced directly to the final. The next four fastest boats in each heat, plus the fastest remaining boat advanced to the semifinal.

==== Heat 1 ====
Rank	Canoeist	Country	Time	Notes
1	Martin Fuksa	Czech Republic	3:50.453	QF
2	Maksim Piatrou	Belarus	3:51.446	QF
3	Adrien Bart	France	3:51.483	QF
4	Tamás Kiss	Hungary	3:52.968	QS
5	Matej Rusnák	Slovakia	3:56.461	QS
6	Angel Kodinov	Bulgaria	3:58.653	QS
7	Oleg Tarnovschi	Moldova	4:08.746	QS
8	Stefanos Dimopoulos	Greece	4:13.888	
–	David Barreiro	Spain	DSQ	

==== Heat 2 ====
Rank	Canoeist	Country	Time	Notes
1	Tomasz Kaczor	Poland	3:48.829	QF
2	Carlo Tacchini	Italy	3:49.031	QF
3	Sebastian Brendel	Germany	3:49.341	QF
4	Kirill Shamshurin	Russia	3:49.784	QS
5	Vadim Korobov	Lithuania	3:56.949	QS
6	Dmytro Ianchuk	Ukraine	3:58.929	QS
7	Roberts Lagzdiņš	Latvia	3:59.256	QS
8	Joosep Karlson	Estonia	4:00.066	qS
9	Leonid Carp	Romania	4:00.326	

=== Semifinal ===
The fastest three boats advanced to the final.

Rank	Canoeist	Country	Time	Notes
1	Kirill Shamshurin	Russia	3:48.374	QF
2	Vadim Korobov	Lithuania	3:49.412	QF
3	Tamás Kiss	Hungary	3:49.487	QF
4	Oleg Tarnovschi	Moldova	3:49.524	
5	Matej Rusnák	Slovakia	3:50.989	
6	Dmytro Ianchuk	Ukraine	3:51.019	
7	Angel Kodinov	Bulgaria	3:51.552	
8	Roberts Lagzdiņš	Latvia	3:57.972	
9	Joosep Karlson	Estonia	4:03.934	

=== Final ===
Competitors in this final raced for positions 1 to 9, with medals going to the top three.

Rank	Canoeist	Country	Time
1st place, gold medalist(s)	Tomasz Kaczor	Poland	3:57.953
2nd place, silver medalist(s)	Kirill Shamshurin	Russia	3:58.028
3rd place, bronze medalist(s)	Sebastian Brendel	Germany	3:59.278
4	Maksim Piatrou	Belarus	4:03.506
5	Carlo Tacchini	Italy	4:03.776
6	Tamás Kiss	Hungary	4:07.343
7	Adrien Bart	France	4:12.728
8	Vadim Korobov	Lithuania	4:13.583
9	Martin Fuksa	Czech Republic	4:20.631
