= Canoeing at the 2013 Summer Universiade =

Canoeing at the XXVII Summer Universiade
- Venue: Rowing Centre
- Dates: July 13, 2013 – July 15, 2013

Canoeing was contested at the 2013 Summer Universiade from July 13 to 15 at the Rowing Centre in Kazan, Russia. Canoe sprint was the only discipline of canoeing contested.

== Medal summary ==
=== Medal table ===
Rank	Nation	Gold	Silver	Bronze	Total
1	Russia (RUS)	10	6	5	21
2	Belarus (BLR)	6	4	4	14
3	Lithuania (LTU)	3	0	0	3
4	Portugal (POR)	2	0	0	2
5	Poland (POL)	1	3	8	12
6	Ukraine (UKR)	1	2	0	3
7	Hungary (HUN)	1	0	2	3
8	Czech Republic (CZE)	0	3	1	4
9	Kazakhstan (KAZ)	0	2	0	2
10	Serbia (SRB)	0	1	3	4
11	Germany (GER)	0	1	0	1
11	Italy (ITA)	0	1	0	1
11	Slovakia (SVK)	0	1	0	1
14	Spain (ESP)	0	0	1	1
14	Uzbekistan (UZB)	0	0	1	1
Totals (15 entries)		24	24	25	73

=== Men's events ===
Event	Gold	Silver	Bronze
C1 200 m	Jevgenij Shuklin; Lithuania	Andrey Kraitor; Russia	Artsem Kozyr; Belarus
C1 500 m	Jevgenij Shuklin; Lithuania	Sergey Yemelyanov; Kazakhstan	Andrei Bahdanovich; Belarus
C1 1000 m	Tamás Kiss; Hungary	Sergey Yemelyanov; Kazakhstan	Ilia Shtokalov; Russia
C2 200 m	Russia (RUS); Viktor Melantev; Ivan Shtyl	Czech Republic (CZE); Jaroslav Radoň; Filip Dvořák	Belarus (BLR); Hleb Saladukha; Dzianis Makhlai
C2 500 m	Russia (RUS); Viktor Melantev; Ivan Shtyl	Czech Republic (CZE); Jaroslav Radoň; Filip Dvořák	Poland (POL); Tomasz Kaczor; Vincent Slominski
C2 1000 m	Russia (RUS); Viktor Melantev; Ilya Pervukhin	Czech Republic (CZE); Jaroslav Radoň; Filip Dvořák	Poland (POL); Tomasz Kaczor; Vincent Slominski
C4 200 m	Russia (RUS); Kirill Shamshurin; Andrey Kraitor; Alexander Kovalenko; Nikolay Lipkin	Belarus (BLR); Siarhei Pryvolkin; Dzianis Reut; Andrei Bahdanovich; Dzmitry Pivavar	Czech Republic (CZE); Vojtech Ruso; Dan Drahokoupil; Tomáš Janda; Radek Miskovsky
C4 500 m	Russia (RUS); Kirill Shamshurin; Mikhail Pavlov; Pavel Petrov; Alexey Bovdurets	Ukraine (UKR); Vitaliy Vergeles; Denys Kamerylov; Dmytro Ianchuk; Eduard Shemetylo	Uzbekistan (UZB); Ildar Kayumov; Mirziyodjon Khojiev; Dilshod Yuldashov; Muradjon Azmetov
C4 1000 m	Ukraine (UKR); Vitaliy Vergeles; Denys Kamerylov; Dmytro Ianchuk; Eduard Shemetylo	Russia (RUS); Kirill Shamshurin; Rasul Ishmukhamedov; Pavel Petrov; Vladimir Fedosenko	Poland (POL); Piotr Kuleta; Michal Kudla; Mateusz Kamiński; Patryk Skol
K1 200 m	Ignas Navakauskas; Lithuania	Manfredi Rizza; Italy	Oleg Kharitonov; Russia
K1 500 m	Fernando Pimenta; Portugal	Martin Schubert; Germany	Victor Andrushkin; Russia
K1 1000 m	Fernando Pimenta; Portugal	Aleh Yurenia; Belarus	Rafal Rosolski; Poland
K2 200 m	Russia (RUS); Yury Postrigay; Alexander Dyachenko	Slovakia (SVK); Miroslav Zaťko; Ľubomír Beňo	Poland (POL); Sebastian Szypula; Dawid Putto
K2 500 m	Belarus (BLR); Dzianis Zhyhadia; Vitaliy Bialko	Poland (POL); Pawel Szandrach; Mariusz Kujawski	Russia (RUS); Evgenii Lukantcov; Dmitry Gudimov
K2 1000 m	Poland (POL); Pawel Szandrach; Mariusz Kujawski	Russia (RUS); Vitaly Yurchenko; Vasily Pogreban	Hungary (HUN); Mate Petrovics; Gergely Császár
K4 200 m	Russia (RUS); Kirill Lyapunov; Aleksandr Nikolaev; Artem Kononyuk; Oleg Kharitonov	Ukraine (UKR); Ievgen Karabuta; Maksym Bilchenko; Oleksandr Senkevych; Igor Trunov	Poland (POL); Sebastian Szypula; Denis Ambroziak; Bartosz Stabno; Dawid Putto
K4 500 m	Russia (RUS); Kirill Lyapunov; Aleksandr Sergeev; Victor Andryushkin; Oleg Zhestkov	Belarus (BLR); Pavel Miadzvedzeu; Dzianis Zhyhadia; Artur Litvinchuk; Vitaliy Bialko	Poland (POL); Pawel Szandrach; Mariusz Kujawski; Sebastian Szypula; Dawid Putto
K4 1000 m	Russia (RUS); Oleg Zhestkov; Maxim Spesivtsev; Aleksei Vostrikov; Nikolay Chervov	Poland (POL); Pawel Florczak; Rafal Rosolski; Martin Brzezinski; Bartosz Stabno	Belarus (BLR); Pavel Miadzvedzeu; Ivan Tsuranau; Aleh Yurenia; Artur Litvinchuk
K4 1000 m	Russia (RUS); Oleg Zhestkov; Maxim Spesivtsev; Aleksei Vostrikov; Nikolay Chervov	Poland (POL); Pawel Florczak; Rafal Rosolski; Martin Brzezinski; Bartosz Stabno	Hungary (HUN); Attila Tas Tóth; Aron Schenk; László Kovács; Gergely Császár

=== Women's events ===
Event	Gold	Silver	Bronze
K1 200 m	Natalia Podolskaya; Russia	Marharyta Tsishkevich; Belarus	Nikolina Moldovan; Serbia
K1 500 m	Maryna Litvinchuk; Belarus	Edyta Dzieniszewska; Poland	Milica Starović; Serbia
K2 200 m	Belarus (BLR); Volha Khudzenka; Maryna Litvinchuk	Serbia (SRB); Nikolina Moldovan; Olivera Moldovan	Russia (RUS); Natalia Proskurina; Anastasia Lavrova
K2 500 m	Belarus (BLR); Aleksandra Grishina; Marharyta Tsishkevich	Russia (RUS); Natalia Lobova; Anastasia Lavrova	Serbia (SRB); Nikolina Moldovan; Olivera Moldovan
K4 200 m	Belarus (BLR); Marharyta Tsishkevich; Nadzeya Papok; Volha Khudzenka; Maryna Litvinchuk	Russia (RUS); Natalia Podolskaya; Vera Sobetova; Anastasia Sergeeva; Natalia Lobova	Spain (ESP); Ainara Portela; Laura Pedruelo; María Corbera; Begoña Lazcano
K4 500 m	Belarus (BLR); Sofiya Yurchanka; Nadzeya Papok; Volha Khudzenka; Maryna Litvinchuk	Russia (RUS); Natalia Proskurina; Inga Gurzhey; Svetlana Chernigovskaya; Elena Anyshina	Poland (POL); Agnieszka Kowalczyk; Ewelina Wojnarowska; Edyta Dzieniszewska; Magdalena Krukowska
