= Canoe sprint at the 2015 European Games – Men's C-2 1000 metres =

Men's C-2 1000 metres at the 2015 European Games
- Venue: Kur Sport and Rowing Centre, Mingachevir
- Date: 14–15 June
- Competitors: 20 from 10 nations
- Winning time: 3:34.412

Medalists
gold medal	Andrei Bahdanovich; Aliaksandr Bahdanovich	Belarus
silver medal	Alexey Korovashkov; Ilya Pervukhin	Russia
bronze medal	Peter Kretschmer; Michael Müller	Germany

The men's C-2 1000 metres canoe sprint competition at the 2015 European Games in Baku took place between 14 and 15 June at the Kur Sport and Rowing Centre in Mingachevir.

== Schedule ==
The schedule was as follows:

Date	Time	Round
Sunday 14 June 2015	10:17	Heats
Sunday 14 June 2015	16:46	Semifinal
Monday 15 June 2015	10:50	Final

All times are Azerbaijan Summer Time (UTC+5)

== Results ==
=== Heats ===
The fastest three boats in each heat advanced directly to the final. The next four fastest boats in each heat, plus the fastest remaining boat advanced to the semifinal.

==== Heat 1 ====
Rank	Canoeists	Country	Time	Notes
1	Mateusz Kamiński; Michał Kudła	Poland	3:38.242	QF, GB
2	Andrei Bahdanovich; Aliaksandr Bahdanovich	Belarus	3:38.398	QF
3	Dmytro Ianchuk; Taras Mishchuk	Ukraine	3:38.452	QF
4	Jaroslav Radoň; Filip Dvořák	Czech Republic	3:38.632	QS
5	Manuel Antonio Campos; Diego Romero	Spain	3:43.370	QS

==== Heat 2 ====
Rank	Canoeists	Country	Time	Notes
1	Henrik Vasbányai; Róbert Mike	Hungary	3:38.393	QF
2	Peter Kretschmer; Michael Müller	Germany	3:38.649	QF
3	Alexey Korovashkov; Ilya Pervukhin	Russia	3:38.668	QF
4	Alexandru Dumitrescu; Victor Mihalachi	Romania	3:39.604	QS
5	Sergiy Bezugliy; Oleksiy Kupin	Azerbaijan	3:46.744	QS

=== Semifinal ===
The fastest three boats advanced to the final.

Rank	Canoeists	Country	Time	Notes
1	Jaroslav Radoň; Filip Dvořák	Czech Republic	3:28.757	QF, GB
2	Sergiy Bezugliy; Oleksiy Kupin	Azerbaijan	3:29.489	QF
3	Alexandru Dumitrescu; Victor Mihalachi	Romania	3:31.724	QF
4	Manuel Antonio Campos; Diego Romero	Spain	3:33.944	

=== Final ===
Competitors in this final raced for positions 1 to 9, with medals going to the top three.

Rank	Canoeists	Country	Time
1st place, gold medalist(s)	Andrei Bahdanovich; Aliaksandr Bahdanovich	Belarus	3:34.412
2nd place, silver medalist(s)	Alexey Korovashkov; Ilya Pervukhin	Russia	3:34.453
3rd place, bronze medalist(s)	Peter Kretschmer; Michael Müller	Germany	3:34.982
4	Henrik Vasbányai; Róbert Mike	Hungary	3:35.231
5	Dmytro Ianchuk; Taras Mishchuk	Ukraine	3:35.561
6	Jaroslav Radoň; Filip Dvořák	Czech Republic	3:36.091
7	Mateusz Kamiński; Michał Kudła	Poland	3:36.815
8	Sergiy Bezugliy; Oleksiy Kupin	Azerbaijan	3:38.088
9	Alexandru Dumitrescu; Victor Mihalachi	Romania	3:41.965
