= 2021 ICF Canoe Sprint World Championships – Men's C-1 5000 metres =

Men's C-1 5000 metres at the 2021 ICF Canoe Sprint World Championships
- Venue: Lake Bagsværd
- Location: Copenhagen, Denmark
- Dates: 19 September
- Competitors: 16 from 16 nations
- Winning time: 23:08.62

Medalists
gold medal	Balázs Adolf	Hungary
silver medal	Sebastian Brendel	Germany
bronze medal	Kirill Shamshurin	International Olympic Committee

The men's C-1 5000 metres competition at the 2021 ICF Canoe Sprint World Championships in Copenhagen took place on Lake Bagsværd.

== Schedule ==
The schedule was as follows:

Date	Time	Round
Sunday 19 September 2021	15:10	Final

All times are Central European Summer Time (UTC+2)

== Results ==
As a long-distance event, it was held as a direct final.

Rank	Canoeist	Country	Time
1st place, gold medalist(s)	Balázs Adolf	Hungary	23:08.62
2nd place, silver medalist(s)	Sebastian Brendel	Germany	23:09.28
3rd place, bronze medalist(s)	Kirill Shamshurin	RCF	23:30.18
4	Filip Dvořák	Czech Republic	23:40.56
5	Serghei Tarnovschi	Moldova	23:55.11
6	Mateusz Kamiński	Poland	24:06.82
7	Adel Mojallali	Iran	24:12.51
8	Fernando Jorge	Cuba	24:28.92
9	Joosep Karlson	Estonia	24:30.67
10	Matej Rusnák	Slovakia	24:38.87
11	Andrii Zakharov	Ukraine	24:40.94
12	Craig Spence	Canada	24:52.98
13	Bruno Kumpez	Croatia	25:45.39
–	Mikita Rudzevich	Belarus	DNF
–	Noel Domínguez	Spain	DSQ
–	Carlo Tacchini	Italy	DSQ
