= Ronilson Oliveira =

Brazilian canoeist (born 1990)

Personal information
- Born: 16 July 1990 (age 36) Santos, São Paulo
Medal record
Men's sprint canoeing
Representing Brazil
Pan American Games
Silver medal – second place	2011 Guadalajara	C-2 1000 m
South American Games
Gold medal – first place	2010 Medellín	C-2 200 m
Gold medal – first place	2010 Medellín	C-2 500 m
Gold medal – first place	2010 Medellín	C-2 1000 m

Ronilson Matias de Oliveira (16 July 1990, Santos, São Paulo) is a Brazilian sprint canoeist. At the 2012 Summer Olympics, he competed in the Men's C-1 200 metres, and the men's C-2 1000 m with Erlon Silva.
