= Sebastian Brendel =

German sprint canoeist

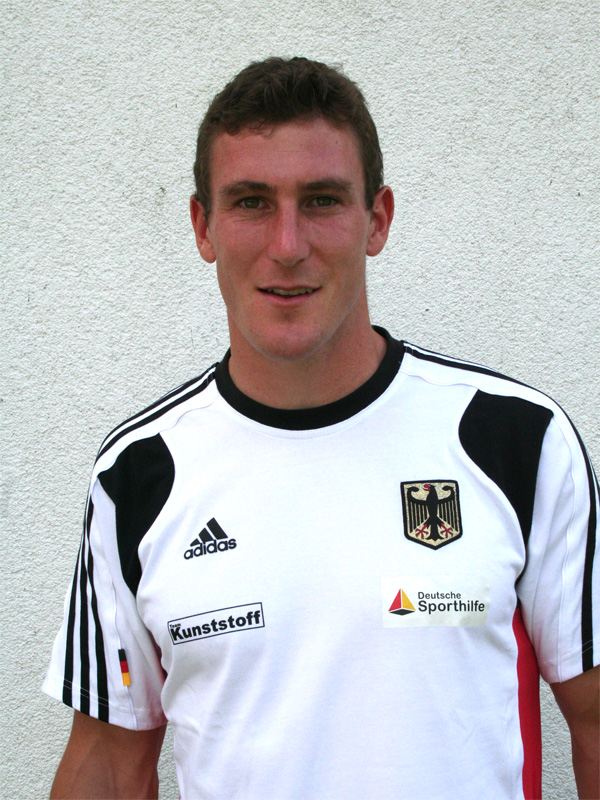
- Brendel in 2011

Personal information
- Nationality: German
- Born: 12 March 1988 (age 38) Schwedt, East Germany
- Height: 192 cm (6 ft 4 in)
- Weight: 92 kg (203 lb)

Sport
- Country: Germany
- Sport: Canoe sprint
- Club: KC Potsdam
Medal record
Men's canoe sprint
Representing Germany
Event	1st	2nd	3rd
Olympic Games	3	0	1
World Championships	13	8	5
European Championships	14	5	1
European Games	1	0	1
Total	31	13	8
Olympic Games
Gold medal – first place	2012 London	C-1 1000 m
Gold medal – first place	2016 Rio de Janeiro	C-1 1000 m
Gold medal – first place	2016 Rio de Janeiro	C-2 1000 m
Bronze medal – third place	2020 Tokyo	C-2 1000 m
World Championships
Gold medal – first place	2013 Duisburg	C-1 5000 m
Gold medal – first place	2014 Moscow	C-1 1000 m
Gold medal – first place	2014 Moscow	C-1 5000 m
Gold medal – first place	2015 Milan	C–1 1000 m
Gold medal – first place	2015 Milan	C–1 5000 m
Gold medal – first place	2017 Račice	C-1 1000 m
Gold medal – first place	2017 Račice	C-1 5000 m
Gold medal – first place	2017 Račice	C-4 1000 m
Gold medal – first place	2018 Montemor-o-Velho	C-1 1000 m
Gold medal – first place	2018 Montemor-o-Velho	C-1 5000 m
Gold medal – first place	2019 Szeged	C-1 500 m
Gold medal – first place	2019 Szeged	C-1 5000 m
Gold medal – first place	2022 Dartmouth	C-2 1000 m
Silver medal – second place	2007 Duisburg	C-4 500 m
Silver medal – second place	2013 Duisburg	C-1 1000 m
Silver medal – second place	2013 Duisburg	C–1 4x200 m
Silver medal – second place	2014 Moscow	C-1 500 m
Silver medal – second place	2018 Montemor-o-Velho	C-1 500 m
Silver medal – second place	2021 Copenhagen	C-1 5000 m
Silver medal – second place	2022 Dartmouth	C-2 Mix 500 m
Silver medal – second place	2023 Duisburg	C-1 5000 m
Bronze medal – third place	2009 Dartmouth	C-1 1000 m
Bronze medal – third place	2010 Poznań	C-1 1000 m
Bronze medal – third place	2011 Szeged	C-1 4x200 m
Bronze medal – third place	2022 Dartmouth	C-1 5000 m
Bronze medal – third place	2023 Duisburg	C-1 1000 m
European Championships
Gold medal – first place	2011 Belgrade	C-1 1000 m
Gold medal – first place	2012 Zagreb	C-1 1000 m
Gold medal – first place	2013 Montemor-o-Velho	C-1 5000 m
Gold medal – first place	2014 Brandenburg	C-1 1000 m
Gold medal – first place	2014 Brandenburg	C-1 5000 m
Gold medal – first place	2015 Račice	C-1 1000 m
Gold medal – first place	2015 Račice	C-1 5000 m
Gold medal – first place	2016 Moscow	C-1 1000 m
Gold medal – first place	2017 Plovdiv	C-1 1000 m
Gold medal – first place	2017 Plovdiv	C-1 5000 m
Gold medal – first place	2018 Belgrade	C-1 5000 m
Gold medal – first place	2021 Poznań	C-1 5000 m
Gold medal – first place	2021 Poznań	C-2 1000 m
Gold medal – first place	2022 Munich	C-1 5000 m
Gold medal – first place	2022 Munich	C-2 1000 m
Silver medal – second place	2014 Brandenburg	C-1 500 m
Silver medal – second place	2017 Plovdiv	C-4 1000 m
Silver medal – second place	2018 Belgrade	C-1 500 m
Silver medal – second place	2018 Belgrade	C-1 1000 m
Silver medal – second place	2021 Poznań	C-2 500 m
Bronze medal – third place	2022 Munich	C-2 500 m
European Games
Gold medal – first place	2015 Baku	C-1 1000 m
Bronze medal – third place	2019 Minsk	C-1 1000 m

Sebastian Brendel (pronounced [zeˈbasti̯a(ː)n ˈbʁɛndl̩]; born 12 March 1988) is a German sprint canoeist who has competed since 2007. Brendel is the 2016 Olympic champion in the C-1 1000 metres and C-2 1000 metres events.

== Career ==
He has won three medals at the ICF Canoe Sprint World Championships with a silver (C-4 500 m: 2007) and two bronzes (C-1 1000 m: 2009, 2010). He is the current world record holder in the C-1 1000m as of the 2014 ICF World Championships in Moscow, Russia.

Brendel won a gold medal at the 2012 London Olympics in canoeing's C-1 1,000 metres event for his country. At the 2016 Rio de Janeiro Olympics, he defended this title successfully and added another one, at the C-2 1000 metres, together with Jan Vandrey. Germany won the gold medal in this category also in London, but with Peter Kretschmer and Kurt Kuschela.

He also competed in the Tokyo 2020 Olympic Games and won Bronze in the Men's C-2 1000 metres event.
