= 2019 ICF Canoe Sprint World Championships – Men's C-1 5000 metres =

Men's C-1 5000 metres at the 2019 ICF Canoe Sprint World Championships
- Venue: Olympic Centre of Szeged
- Location: Szeged, Hungary
- Dates: 25 August
- Competitors: 22 from 22 nations
- Winning time: 22:15.86

Medalists
gold medal	Sebastian Brendel	Germany
silver medal	Balázs Adolf	Hungary
bronze medal	Fernando Jorge	Cuba

The men's C-1 5000 metres competition at the 2019 ICF Canoe Sprint World Championships in Szeged took place at the Olympic Centre of Szeged.

== Schedule ==
The schedule was as follows:

Date	Time	Round
Sunday 25 August 2019	15:10	Final

All times are Central European Summer Time (UTC+2)

== Results ==
As a long-distance event, it was held as a direct final.

Rank	Canoeist	Country	Time
1st place, gold medalist(s)	Sebastian Brendel	Germany	22:15.86
2nd place, silver medalist(s)	Balázs Adolf	Hungary	22:19.15
3rd place, bronze medalist(s)	Fernando Jorge	Cuba	22:30.46
4	Carlo Tacchini	Italy	22:34.62
5	Rigoberto Camilo	Mexico	23:00.21
6	Kirill Shamshurin	Russia	23:03.79
7	Jakub Březina	Czech Republic	23:09.73
8	Mohammad Nabi Rezaei	Iran	23:27.81
9	Manuel Campos	Spain	23:39.67
10	Wiktor Głazunow	Poland	23:41.53
11	Aivis Tints	Latvia	23:49.27
12	Joosep Karlson	Estonia	23:56.82
13	Yurii Vandiuk	Ukraine	24:17.94
14	Liu Hao	China	24:28.25
15	Bruno Kumpez	Croatia	24:35.58
16	Shahriyor Daminov	Tajikistan	25:00.50
17	Ivan Patapenka	Belarus	25:27.99
18	Ara Virabyan	Armenia	25:35.95
19	Masato Hashimoto	Japan	25:58.75
20	Velibor Marinkovic	Bosnia and Herzegovina	26:03.91
–	Connor Fitzpatrick	Canada	DNF
–	Shourabh	India	DSQ
