= Canoe sprint at the 2015 European Games – Men's C-1 1000 metres =

Men's C-1 1000 metres at the 2015 European Games
- Venue: Kur Sport and Rowing Centre, Mingachevir
- Date: 14–15 June
- Competitors: 14 from 14 nations
- Winning time: 3:50.147

Medalists
gold medal	Sebastian Brendel	Germany
silver medal	Martin Fuksa	Czech Republic
bronze medal	Attila Vajda	Hungary

The men's C-1 1000 metres canoe sprint competition at the 2015 European Games in Baku took place between 14 and 15 June at the Kur Sport and Rowing Centre in Mingachevir.

== Schedule ==
The schedule was as follows:

Date	Time	Round
Sunday 14 June 2015	09:00	Heats
Sunday 14 June 2015	15:54	Semifinal
Monday 15 June 2015	10:21	Final

All times are Azerbaijan Summer Time (UTC+5)

== Results ==
=== Heats ===
The fastest three boats in each heat advanced directly to the final. The next four fastest boats in each heat, plus the fastest remaining boat advanced to the semifinal.

==== Heat 1 ====
Rank	Canoeist	Country	Time	Notes
1	Sebastian Brendel	Germany	3:54.890	QF, GB
2	Attila Vajda	Hungary	3:56.208	QF
3	Sergiu Craciun	Italy	3:59.178	QF
4	Taras Matviichuk	Azerbaijan	4:04.220	QS
5	Leonid Carp	Romania	4:05.710	QS
6	André Oliveira	Spain	4:12.760	QS
7	Kerim Tenha	Turkey	4:38.160	QS

==== Heat 2 ====
Rank	Canoeist	Country	Time	Notes
1	Martin Fuksa	Czech Republic	3:57.523	QF
2	Tomasz Kaczor	Poland	4:00.357	QF
3	Oleg Tarnovschi	Moldova	4:01.200	QF
4	Matej Rusnák	Slovakia	4:04.777	QS
5	James Styan	Great Britain	4:11.007	QS
6	Maksim Piatrou	Belarus	4:13.420	QS
7	Mathieu Goubel	France	4:21.880	QS

=== Semifinal ===
The fastest three boats advanced to the final.

Rank	Canoeist	Country	Time	Notes
1	Maksim Piatrou	Belarus	3:46.108	QF, GB
2	Leonid Carp	Romania	3:46.493	QF
3	Mathieu Goubel	France	3:47.049	QF
4	Matej Rusnák	Slovakia	3:47.954	
5	Taras Matviichuk	Azerbaijan	3:48.150	
5	André Oliveira	Spain	3:48.150	
7	James Styan	Great Britain	3:52.822	
–	Kerim Tenha	Turkey	DSQ	

=== Final ===
Competitors in this final raced for positions 1 to 9, with medals going to the top three.

Rank	Canoeist	Country	Time
1st place, gold medalist(s)	Sebastian Brendel	Germany	3:50.147
2nd place, silver medalist(s)	Martin Fuksa	Czech Republic	3:51.110
3rd place, bronze medalist(s)	Attila Vajda	Hungary	3:51.920
4	Tomasz Kaczor	Poland	3:54.908
5	Maksim Piatrou	Belarus	3:55.513
6	Sergiu Craciun	Italy	3:56.306
7	Oleg Tarnovschi	Moldova	3:58.152
8	Leonid Carp	Romania	3:58.836
9	Mathieu Goubel	France	4:03.486
