= 2024 ICF Canoe Sprint World Championships – Men's C-1 5000 metres =

Men's C-1 5000 metres at the 2024 ICF Canoe Sprint World Championships
- Venue: Rowing and Canoeing Race Course in Samarkand
- Location: Samarkand, Uzbekistan
- Dates: 25 August
- Competitors: 18 from 17 nations
- Winning time: 25:33.565

Medalists
gold medal	Wiktor Głazunow	Poland
silver medal	Serghei Tarnovschi	Moldova
bronze medal	Balázs Adolf	Hungary

The men's C-1 5000 metres competition at the 2024 ICF Canoe Sprint World Championships in Samarkand took place in Rowing and Canoeing Race Course in Samarkand.

== Schedule ==
The schedule is as follows:

Date	Time	Round
Sunday 25 August 2024	16:39	Final

== Results ==
As a long-distance event, it was held as a direct final.

Rank	Canoeist	Country	Time
1st place, gold medalist(s)	Wiktor Głazunow	Poland	25:33.565
2nd place, silver medalist(s)	Serghei Tarnovschi	Moldova	25:49.241
3rd place, bronze medalist(s)	Balázs Adolf	Hungary	26:30.410
4	Nurislom Tukhtasin Ugli	Uzbekistan	27:05.177
5	Manuel Garrido	Spain	27:19.685
6	Ivan Dmitriev	Authorised Neutral Athletes	27:23.596
7	Dmytro Yanchuk	Ukraine	28:05.722
8	Polat Turebekov	Kazakhstan	28:22.678
9	Qu Xiangjie	China	28:25.210
10	Shuhei Hosumi	Japan	28:55.566
11	Muhammad Rajabov	Tajikistan	28:55.566
12	Kim Yi-yeol	South Korea	29:23.695
	Daniel Pacheco	Colombia	DNS
	Huang Wei-jung	Chinese Taipei	DNF
	Janus Ercilla	Philippines	DNF
	Conrad-Robin Scheibner	Germany	DNS
	Ara Virabyan	Armenia	DNF
	Ivan Patapenka	Authorised Neutral Athletes	DNF
