= 2012 Canoe Sprint European Championships =

International canoeing and kayaking event

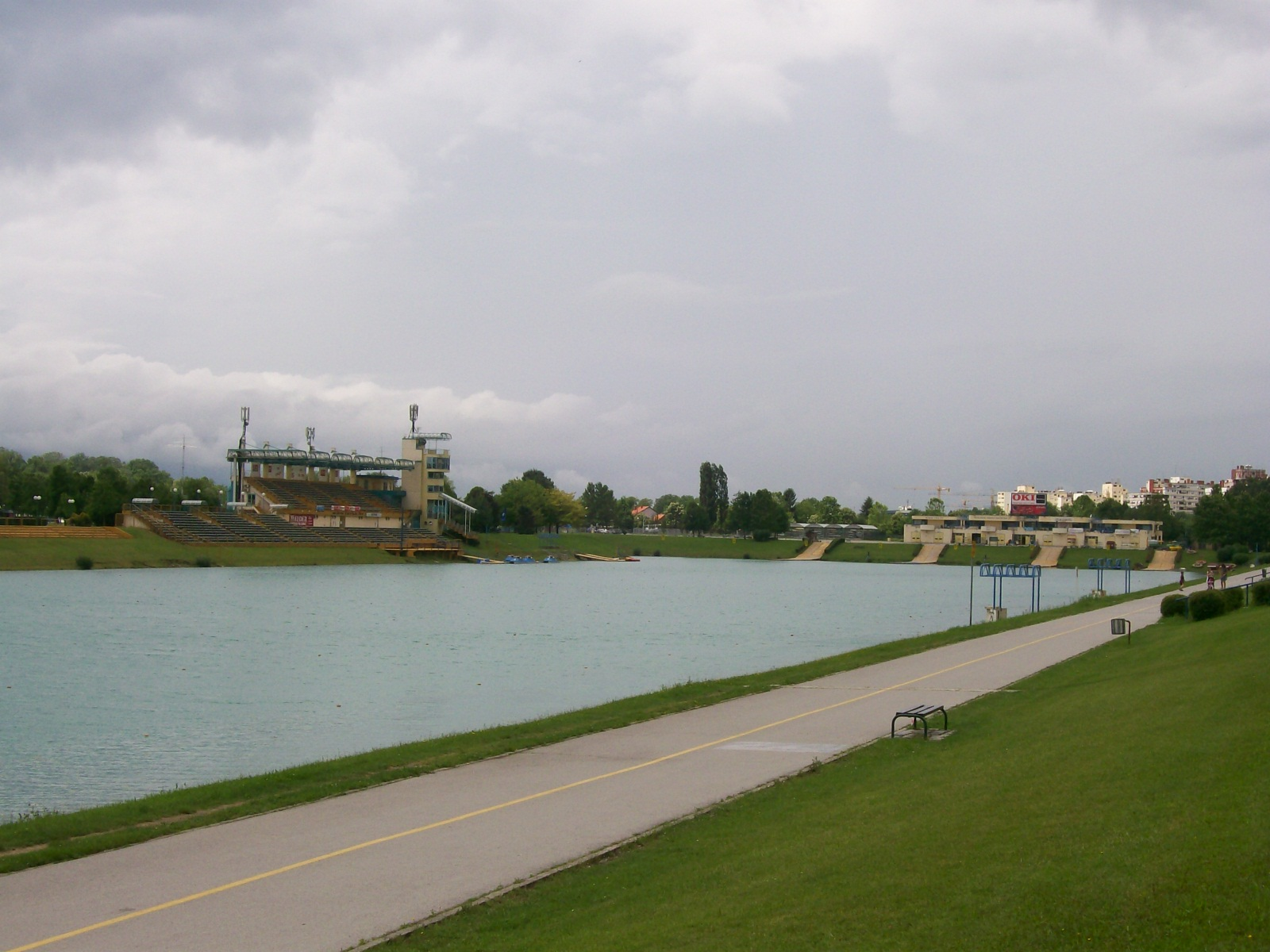
- Venue: Lake Jarun
- Location: Zagreb, Croatia
- Start date: 22 June
- End date: 24 June

The 2012 Canoe Sprint European Championships was held on 22–24 June at Zagreb, Croatia.

== Medal table ==
Rank	Nation	Gold	Silver	Bronze	Total
1	Germany (GER)	5	5	1	11
2	Hungary (HUN)	5	2	3	10
3	Belarus (BLR)	2	5	3	10
4	France (FRA)	2	3	0	5
4	Romania (ROU)	2	3	0	5
6	Poland (POL)	2	2	2	6
7	Czech Republic (CZE)	1	2	0	3
8	Serbia (SRB)	1	1	1	3
9	Denmark (DEN)	1	1	0	2
10	Great Britain (GBR)	1	0	1	2
10	Lithuania (LTU)	1	0	1	2
12	Azerbaijan (AZE)	1	0	0	1
12	Bulgaria (BUL)	1	0	0	1
12	Sweden (SWE)	1	0	0	1
15	Spain (ESP)	0	3	3	6
16	Ukraine (UKR)	0	0	3	3
17	Portugal (POR)	0	0	2	2
17	Slovakia (SVK)	0	0	2	2
19	Austria (AUT)	0	0	1	1
19	Italy (ITA)	0	0	1	1
19	Slovenia (SVN)	0	0	1	1
Totals (21 entries)		26	27	25	78

== Medal overview ==
=== Men ===
Event	Gold	Time	Silver	Time	Bronze	Time
C-1 200 m	Valentin Demyanenko (AZE)	38.752	Alfonso Benavides (ESP)	38.968	Jevgenij Shuklin (LTU)	39.060
C-1 500 m	Mathieu Goubel (FRA)	1:47.495	Martin Fuksa (CZE)	1:48.211	David Cal (ESP)	1:48.567
C-1 1000 m	Sebastian Brendel (GER)	3:50.726	Mathieu Goubel (FRA)	3:51.462	Aliaksandr Zhukouski (BLR)	3:54.102
C-1 5000 m	Florin Comănici (ROU)	22:55.509	Manuel Antonio Campos (ESP)	23:21.833	Matej Rusnák (SVK)	23:31.905
C-2 200 m	Lithuania; Raimundas Labuckas; Tomas Gadeikis	35.956	Belarus; Dzmitry Rabchanka; Aliaksandr Vauchetski	36.820	Italy; Daniele Santini; Luca Incollingo	37.472
C-2 500 m	Czech Republic; Jaroslav Radoň; Filip Dvořák	1:39.564	Romania; Alexandru Dumitrescu; Victor Mihalachi	1:40.028	Ukraine; Vitaliy Vergeles; Denys Kamerylov	1:40.792
C-2 1000 m	Romania; Alexandru Dumitrescu; Victor Mihalachi	3:35.020	Germany; Peter Kretschmer; Kurt Kuschela	3:35.544	Belarus; Andrei Bahdanovich; Aliaksandr Bahdanovich	3:35.744
C-4 1000 m	Belarus; Dzmitry Rabchanka; Dzmitry Vaitsishkin; Dzianis Harazha; Aliaksandr Vauchetski	3:22.139	Romania; Josif Chirilă; Cătălin Costache; Mihail Simion; Florin Comănici	3:23.551	Hungary; Márton Tóth; Róbert Mike; Henrik Vasbányai; Szabolcs Németh	3:25.799
K-1 200 m	Marko Novaković (SRB)	34.431	Maxime Beaumont (FRA)	34.479	Edward McKeever (GBR)	34.499
K-1 500 m	Anders Gustafsson (SWE)	1:36.858	Marek Twardowski (POL); Josef Dostál (CZE)	1:36.998	not awarded	
K-1 1000 m	Max Hoff (GER)	3:27.214	René Holten Poulsen (DEN)	3:29.326	Francisco Cubelos (ESP)	3:29.422
K-1 5000 m	Aleh Yurenia (BLR)	20:33.221	Max Hoff (GER)	20:34.245	Milán Noé (HUN)	21:10.717
K-2 200 m	United Kingdom; Liam Heath; Jon Schofield	31.596	Germany; Ronald Rauhe; Jonas Ems	31.780	Poland; Sebastian Szypula; Dawid Putto	31.904
K-2 500 m	France; Arnaud Hybois; Sébastien Jouve	1:27.094	Serbia; Duško Stanojević; Dejan Pajić	1:27.382	Belarus; Raman Piatrushenka; Vadzim Makhneu	1:27.390
K-2 1000 m	Hungary; Rudolf Dombi; Roland Kökény	3:13.981	Germany; Martin Hollstein; Andreas Ihle	3:15.011	Slovakia; Peter Gelle; Erik Vlček	3:15.551
K-4 1000 m	Denmark; Kim Wraae; René Holten Poulsen; Emil Stćr; Kasper Bleibach	2:51.947	Romania; Traian Neagu; Toni Ioneticu; Ştefan Vasile; Petrus Gavrila	2:52.239	Serbia; Milenko Zorić; Ervin Holpert; Aleksandar Aleksić; Dejan Terzić	2:52.959

=== Women ===
Event	Gold	Time	Silver	Time	Bronze	Time
C-1 200 m	Staniliya Stamenova (BUL)	48.915	Sophie Cordelier (FRA)	50.088	Olga Aliohina (UKR)	50.104
C-2 500 m	Hungary; Kincső Takács; Zsanett Lakatos	2:07.878	Belarus; Katsiaryna Herasimenka; Sviatlana Tulupava	2:09.510	Ukraine; Nataliya Zhiliuk; Dariya Motova	2:16.062
K-1 200 m	Nataša Dušev-Janić (HUN)	39.372	Marta Walczykiewicz (POL)	39.652	Teresa Portela (POR)	40.376
K-1 500 m	Katrin Wagner-Augustin (GER)	1:49.300	Danuta Kozák (HUN)	1:49.948	Špela Ponomarenko Janić (SVN)	1:51.252
K-1 1000 m	Malgorzata Wardowicz (POL)	4:01.023	Silke Hörmann (GER)	4:02.251	Ana Roxana Lehaci (AUT)	4:02.867
K-1 5000 m	Renáta Csay (HUN)	22:46.576	Eva Barrios (ESP)	23:00.888	Katrin Wagner-Augustin (GER)	23:01.440
K-2 200 m	Germany; Franziska Weber; Tina Dietze	0:35.878	Belarus; Volha Khudzenka; Maryna Pautaran	0:35.994	Portugal; Joana Vasconcelos; Beatriz Gomes	0:36.154
K-2 500 m	Hungary; Katalin Kovács; Nataša Dušev-Janić	1:38.704	Belarus; Volha Khudzenka; Maryna Pautaran	1:39.144	Poland; Karolina Naja; Beata Mikolajczyk	1:39.292
K-2 1000 m	Poland; Karolina Naja; Beata Mikolajczyk	3:39.096	Hungary; Anna Karasz; Ninetta Vad	3:40.470	Spain; Beatriz Manchón; Jana Smidakova	3:41.760
K-4 500 m	Germany; Carolin Leonhardt; Franziska Weber; Katrin Wagner-Augustin; Tina Dietze	1:32.176	Belarus; Iryna Pamialova; Nadzeya Papok; Volha Khudzenka; Maryna Pautaran	1:33.356	Hungary; Gabriella Szabó; Danuta Kozák; Katalin Kovács; Krisztina Fazekas Zur	1:34.832
