= MasterChef + (Brazilian TV series) season 2 =

MasterChef +
- Season 2
- Presented by: Ana Paula Padrão
- Judges: Érick Jacquin; Helena Rizzo; Henrique Fogaça
- No. of contestants: 12
- Winners: Eduardo; Maria do Carmo
- Runners-up: Cida; Mônica
- No. of episodes: 6

Release
- Original network: Band
- Original release: November 21 – December 26, 2023

Season chronology
- ← Previous; Season 1

The second season of the Brazilian competitive reality television series MasterChef + premiered on November 21, 2023, at 10:45 p.m. on Band.

The grand prize was R$25.000 courtesy by Pão de Açúcar plus 25.000 Stix points in exchange for prizes, a special cookware set by Royal Prestige, a complete home bar and a beer sommelier course all courtesy by Eisenbahn, a kitchen equipped with utensils and appliances by Arcelormittal and the MasterChef + trophy.

Tattoo artist Eduardo de Mingo and massage therapist Maria do Carmo Prado won the competition over PhD in public health Cida Cabral and braider Mônica Divina on December 26, 2023.

== Contestants ==
=== Top 20 ===
	Erick Jacquin	Helena Rizzo	Henrique Fogaça
Irma			
Eduardo			
Clélio			
Sylvia			
Ubirajara			
Elisiário			
Ricardo L.			
Cida			
Terezinha			
Maria Sueli			
Marco			
Ida			
Rachel			
Cláudio			
Suyan			
José Carlos			
Dimas			
Maria do Carmo			
Ricardo A.			
Mônica			

=== Top 12 ===
Contestant	Age	Hometown	Occupation	Result	Winnings
Eduardo de Mingo	63	São Paulo	Tattoo artist	Winners on December 26	1
Maria do Carmo Prado	79	Paraguaçu	Massage therapist	Winners on December 26	1
Aparecida "Cida" Cabral	68	Ubatã	PhD in public health	Runners-up on December 26	3
Mônica Divina	70	Ribeirão Preto	Braider	Runners-up on December 26	3
Cláudio Gonçalves	65	São Paulo	Finance analyst	Eliminated on December 19	1
Suyan Rambor	64	Porto Alegre	Executive & engineer	Eliminated on December 19	1
Ida Saliba	87	Aquidauana	Retired lawyer	Eliminated on December 12	1
Rachel Leite	78	Belo Horizonte	Retired architect	Eliminated on December 12	1
Elisiário dos Santos	73	São Paulo	Retired art teacher	Eliminated on December 5	0
Ricardo Araujo	65	Campos dos Goytacazes	Physical educator	Eliminated on December 5	0
Irma Gielow	80	Dona Emma	Retired seamstress	Eliminated on November 28	0
Marco Marcela	62	Pirassununga	Electrical maintenance technician	Eliminated on November 28	0

== Elimination table ==
Place	Contestant	Episode							
Place	Contestant	2		3	4		5		6
1	Eduardo	IN	HIGH	WIN	IN	LOW	IN	HIGH	WINNERS
1	Maria do Carmo	HIGH	IMM	WIN	IN	LOW	HIGH	IMM	WINNERS
2	Cida	IN	HIGH	WIN	WIN	IMM	WIN	IMM	RUNNERS-UP
2	Mônica	HIGH	IMM	WIN	WIN	IMM	IN	WIN	RUNNERS-UP
5–6	Cláudio	IN	LOW	WIN	IN	HIGH	IN	ELIM	
5–6	Suyan	IN	HIGH	WIN	IN	WIN	IN	ELIM	
7–8	Ida	IN	WIN	PT	IN	ELIM			
7–8	Rachel	WIN	IMM	PT	IN	ELIM			
9–10	Elisiário	IN	HIGH	ELIM					
9–10	Ricardo	HIGH	IMM	ELIM					
11–12	Irma	IN	ELIM						
11–12	Marco	IN	ELIM						

=== Key ===
- Winner
- Runner-up
- Individual challenge winner
- Individual challenge top entry
- Mystery Box bottom entry
- Team challenge winner
- Team challenge loser (PT)
- Immunity
- Immunity extra
- Saved first
- Saved last
- Eliminated

== Ratings and reception ==
=== Brazilian ratings ===
All numbers are in points and provided by Kantar Ibope Media.

Episode	Title	Air date	Timeslot (BRT)	SP viewers (in points)	BR viewers (in points)	Ref.
1	Top 20 – Auditions	November 21, 2023	Tuesday 10:45 p.m.	1.1	Outside top 10	
2	Top 12	November 28, 2023	Tuesday 10:45 p.m.	1.0	Outside top 10	
3	Top 10	December 5, 2023	Tuesday 10:45 p.m.	1.5	Outside top 10	
4	Top 8	December 12, 2023	Tuesday 10:45 p.m.	1.4	Outside top 10	
5	Top 6	December 19, 2023	Tuesday 10:45 p.m.	1.5	1.2	
6	Winner announced	December 26, 2023	Tuesday 10:45 p.m.	2.0	1.2	

- In 2023, each point represents 268.083 households in 15 market cities in Brazil (76.953 households in São Paulo).
