= Ilya Pervukhin =

Russian canoeist (born 1991)

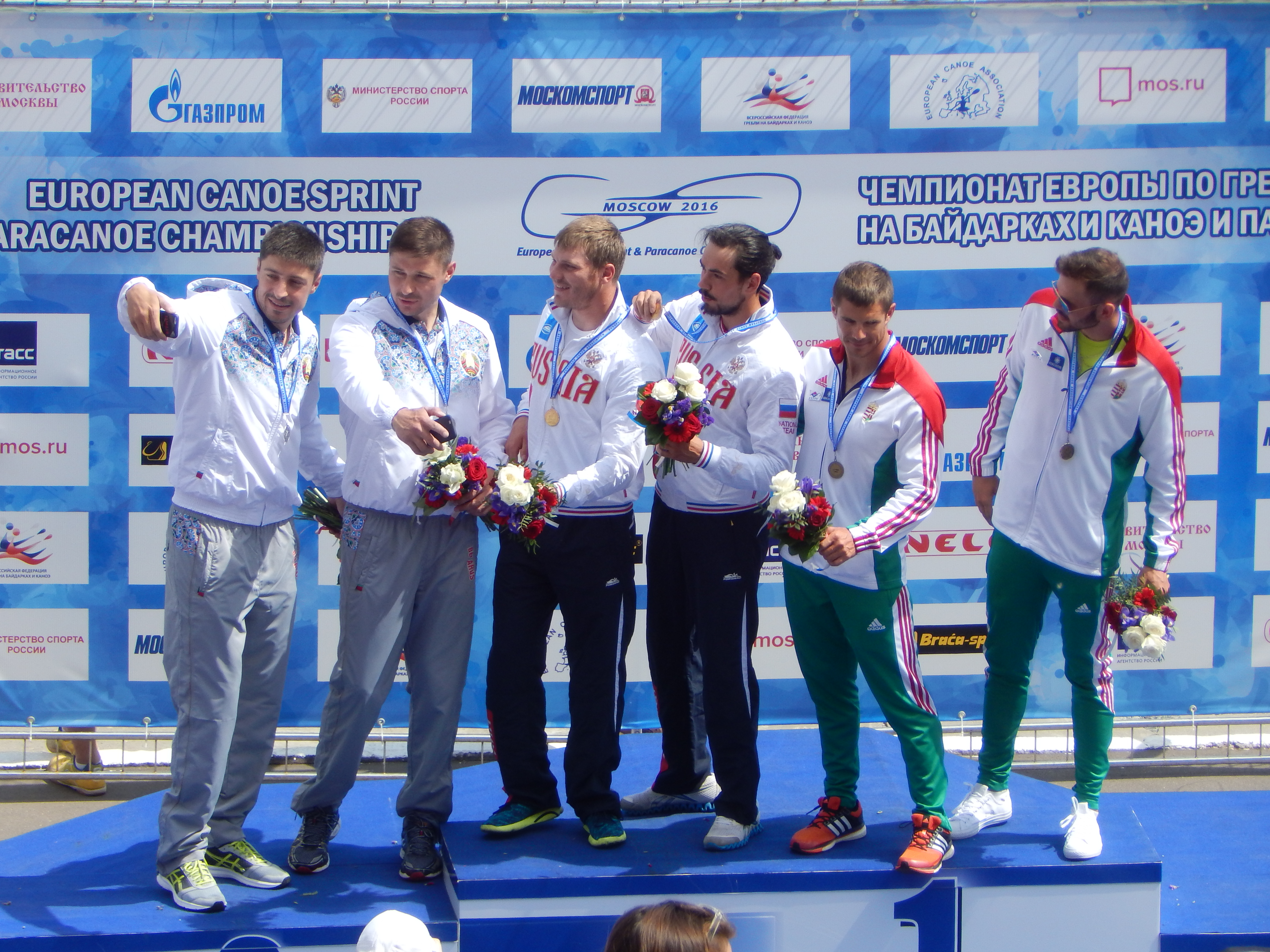

Personal information
- Full name: Ilya Alekseyevich Pervukhin
- Born: 6 July 1991 (age 35) Tver, Russia
- Height: 1.83 m (6 ft 0 in)
- Weight: 82 kg (181 lb)

Sport
- Country: Russia
- Sport: Canoe
Medal record
Men's canoe sprint
Representing Russia
Olympic Games
Bronze medal – third place	2012 London	C-2 1000 m
World Championships
Gold medal – first place	2014 Moscow	C-4 1000 m
Silver medal – second place	2013 Duisburg	C-2 1000 m
Bronze medal – third place	2018 Montemor-o-Velho	C-2 1000 m
European Championships
Gold medal – first place	2011 Belgrade	C-2 1000 m
Gold medal – first place	2013 Montemor-o-Velho	C-2 1000 m
Gold medal – first place	2016 Moscow	C-2 1000 m
Silver medal – second place	2010 Tresona	C-2 1000 m
Silver medal – second place	2014 Brandenburg	C-2 1000 m
Silver medal – second place	2015 Račice	C-2 1000 m
Silver medal – second place	2021 Poznań	C-2 1000 m
Bronze medal – third place	2017 Plovdiv	C-4 1000 m
Universiade
Gold medal – first place	2013 Kazan	C-2 1000 m
European Games
Silver medal – second place	2015 Baku	C-2 1000 m
Bronze medal – third place	2019 Minsk	C-2 1000 m

Ilya Alekseyevich Pervukhin (Russian: Илья Алексеевич Первухин; born 6 July 1991) is a Russian canoeist who has won medals at Olympic, World and European level.

== Career ==
Pervukhin made his international debut at the 2010 European Championship.

He won the bronze medal at the 2012 Summer Olympics in the C-2 1000 m event, alongside Alexey Korovashkov.

At the 2013 World Championships, Pervukhin and Viktor Melantyev won the silver medal in the C2 1000 m.

In 2014, Pervukhin competed in both the senior and U23 World and European Championships. He won gold at the U23 European Championships and the U23 World Championships in the C2 1000 m, and gold in the C4 1000 m at the senior World Championships.

In June 2015, he competed in the inaugural European Games, for Russia in canoe sprint, more specifically, Men's C-2 1000m with Alexey Korovashkov. He earned a silver medal. The team also won silver in the same event at the 2015 European Championships. Also in that year, he was awarded the title of Honoured Master of Sport in Russia.

At the 2016 European Championships, Pervukhin and Korovashkov won the gold medal in the C2 1000 m. He competed in the men's C2 1000 metres at the 2016 Summer Olympics, alongside Ilya Shtokalov, finishing in 5th place.

In the C4 1000 m, he was part of the Russian team which won bronze at the 2017 European Championships.

In 2018, he won bronze in the C2 1000 m at the World Championships, with Kirill Shamshurin.
