= 2024 ICF Canoe Sprint World Championships – Men's C-2 1000 metres =

Men's C-2 1000 metres at the 2024 ICF Canoe Sprint World Championships
- Venue: Rowing and Canoeing Race Course in Samarkand
- Location: Samarkand, Uzbekistan
- Dates: 23–24 August
- Competitors: 36 from 18 nations
- Winning time: 43.053

Medalists
gold medal	Zakhar Petrov; Ivan Dmitriev	Individual Neutral Athletes
silver medal	Balázs Adolf; Dániel Fejes	Hungary
bronze medal	Yurii Vandiuk; Pavlo Borsuk	Ukraine

The men's C-2 1000 metres competition at the 2024 ICF Canoe Sprint World Championships in Samarkand took place in Rowing and Canoeing Race Course in Samarkand.

== Schedule ==
The schedule is as follows:

Date	Time	Round
Friday 24 August 2024	09:42	Heats
Friday 24 August 2024	11:21	Semifinal
Saturday 24 August 2024	14:26	Final A

== Results ==
=== Heats ===
The fastest three boats in each heat advanced directly to the final.
The next four fastest boats in each heat, plus the fastest remaining boat advanced to the semifinal

==== Heat 1 ====
Rank	Canoeist	Country	Time	Notes
1	Zakhar Petrov; Ivan Dmitriev	Individual Neutral Athletes	3:43.703	QF
2	Noel Domínguez; Adrián Sieiro	Spain	3:44.921	QF
3	Mirjalol Kamilov; Kamronbek Akhtamov	Uzbekistan	3:45.655	QF
4	Mei Chao; Wang Ronglu	China	3:46.665	QS
5	Alejandro Rodríguez; Daniel Pacheco	Colombia	3:50.958	QS
6	Timur Alikhanov; Polat Turebekov	Kazakhstan	4:05.415	QS
7	Kim Yi-yeol; Hwang Seon-hong	South Korea	4:15.833	QS
8	Ara Virabyan; Vahe Davtyan	Armenia	4:35.831	QS
	Wiktor Głazunow; Oleksii Koliadych	Armenia	DSQ	

==== Heat 2 ====
Rank	Canoeist	Country	Time	Notes
1	Balázs Adolf; Dániel Fejes	Hungary	3:43.002	QF
2	Ilie Sprîncean; Oleg Nuță	Romania	3:44.713	QF
3	Oleg Tarnovschi; Serghei Tarnovschi	Moldova	3:49.731	QF
4	Adam Rudolf; Antonin Hrabal	Czech Republic	3:51.112	QS
5	Ilya Verashchaka; Vitali Asetski	Individual Neutral Athletes	3:56.724	QS
6	Yurii Vandiuk; Pavlo Borsuk	Ukraine	3:58.301	QS
7	Amirjon Bobojonov; Bobojon Bobojonov	Tajikistan	3:58.633	QS
	Arjun Singh; Gyaneshwor Singh Philem	India	DSQ	

=== Semifinal ===
The fastest three boats advanced to the A final.

Rank	Canoeist	Country	Time	Notes
1	Yurii Vandiuk; Pavlo Borsuk	Ukraine	3:47.143	QF
2	Adam Rudolf; Antonin Hrabal	Czech Republic	3:50.154	QF
3	Mei Chao; Wang Ronglu	China	3:50.267	QF
4	Alejandro Rodríguez; Daniel Pacheco	Colombia	3:51.489	
5	Timur Alikhanov; Polat Turebekov	Kazakhstan	4:00.786	
6	Amirjon Bobojonov; Bobojon Bobojonov	Tajikistan	4:01.547	
7	Ara Virabyan; Vahe Davtyan	Armenia	4:15.544	
8	Kim Yi-yeol; Hwang Seon-hong	South Korea	4:41.853	
	Ilya Verashchaka; Vitali Asetski	Individual Neutral Athletes	DSQ	

=== Final ===
Competitors raced for positions 1 to 9, with medals going to the top three.

Rank	Canoeist	Country	Time
1st place, gold medalist(s)	Zakhar Petrov; Ivan Dmitriev	Individual Neutral Athletes	3:41.510
2nd place, silver medalist(s)	Balázs Adolf; Dániel Fejes	Hungary	3:42.120
3rd place, bronze medalist(s)	Yurii Vandiuk; Pavlo Borsuk	Ukraine	3:42.433
4	Oleg Tarnovschi; Serghei Tarnovschi	Moldova	3:45.302
5	Ilie Sprîncean; Oleg Nuță	Romania	3:47.230
6	Mei Chao; Wang Ronglu	China	3:54.373
7	Adam Rudolf; Antonin Hrabal	Czech Republic	3:57.181
8	Noel Domínguez; Adrián Sieiro	Spain	4:01.201
9	Mirjalol Kamilov; Kamronbek Akhtamov	Uzbekistan	4:58.003
