= Bahdanovich =

Bahdanovich is a surname. Notable people with the surname include:

- Aliaksandr Bahdanovich (born 1982), Belarusian sprint canoer
- Andrei Bahdanovich (born 1987), Belarusian sprint canoer
- Maksim Bahdanovich (1891–1917), Belarusian poet, journalist, and translator
