= MasterChef + (Brazilian TV series) season 1 =

MasterChef +
- Season 1
- Presented by: Ana Paula Padrão
- Judges: Érick Jacquin; Helena Rizzo; Henrique Fogaça
- No. of contestants: 8
- Winners: Astro; Pietro
- Runners-up: Nadja; Sérgio
- No. of episodes: 5

Release
- Original network: Band
- Original release: November 15 – December 13, 2022

Season chronology
- Next → Season 2

The first season of the Brazilian competitive reality television series MasterChef + premiered on November 15, 2022, at 10:45 p.m. on Band.

The grand prize was R$15.000 cash prize and the MasterChef + trophy.

Househusband Astro Ribeiro and retired Pietro Coccaro won the competition over chemist Nadja Celina and executive Sérgio Ferreira on December 13, 2022.

== Contestants ==
=== Top 20 ===
	Erick Jacquin	Helena Rizzo	Benny Novak	Mara Salles	Renata Braune
Flávio†					
Marivoni					
Helena					
Astro					
Gilda					
Maria H.					
Nadja					
Glaci					
Degivaldo					
Laura					
Sérgio					
Malu					
Pietro					
Roberto					
Ney					
Cecília					
Antônio					
Paulo					
Ivone					
Beth					

=== Top 8 ===
Contestant	Age	Hometown	Occupation	Result	Winnings
Astro Ribeiro	80	Caraguatatuba	Househusband	Winners on December 13	1
Pietro Coccaro	70	Colletorto, Italy	Retired	Winners on December 13	2
Nadja Celina	62	Maceió	Chemist	Runners-up on December 13	1
Sérgio Ferreira	61	São Paulo	Executive	Runners-up on December 13	1
Beth Coutinho	71	Jaboticatubas	Artist	Eliminated on December 6	1
Glaci Rosso	63	Curitiba	Psychologist	Eliminated on December 6	0
Helena Rodrigues	67	Araguari	Teacher	Eliminated on November 29	0
Ney Messias	60	Belém	Physical educator	Eliminated on November 22	0

== Elimination table ==
Place	Contestant	Episode						
Place	Contestant	2		3		4		5
1	Astro	IN	HIGH	IN	HIGH	IN	WIN	WINNERS
1	Pietro	IN	WIN	WIN	IMM	HIGH	IMM	WINNERS
2	Nadja	WIN	IMM	IN	LOW	IN	LOW	RUNNERS-UP
2	Sérgio	IN	IN	IN	HIGH	WIN	IMM	RUNNERS-UP
5	Beth	HIGH	IMM	IN	WIN	IN	ELIM	
6	Glaci	IN	IN	HIGH	IMM	ELIM		
7	Helena	IN	LOW	IN	ELIM			
8	Ney	IN	ELIM					

=== Key ===
- Winner
- Runner-up
- Individual challenge winner
- Individual challenge top entry
- Mystery Box bottom entry
- Team challenge winner
- Team challenge loser (PT)
- Immunity
- Immunity extra
- Saved first
- Saved last
- Eliminated

== Ratings and reception ==
=== Brazilian ratings ===
All numbers are in points and provided by Kantar Ibope Media.

Episode	Title	Air date	Timeslot (BRT)	SP viewers (in points)	BR viewers (in points)	Ref.
1	Top 20 – Auditions	November 15, 2022	Tuesday 10:45 p.m.	1.8	1.2	
2	Top 8	November 22, 2022	Tuesday 10:45 p.m.	1.9	1.2	
3	Top 7	November 29, 2022	Tuesday 10:45 p.m.	2.0	1.3	
4	Top 6	December 6, 2022	Tuesday 10:45 p.m.	1.9	1.2	
5	Winner announced	December 13, 2022	Tuesday 10:45 p.m.	1.7	1.2	

- In 2022, each point represents 258.821 households in 15 market cities in Brazil (74.666 households in São Paulo).
