= Petruș Gavrilă =

Romanian canoeist

Medal record

Men's sprint kayak

Representing Romania

European Championships
Silver medal – second place	2012 Zagreb	K-4 1000 m
Bronze medal – third place	2011 Belgrade	K-4 1000 m

Petruș Ionel Gavrilă (born 8 July 1988 in Fetești) is a Romanian sprint kayaker.

In the men's K-4 1000 m event, he won a silver medal at the 2012 Canoe Sprint European Championships in Zagreb (with Traian Neagu, Toni Ionel Ioneticu and Ștefan Vasile) and a bronze medal at the 2011 Canoe Sprint European Championships in Belgrade (also with Neagu, Ioneticu and Vasile).

At the 2012 Summer Olympics, he competed in the men's K-4 1000 metres, finishing in 8th place in the final with Traian Neagu, Toni Ioneticu and Ștefan Vasile.

At the 2015 European Games, Gavrilă competed in the men's K-4 1000 metres, finishing in 9th place in the final with Daniel Burciu, Constantin Mironescu and Valentin Cameneschi.
