= Adunații-Copăceni =

- Commune
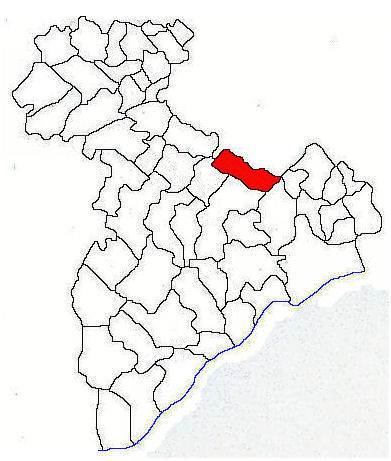
- Location in Giurgiu County

- Location in Romania
- Coordinates: 44°15′N 26°3′E
- Country: Romania
- County: Giurgiu

Government
  - Mayor (2020–2024): Daniel-Cezar Rusu (PNL)
- Area: 78.25 km^{2} (30.21 sq mi)
- Elevation: 79 m (259 ft)
- Population (2021-12-01): 6,881
  - Density: 87.94/km^{2} (227.8/sq mi)
- Time zone: UTC+02:00 (EET)
  - Summer (DST): UTC+03:00 (EEST)
- Postal code: 87005
- Area code: +(40) x46
- Vehicle reg.: GR
- Website: www.primariaadunatiicopaceni.ro

Adunații-Copăceni is a commune located in Giurgiu County, Muntenia, Romania. It is composed of four villages: Adunații-Copăceni, Dărăști-Vlașca, Mogoșești, and Varlaam.

The commune is situated in the southern part of the Wallachian Plain, on the banks of the Argeș River, at an altitude of 79 m (259 ft). It is located in the central part of Giurgiu County, on the border with Ilfov County.

The national road DN5 connects Adunații-Copăceni to the county seat, Giurgiu, 41 km (25 mi) to the south, and to the capital city, Bucharest, 21 km (13 mi) to the north. The DN5A road branches off in a southeasterly direction towards Varlaam and Mogoșești villages, ending in Hotarele commune, where it reaches DN41.

Historical population
Year	Pop.	±%
2002	6,693	—
2011	6,621	−1.1%
2021	6,881	+3.9%
Source: Census data

== Natives ==
- Toni Ioneticu (born 1989), sprint canoeist
