= Traian Neagu =

Romanian canoeist

Medal record

Men's sprint kayak

Representing Romania

European Championships
Silver medal – second place	2012 Zagreb	K-4 1000 m
Bronze medal – third place	2011 Belgrade	K-4 1000 m

Traian Neagu (born 3 January 1987 in Rosiorii de Vede) is a Romanian sprint kayaker. At the 2012 Summer Olympics, he competed in the Men's K-4 1000 metres, finishing in 8th place in the final (with Toni Ioneticu, Ştefan Vasile and Petruş Gavrilă).

At the Canoe Sprint European Championships, in the men's K-4 1000 m event (also with Ioneticu, Vasile and Gavrilă), Neagu won a silver medal in 2012 in Zagreb and a bronze medal in 2011 in Belgrade.
