= Toni Ioneticu =

Romanian canoeist

Medal record

Men's sprint kayak

Representing Romania

European Championships
Silver medal – second place	2012 Zagreb	K-4 1000 m
Bronze medal – third place	2011 Belgrade	K-4 1000 m

Toni Ionel Ioneticu (born 2 December 1989 in Adunații-Copăceni) is a Romanian sprint kayaker. At the 2012 Summer Olympics, he competed in the Men's K-4 1000 metres, with Traian Neagu, Ștefan Vasile and Petrus Gavrila, finishing in 8th place with the team in the final.

In the men's K-4 1000 m event, he won a silver medal at the 2012 Canoe Sprint European Championships in Zagreb (with Traian Neagu, Ştefan Vasile and Petruș Ionel Gavrilă) and a bronze medal at the 2011 Canoe Sprint European Championships in Belgrade (also with Neagu, Vasile and Gavrilă).
