= Nelson Henriques =

Angolan canoeist

Personal information
- Nationality: Angola
- Born: October 2, 1986 (age 39)
- Height: 168 cm (66 in)
- Weight: 67 kg (148 lb)

Sport
- Sport: Sprint Canoe
- Coached by: Francisco Freire
Medal record
Men's Sprint canoe
Representing Angola
All-Africa Games
Silver medal – second place	2011 Maputo	C-2 1000m

Nelson Henriques (born 2 October 1986, Luanda, Angola) is an Angolan sprint canoeist. At the 2012 Summer Olympics, he competed in the Men's C-1 200 metres and the Men's C-2 1000 metres (with Fortunato Pacavira).
