= Ștefan Vasile =

Romanian sprint canoer (born 1982)

Medal record

Men's sprint kayak

Representing Romania

European Championships
Silver medal – second place	2006 Račice	K-4 500 m
Silver medal – second place	2012 Zagreb	K-4 1000 m
Bronze medal – third place	2005 Poznań	K-4 500 m
Bronze medal – third place	2011 Belgrade	K-4 1000 m

Ștefan Vasile (born 17 February 1982) is a Romanian sprint kayaker who competed the mid-2000s.

Competing in the men's K-4 500 m event, Vasile won a silver medal at the 2006 Canoe Sprint European Championships in Račice (with Alexandru Ceaușu, Marian Baban and Alin Anton) and a bronze medal at the 2005 Canoe Sprint European Championships in Poznań (with Marian Baban, Alin Anton and Florean Mada).

In the men's K-4 1000 m event, he won a silver medal at the 2012 Canoe Sprint European Championships in Zagreb (with Traian Neagu, Toni Ionel Ioneticu and Petruș Ionel Gavrilă) and a bronze medal at the 2011 Canoe Sprint European Championships in Belgrade (also with Neagu, Ioneticu and Gavrilă).

Vasile also competed for Romania at the 2004 Summer Olympics in Athens, where he finished seventh in the men's K-4 1000 m event (with Marian Baban, Alexandru Ceauşu and Corneli Vasile Curuzan), while being eliminated in the semifinals of the men's K-2 500 m event (with Marian Baban). At the 2012 Summer Olympics in London, he finished eighth in the men's K-4 1000 m event (with Neagu, Ioneticu and Gavrilă).
