= Canoeing at the 2011 Pan American Games – Men's C-2 1000 metres =

Men's C-2 1000 metres at the 2011 Pan American Games
- Venue: Canoe & Rowing Course
- Dates: October 28
- Competitors: 12 from 6 nations

Medalists
Gold medal	Karel Aguilar Chacon; Serguey Torres	Cuba
Silver medal	Erlon Silva; Ronilson Oliveira	Brazil
Bronze medal	Ronny Ratia; Anderson Ramos	Venezuela

The men's C-2 1000 metres canoeing event at the 2011 Pan American Games was held on October 28 at the Canoe & Rowing Course in Ciudad Guzman.

== Schedule ==
All times are local Central Daylight Time (UTC−5)

Date	Time	Round
October 28, 2011	11:30	Final

== Results ==
=== Final ===
Rank	Rowers	Country	Time	Notes
1st place, gold medalist(s)	Karel Aguilar Chacon, Serguey Torres	Cuba	3:39.280	
2nd place, silver medalist(s)	Ronilson Oliveira, Erlon Silva	Brazil	3:40.482	
3rd place, bronze medalist(s)	Anderson Ramos, Ronny Ratia	Venezuela	3:40.990	
4	Miguel Castañeda, Everardo Cristóbal	Mexico	3:41.252	
5	Gabriel Beauchesne-Sévigny, Andrew Russell	Canada	3:56.489	
6	Carlos Escamilla, Jesús Escamilla	Colombia	4:08.258	
