= José Carlos Bulnes =

Cuban canoeist (born 1989)

Personal information
- Born: 29 August 1989 (age 37) Havana, Cuba

Sport
- Sport: Canoeing
Medal record
Representing Cuba
Pan American Games
Bronze medal – third place	2015 Toronto	C-2 1000m

José Carlos Bulnes (born 29 August 1989) is a Cuban sprint canoeist. At the 2012 Summer Olympics, he competed in the Men's C-2 1000 metres with Serguey Torres.
