= Michał Kudła =

Polish canoeist

Personal information
- Born: 17 October 1991 (age 34) Poznań, Poland
- Height: 188 cm (6 ft 2 in)
- Weight: 90 kg (198 lb)
Medal record
Men's caone sprint
Representing Poland
Summer Universiade
Bronze medal – third place	2013 Kazan	C-4 1000 m

Michał Kudła (born 17 October 1991) is a Polish canoeist. Born in Poznań, he competed for Poland at the 2016 Summer Olympics in the men's C-2 1000 metres and in the same event at the 2015 European Games, the 2019 European Games, and the 2019 ICF Canoe Sprint World Championships.
