= Canoeing at the 2010 South American Games – Men's C-2 200 metres =

The Men's C-2 200m event at the 2010 South American Games was held over March 29 at 10:20.

== Medalists ==
| Gold | Silver | Bronze |
|---|---|---|
| Ronilson Oliveira; Erlon Silva; Brazil | Eduyn Labarca; Edward Luciano Paredes; Venezuela | Johnnathan Francisco Quitral; Fabian Antonio Valdes; Chile |

== Results ==
| Rank | Athlete | Time |
|---|---|---|
| 1st place, gold medalist(s) | Brazil; Ronilson Oliveira; Erlon Silva | 40.58 |
| 2nd place, silver medalist(s) | Venezuela; Eduyn Labarca; Edward Luciano Paredes | 41.50 |
| 3rd place, bronze medalist(s) | Chile; Johnnathan Francisco Quitral; Fabian Antonio Valdes | 41.89 |
| 4 | Colombia; Anderson Ospina; Jesús Felipe Ospina | 42.69 |
| 5 | Argentina; Leonardo Niveiro; Roberto Palacios | 43.34 |
