= Balázs Adolf =

Hungarian canoeist (born 1999)

Personal information
- Born: 5 September 1999 (age 27) Budapest, Hungary
- Height: 1.88 m (6 ft 2 in)

Sport
- Country: Hungary
- Sport: Canoe sprint Canoe marathon
- Events: C-1 1000 m, C-1 5000 m
- Club: Óbudai Ganz VSE
Medal record
Representing Hungary
Men's canoe sprint
World Championships
Gold medal – first place	2021 Copenhagen	C-1 5000 m
Gold medal – first place	2023 Duisburg	C-1 5000 m
Gold medal – first place	2026 Poznań	C-1 5000 m
Silver medal – second place	2019 Szeged	C-1 5000 m
Silver medal – second place	2024 Samarkand	C-2 1000 m
Bronze medal – third place	2021 Copenhagen	C-1 1000 m
Bronze medal – third place	2024 Samarkand	C-1 5000 m
Bronze medal – third place	2025 Milan	C-1 1000 m
European Championships
Gold medal – first place	2024 Szeged	C-1 5000 m
Silver medal – second place	2022 Munich	C-1 5000 m
Silver medal – second place	2026 Montemor-o-Velho	C-1 5000 m
Bronze medal – third place	2022 Munich	C-2 1000 m
Men's canoe marathon
World Championships
Gold medal – first place	2021 Pitești	C-1
Gold medal – first place	2021 Pitești	C-1 short race
Bronze medal – third place	2025 Győr	C-1 short race

Balázs Adolf (born 5 September 1999) is a Hungarian sprint canoeist.

He won a medal at the 2019 ICF Canoe Sprint World Championships.

== Major results ==
=== Olympic Games ===
Year	C-1 1000	C-2 500	C-2 1000
2020	7 FB	—N/a	3 FB
2024	7	6	—N/a

=== World championships ===
Year	C-1 1000	C-1 5000	C-2 1000
2019		2nd place, silver medalist(s)	
2021	3rd place, bronze medalist(s)	1st place, gold medalist(s)	
2022	3 FB	5	
2023	5	1st place, gold medalist(s)	
2024	—N/a	3rd place, bronze medalist(s)	2nd place, silver medalist(s)
