= Erlon Silva =

Brazilian canoeist

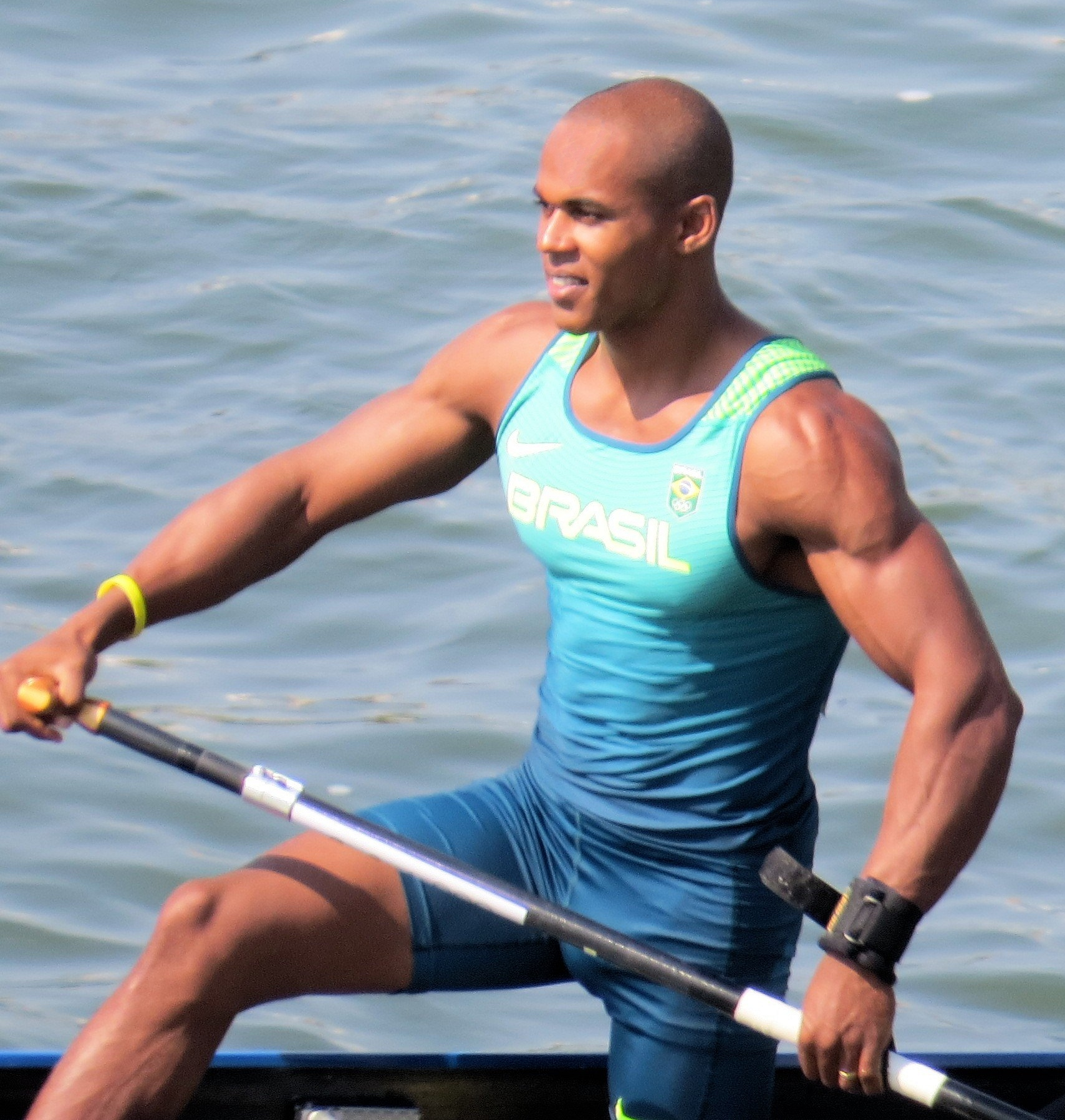
- Silva at the 2016 Summer Olympics

Personal information
- Born: 23 June 1991 (age 35) Ubatã, Brazil
- Height: 175 cm (5 ft 9 in)
- Weight: 78 kg (172 lb)

Sport
- Country: Brazil
- Sport: Sprint canoe
- Events: C-2 200 m, C-2 500 m, C-2 1000 m
- Club: Flamengo, Rio de Janeiro; Paulistano, São Paulo
- Coached by: Pedro Sena; Jesus Morlan
Medal record
Representing Brazil
Olympic Games
Silver medal – second place	2016 Rio de Janeiro	C-2 1000 m
World Championships
Gold medal – first place	2015 Milan	C-2 1000 m
Gold medal – first place	2018 Montemor-o-Velho	C-2 500 m
Bronze medal – third place	2014 Moscow	C-2 200 m
Bronze medal – third place	2019 Szeged	C-2 1000 m
Pan American Games
Silver medal – second place	2011 Guadalajara	C-2 1000 m
Silver medal – second place	2015 Toronto	C-2 1000 m
South American Games
Gold medal – first place	2010 Medellín	C-2 200 m
Gold medal – first place	2010 Medellín	C-2 500 m
Gold medal – first place	2010 Medellín	C-2 1000 m

Erlon de Souza Silva (born 23 June 1991) is a Brazilian sprint canoeist who competes in the 1000 m doubles event (C-2). He placed tenth at the 2012 Olympics and won a silver medal at the 2016 Rio Games. He won two more silver medals at the 2011 and 2015 Pan American Games and became a world champion in 2015.

== Career ==
In 2014, de Souza Silva won a World Championship bronze medal in the men's C2 200 m with Isaquias Queiroz. A year later, that team won World Championship gold in the C2 1000 m.

This team also won a silver medal at the 2016 Olympics in the C2 1000 m.

At the following World Championships, the team were unable to defend their title, finishing in 4th place in the final. In 2018, Silva and Queiroz won World Championship gold again, this time in the C2 500 m.

In 2019, the team won World Championship bronze, this time at the C2 1000 m.

A hip injury prevented Silva from attending the 2020 Summer Olympics, forcing Jacky Godmann to take his place as Queiroz's partner.

== Personal life ==
Silva took up canoeing aged 14 in his native Ubatã, but later moved to Rio de Janeiro and São Paulo. He is married to Rosangela.
