= Alex Haas =

Australian canoeist

Alexander Haas (born 11 February 1995) is an Australian sprint canoeist. At the 2012 Summer Olympics, he competed in the Men's C-2 1000 metres.
