= Mariusz Kujawski =

Polish canoeist (born 1986)

Personal information
- Born: 17 November 1986 (age 39) Chełmża
- Height: 183 cm (6 ft 0 in)
- Weight: 87 kg (192 lb)
Medal record
Men's kayak sprint
Representing Poland
Event	1st	2nd	3rd
Olympic Games	0	0	0
World Championships	0	1	0
European Championships	0	1	0
European Games	0	0	0
Universiade	1	1	1
Total	1	2	2
World Championships
Silver medal – second place	2007 Duisburg	K-2 1000 m
European Championships
Bronze medal – third place	2013 Montemor-o-Velho	K-2 500 m
Universiade
Gold medal – first place	2013 Kazan	K-2 1000 m
Silver medal – second place	2013 Kazan	K-2 500 m
Bronze medal – third place	2013 Kazan	K-4 500 m

Mariusz Kujawski (born 17 November 1986) is a Polish sprint canoer who has competed since the late 2000s. He won a silver medal in the K-2 1000 m event at the 2007 ICF Canoe Sprint World Championships in Duisburg.

Kujawski finished fourth in the K-2 1000 m event at the 2008 Summer Olympics in Beijing, but was changed to disqualified upon Adam Seroczyński's testing for positive for clenbuterol in a doping test.
