= Pavlo Borsuk =

Ukrainian canoeist (born 2001)

Sport
- Country: Ukraine
- Sport: Canoe sprint
- Event: C–2 1000 m
Medal record
Men's canoe sprint
Representing Ukraine
World Championships
Bronze medal – third place	2024 Samarkand	C–2 1000 m

Pavlo Borsuk is a Ukrainian sprint canoeist. He is a 2024 ICF Canoe Sprint World Championships bronze medalist.

== Career ==
Borsuk made his international debut at the 2019 ICF World Junior and U23 Canoe Sprint Championships and won a silver medal in the junior C–1 200 metres event. He competed at the 2022 ICF World Junior and U23 Canoe Sprint Championships and won a silver medal in the C–2 1000 metres event.

In August 2024, he competed at the 2024 ICF Canoe Sprint World Championships and won a bronze medal in the C–2 1000 metres event with a time of 3:42.433.

== Major results ==
=== World championships ===
Year	C-2 1000
2023	8
2024	3rd place, bronze medalist(s)
