= Fortunato Luis Pacavira =

Angolan sprint canoer (born 1978)

Personal information
- Nationality: Angola
- Born: 27 July 1978 (age 47)
- Height: 171 cm (67 in)
- Weight: 70 kg (150 lb)

Sport
- Sport: Sprint Canoe
Medal record
Men's Sprint canoe
Representing Angola
All-Africa Games
Silver medal – second place	2011 Maputo	C-2 1000m

Fortunato Luis Pacavira (born 27 July 1978) is an Angolan sprint canoer who competed in the late 2000s. At the 2008 Summer Olympics in Beijing, he was eliminated in the heats of the C-1 500 m event and the semifinals of the C-1 1000 m event. At the 2012 Summer Olympics, he was eliminated in the semi-final of the C-1 1000 m event, and in the semi-final of the C-2 1000 m event, where he competed with Nelson Henriques.
