= Ivan Dmitriev (canoeist) =

Russian canoeist (born 1998)

Sport
- Country: Russia
- Sport: Canoe sprint
- Event(s): C–2 1000 m, C–1 5000 m
Medal record
Men's canoe sprint
Representing ANA
World Championships
Gold medal – first place	2024 Samarkand	C–2 1000 m

Ivan Dmitriev is a Russian canoeist. He is a 2024 ICF Canoe Sprint World Championships gold medalist.

== Career ==
Dmitriev made his international debut at the 2016 ICF World Junior and U23 Canoe Sprint Championships and won a gold medal in the junior C-2 1000 metres event.

In August 2024, Dmitriev competed at the 2024 ICF Canoe Sprint World Championships and won a gold medal in the C–2 1000 metres event with a time of 3:41.510. He and his partner, Zakhar Petrov, only had two days to prepare together for the event, since Petrov was competing at the 2024 Summer Olympics.

== Major results ==
=== World championships ===
Year	C-1 5000	C-2 1000
2024	6	1st place, gold medalist(s)
