= Jaroslav Radoň =

Czech canoeist

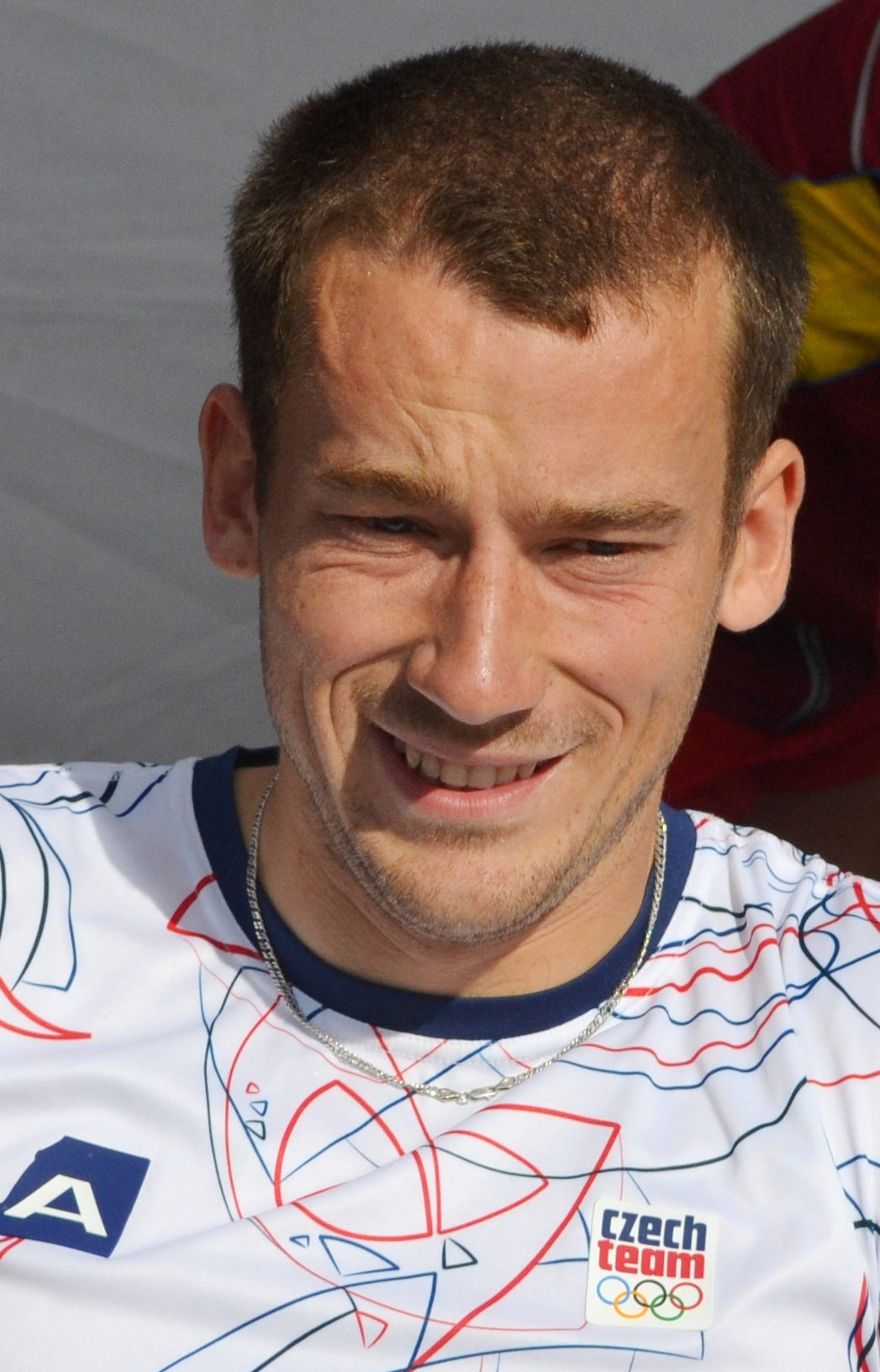
- Radoň in 2013

Personal information
- Born: 3 September 1986 (age 39) Kutná Hora, Czechoslovakia
Medal record
Men's sprint canoeing
Representing Czech Republic
World Championships
Bronze medal – third place	2013 Duisburg	C-2 1000 m
Bronze medal – third place	2013 Duisburg	C-2 500 m
European Championships
Gold medal – first place	2012 Zagreb	C-2 500 m
Bronze medal – third place	2014 Brandenburg	C-2 1000 m
Universiade
Silver medal – second place	2013 Kazan	C-2 200 m
Silver medal – second place	2013 Kazan	C-2 500 m
Silver medal – second place	2013 Kazan	C-2 1000 m

Jaroslav Radoň (Czech pronunciation: [ˈjaroslaf ˈradoɲ]; born 3 September 1986 in Kutná Hora) is a Czech sprint canoeist. At the 2012 Summer Olympics, he competed in the Men's C-2 1000 metres, together with Filip Dvořák, finishing 5th.
