= Aliaksandr Bahdanovich =

Belarusian canoeist and politician

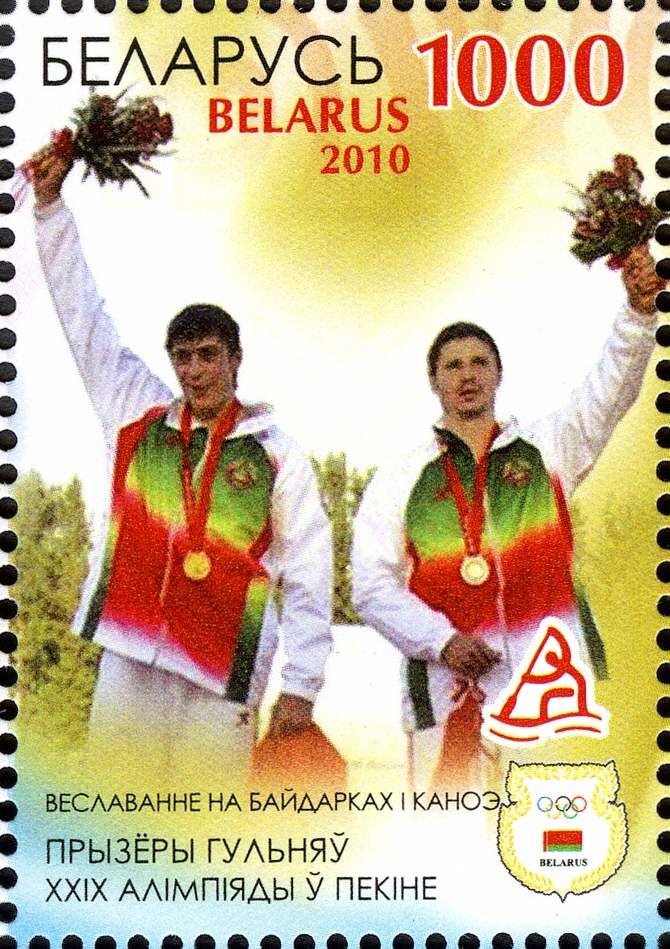
- Andrei and Aliaksandr Bahdanovich (right) on a 2010 Belarusian stamp

Personal information
- Born: 29 April 1982 (age 44) Mahilyow, Byelorussian SSR, Soviet Union
- Height: 1.91 m (6 ft 3 in)
- Weight: 97 kg (214 lb)

Sport
- Sport: Canoe sprint
- Club: Dynamo Babruysk, Dynamo Mahilyow
Medal record
Men's canoe sprint
Representing Belarus
Olympic Games
Gold medal – first place	2008 Beijing	C-2 1000 m
Silver medal – second place	2012 London	C-2 1000 m
World Championships
Gold medal – first place	2009 Dartmouth	C-4 200 m
Silver medal – second place	2001 Poznań	C-4 1000 m
Silver medal – second place	2010 Poznań	C-2 1000 m
Bronze medal – third place	2002 Seville	C-4 1000 m
Bronze medal – third place	2005 Zagreb	C-4 200 m
Bronze medal – third place	2006 Szeged	C-4 1000 m
European Championships
Silver medal – second place	2011 Belgrade	C-2 1000 m
Silver medal – second place	2011 Belgrade	C-4 1000 m
Bronze medal – third place	2012 Zagreb	C-2 1000 m
European Games
Gold medal – first place	2015 Baku	C-2 1000 m

Aliaksandr Viktaravich Bahdanovich (Belarusian: Аляксандр Віктаравіч Багдановіч, born 29 April 1982) is a Belarusian sprint canoeist. Competing in three Summer Olympics, he won a gold medal in the C-2 1000 m event at Beijing in 2008 together with Andrei Bahdanovich. They won silver in the same event in the 2012 Summer Olympics in London. At the 2004 Games, he finished sixth in the C-2 500 m event, rowing with Aleksandr Kurlyandchik.

Bahdanovich also won six medals at the ICF Canoe Sprint World Championships with a gold (C-4 200 m: 2009), two silvers (C-2 1000 m: 2010, C-4 1000 m: 2001) and three bronzes (C-4 200 m: 2005, C-4 1000 m: 2002, 2006).
