= Canoeing at the 2010 South American Games – Men's C-2 500 metres =

The Men's C-2 500m event at the 2010 South American Games was held over March 28 at 10:20.

== Medalists ==
Gold	Silver	Bronze
Ronilson de Oliveira; Erlon Silva; Brazil	Eduyn Labarca; Edward Luciano Paredes; Venezuela	Anderson Ospina; Jesús Felipe Ospina; Colombia

== Results ==
Rank	Athlete	Time
1st place, gold medalist(s)	Brazil; Ronilson de Oliveira; Erlon Silva	1:46.45
2nd place, silver medalist(s)	Venezuela; Eduyn Labarca; Edward Luciano Paredes	1:47.67
3rd place, bronze medalist(s)	Colombia; Anderson Ospina; Jesús Felipe Ospina	1:48.40
4	Chile; Johnnathan Francisco Quitral; Alvaro Dario Raguileo	1:53.82
5	Argentina; Leonardo Niveiro; Roberto Palacios	1:58.21
