= Canoeing at the 2012 Summer Olympics – Men's C-2 1000 metres =

Men's canoe sprint C-2 1,000 metres at the Games of the XXX Olympiad
- Venue: Eton Dorney
- Date: 7 to 9 August
- Competitors: 24 from 12 nations
- Winning time: 3:33.804

Medalists
| 1st place, gold medalist(s) | | Peter Kretschmer; Kurt Kuschela | Germany |
| 2nd place, silver medalist(s) | | Andrei Bahdanovich; Aliaksandr Bahdanovich | Belarus |
| 3rd place, bronze medalist(s) | | Alexey Korovashkov; Ilya Pervukhin | Russia |

The men's canoe sprint C-2 1,000 metres at the 2012 Olympic Games in London took place between 7 and 9 August at Eton Dorney.

German pairing Peter Kretschmer and Kurt Kuschela won the gold medal. Belarus won silver and Russia took bronze.

== Competition format ==
The competition comprised heats, semi-finals, and a final round. Heat winners advanced to the 'A' final, with all other boats getting a second chance in the semi-finals. The top three from each semifinal also advanced to the 'A' final, and competed for medals. A placing 'B' final was held for the other semi-finalists.

== Schedule ==
All times are British Summer Time (UTC+01:00)

| Date | Time | Round |
|---|---|---|
| Tuesday 7 August 2012 | 09:46; 10:55 | Heats; Semifinals |
| Thursday 9 August 2012 | 09:30 | Finals |

== Results ==
=== Heats ===
The fastest boat qualified for the final, remainder went through to the semi-finals.

==== Heat 1 ====
| Rank | Canoer | Country | Time | Notes |
|---|---|---|---|---|
| 1 | Peter Kretschmer; Kurt Kuschela | Germany | 3:34.435 | Q |
| 2 | Alexey Korovashkov; Ilya Pervukhin | Russia | 3:37.568 | |
| 3 | Huang Maoxing; Li Qiang | China | 3:38.483 | |
| 4 | Jaroslav Radoň; Filip Dvořák | Czech Republic | 3:38.711 | |
| 5 | Marcin Grzybowski; Tomasz Kaczor | Poland | 3:38.759 | |
| 6 | Alex Haas; Jake Donaghey | Australia | 3:52.589 | |

==== Heat 2 ====
| Rank | Canoer | Country | Time | Notes |
|---|---|---|---|---|
| 1 | Sergiy Bezugliy; Maksim Prokopenko | Azerbaijan | 3:38.042 | Q |
| 2 | Erlon Silva; Ronilson Oliveira | Brazil | 3:41.014 | |
| 3 | Andrei Bahdanovich; Aliaksandr Bahdanovich | Belarus | 3:42.599 | |
| 4 | Alexandru Dumitrescu; Victor Mihalachi | Romania | 3:43.787 | |
| 5 | Serguey Torres; José Carlos Bulnes | Cuba | 3:44.341 | |
| 6 | Fortunato Pacavira; Nelson Henriques | Angola | 4:16.478 | |

=== Semifinals ===
The fastest three canoeists in each semi-final qualified for the 'A' final. The slowest two canoeists in each semi-final qualified for the placing 'B' final.

==== Semifinal 1 ====
| Rank | Canoer | Country | Time | Notes |
|---|---|---|---|---|
| 1 | Alexey Korovashkov; Ilya Pervukhin | Russia | 3:36.456 | Q |
| 2 | Andrei Bahdanovich; Aliaksandr Bahdanovich | Belarus | 3:36.540 | Q |
| 3 | Alexandru Dumitrescu; Victor Mihalachi | Romania | 3:36.551 | Q |
| 4 | Marcin Grzybowski; Tomasz Kaczor | Poland | 3:37.695 | |
| 5 | Alex Haas; Jake Donaghey | Australia | 3:52.018 | |

==== Semifinal 2 ====
| Rank | Canoer | Country | Time | Notes |
|---|---|---|---|---|
| 1 | Huang Maoxing; Li Qiang | China | 3:37.746 | Q |
| 2 | Jaroslav Radoň; Filip Dvořák | Czech Republic | 3:37.839 | Q |
| 3 | Serguey Torres; José Carlos Bulnes | Cuba | 3:41.619 | Q |
| 4 | Erlon Silva; Ronilson Oliveira | Brazil | 3:42.101 | |
| 5 | Fortunato Pacavira; Nelson Henriques | Angola | 4:18.543 | |

=== Finals ===
==== Final B ====
| Rank | Canoer | Country | Time | Notes |
|---|---|---|---|---|
| 1 | Marcin Grzybowski; Tomasz Kaczor | Poland | 3:37.692 | |
| 2 | Erlon Silva; Ronilson Oliveira | Brazil | 3:41.484 | |
| 3 | Alex Haas; Jake Donaghey | Australia | 3:50.782 | |
| 4 | Fortunato Pacavira; Nelson Henriques | Angola | 4:15.497 | |

==== Final A ====
| Rank | Canoer | Country | Time | Notes |
|---|---|---|---|---|
| 1st place, gold medalist(s) | Peter Kretschmer; Kurt Kuschela | Germany | 3:33.804 | |
| 2nd place, silver medalist(s) | Andrei Bahdanovich; Aliaksandr Bahdanovich | Belarus | 3:35.206 | |
| 3rd place, bronze medalist(s) | Alexey Korovashkov; Ilya Pervukhin | Russia | 3:36.414 | |
| 4 | Sergiy Bezugliy; Maksim Prokopenko | Azerbaijan | 3:37.219 | |
| 5 | Jaroslav Radoň; Filip Dvořák | Czech Republic | 3:37.601 | |
| 6 | Serguey Torres; José Carlos Bulnes | Cuba | 3:42.357 | |
| 7 | Alexandru Dumitrescu; Victor Mihalachi | Romania | 3:43.005 | |
| 8 | Huang Maoxing; Li Qiang | China | 3:48.930 | |
