= Ubatã =

Coordinates: 14°12′S 39°31′W

- Municipality
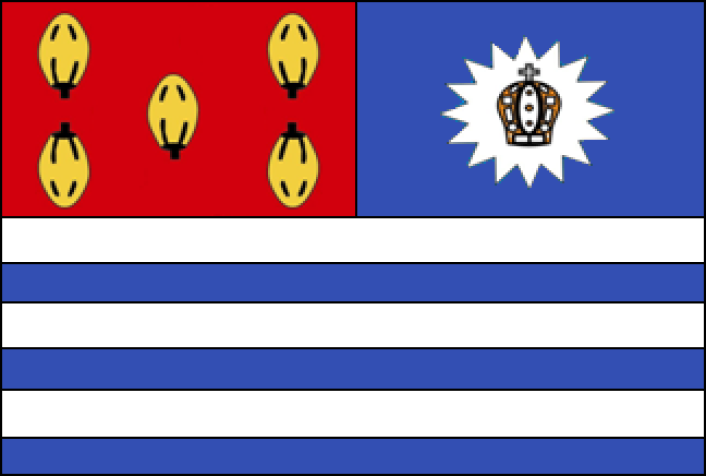
- Flag Coat of arms

- Country: Brazil
- Region: Nordeste
- State: Bahia

Population (2020)
  - Total: 27,263
- Time zone: UTC−3 (BRT)

Ubatã is a municipality in the state of Bahia in the North-East region of Brazil.

== See also ==
- List of municipalities in Bahia
