= Kurt Kuschela =

German canoeist

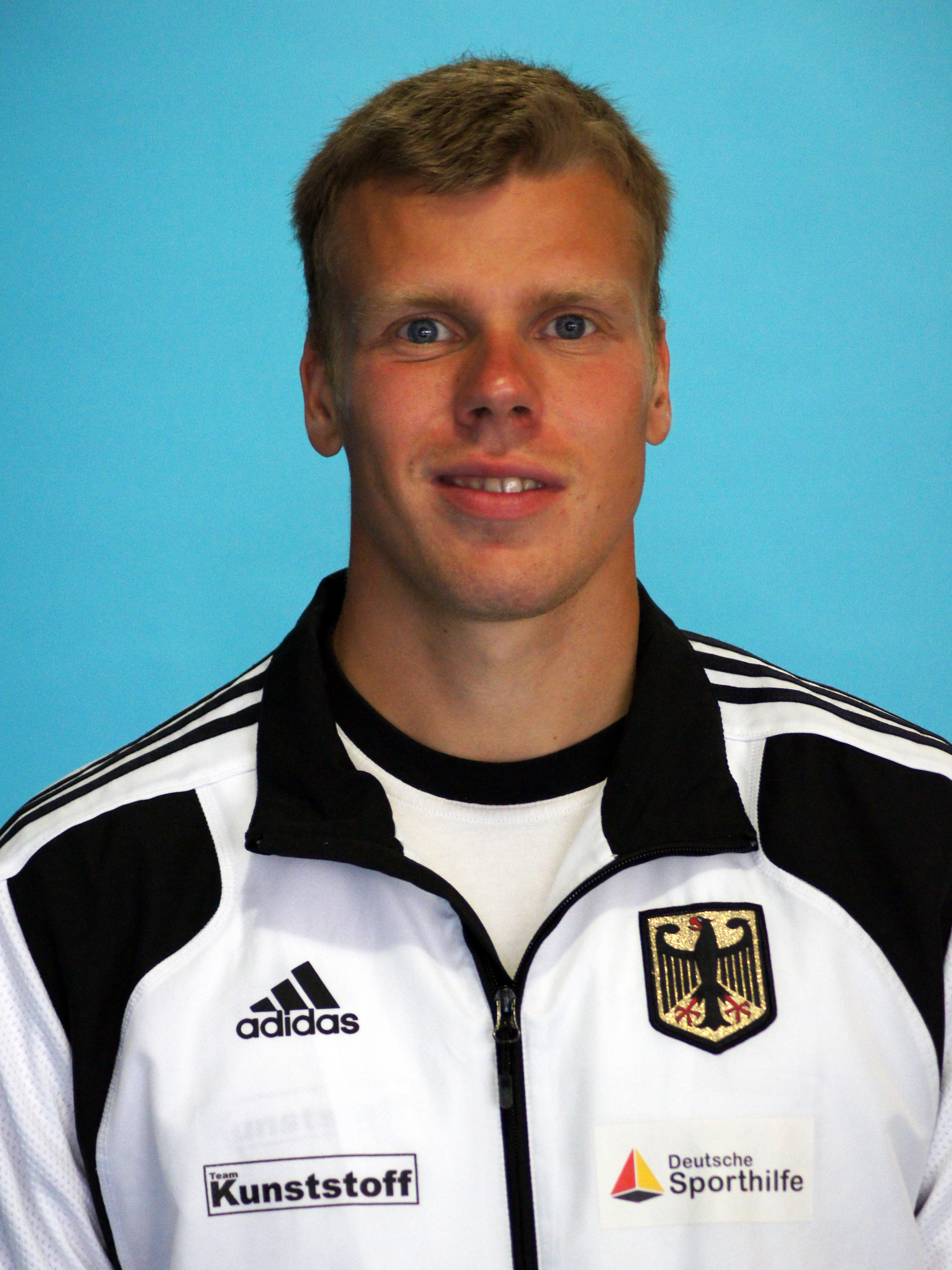

Personal information
- Born: 30 September 1988 (age 37) Berlin, Germany
Medal record
Men's canoe sprint
Representing Germany
Olympic Games
Gold medal – first place	2012 London	C-2 1000 m
World Championships
Gold medal – first place	2013 Duisburg	C-4 1000 m
Bronze medal – third place	2011 Szeged	C-2 500 m

Kurt Kuschela (born 30 September 1988 in Berlin) is a German sprint canoeist. He won the gold medal in the 2012 Summer Olympics in C-2 1000 metres category event for his country with his teammate Peter Kretschmer.
