= Tomasz Kaczor =

Polish sprint canoeist

Personal information
- Nationality: Polish
- Born: 4 August 1989 (age 37) Poznań, Poland
- Height: 1.84 m (6 ft 0 in)
- Weight: 84 kg (185 lb)

Sport
- Country: Poland
- Sport: Canoe sprint
- Events: C-1 500 m, C–1 1000 m, C-2 500 m
- Club: KS Warta Poznan
Medal record
Men's canoe sprint
Representing Poland
World Championships
Silver medal – second place	2019 Szeged	C-1 1000 m
European Games
Gold medal – first place	2019 Minsk	C-1 1000 m
European Championships
Silver medal – second place	2015 Račice	C-1 1000 m
Bronze medal – third place	2013 Montemor-o-Velho	C-2 500 m
Bronze medal – third place	2014 Brandenburg	C-2 500 m
Bronze medal – third place	2017 Plovdiv	C-1 500 m
Universiade
Bronze medal – third place	2013 Kazan	C-2 500 m
Bronze medal – third place	2013 Kazan	C-2 1000 m

Tomasz Kaczor (born 4 August 1989) is a Polish sprint canoeist. At the 2012 Summer Olympics, he competed in the Men's C-2 1000 metres with Marcin Grzybowski. At the 2016 Olympics, he competed in the C-1 200 m and the C-1 1000 m.
