= Mateusz Kamiński =

Polish canoeist (born 1991)

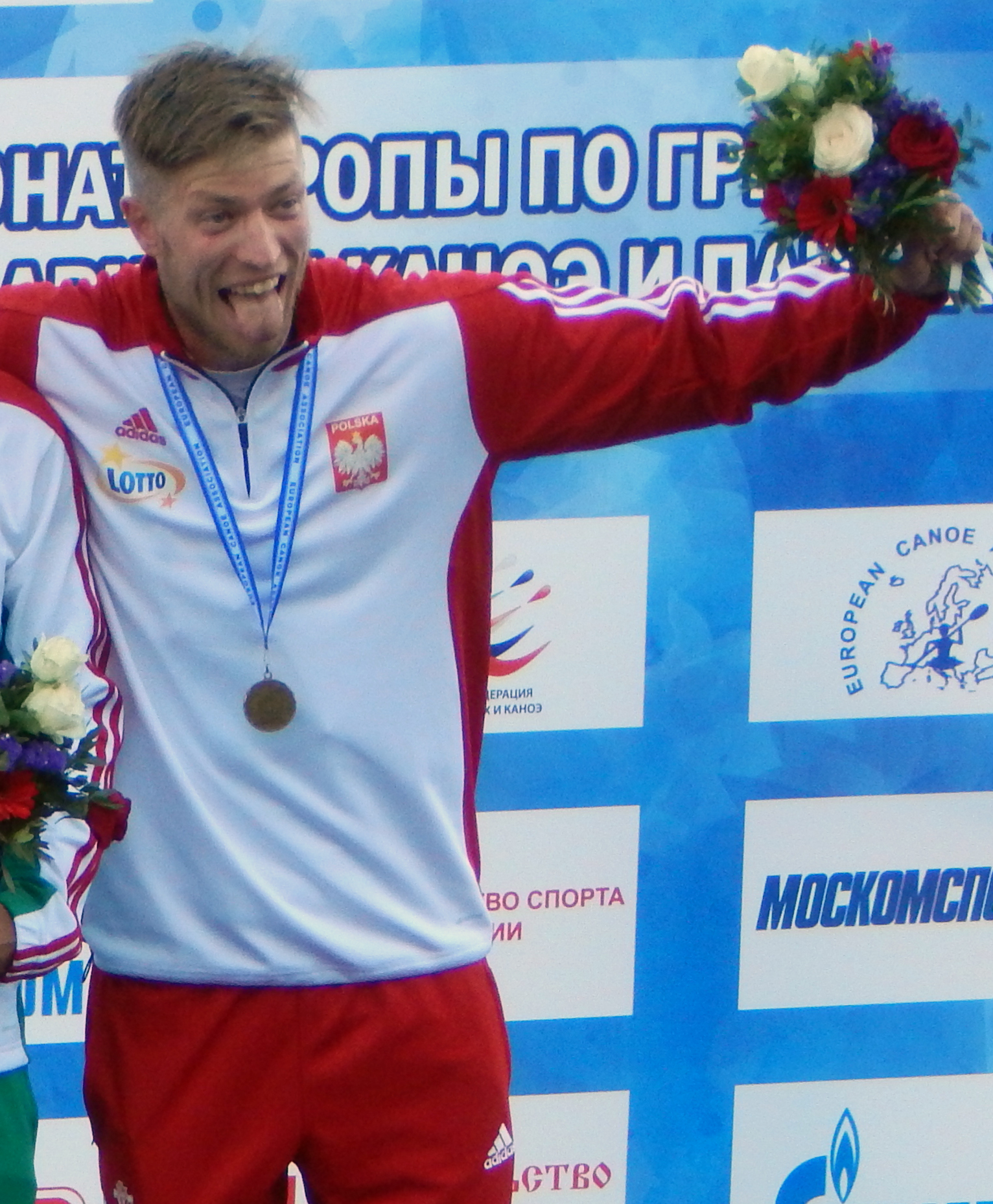

Personal information
- Nationality: Polish
- Born: 3 May 1991 (age 35) Olsztyn, Poland

Sport
- Country: Poland
- Sport: Canoe sprint
Medal record
Men's canoe sprint
Representing Poland
World Championships
Bronze medal – third place	2015 Milan	C–1 5000 m
Bronze medal – third place	2017 Račice	C-1 5000 m
Men's canoe marathon
World Championships
Bronze medal – third place	2011 Singapore	C-2
Bronze medal – third place	2022 Ponte de Lima	C-1 short race
European Championships
Silver medal – second place	2022 Silkeborg	C-1 short race

Mateusz Kamiński (born 3 May 1991) is a Polish canoeist. He competed in the men's C-2 1000 metres event at the 2016 Summer Olympics.
