= Tamás Kiss (canoeist) =

Hungarian canoeist (born 1987)

Medal record

Men's canoe sprint

Representing Hungary

Olympic Games
Bronze medal – third place	2008 Beijing	C-2 1000 m

World Championships
Bronze medal – third place	2014 Moscow	C-4 1000 m
Bronze medal – third place	2015 Milan	C-4 1000 m

European Championships
Silver medal – second place	2014 Brandenburg	C-4 1000 m
Gold medal – first place	2016 Moscow	C-1 5000 m

Summer Universiade
Gold medal – first place	2013 Kazan	C-1 1000 m

Men's canoe marathon

World Championships
Bronze medal – third place	2013 Copenhagen	C-1 28 km

World Games
Silver medal – second place	2013 Cali	C-1 11 km

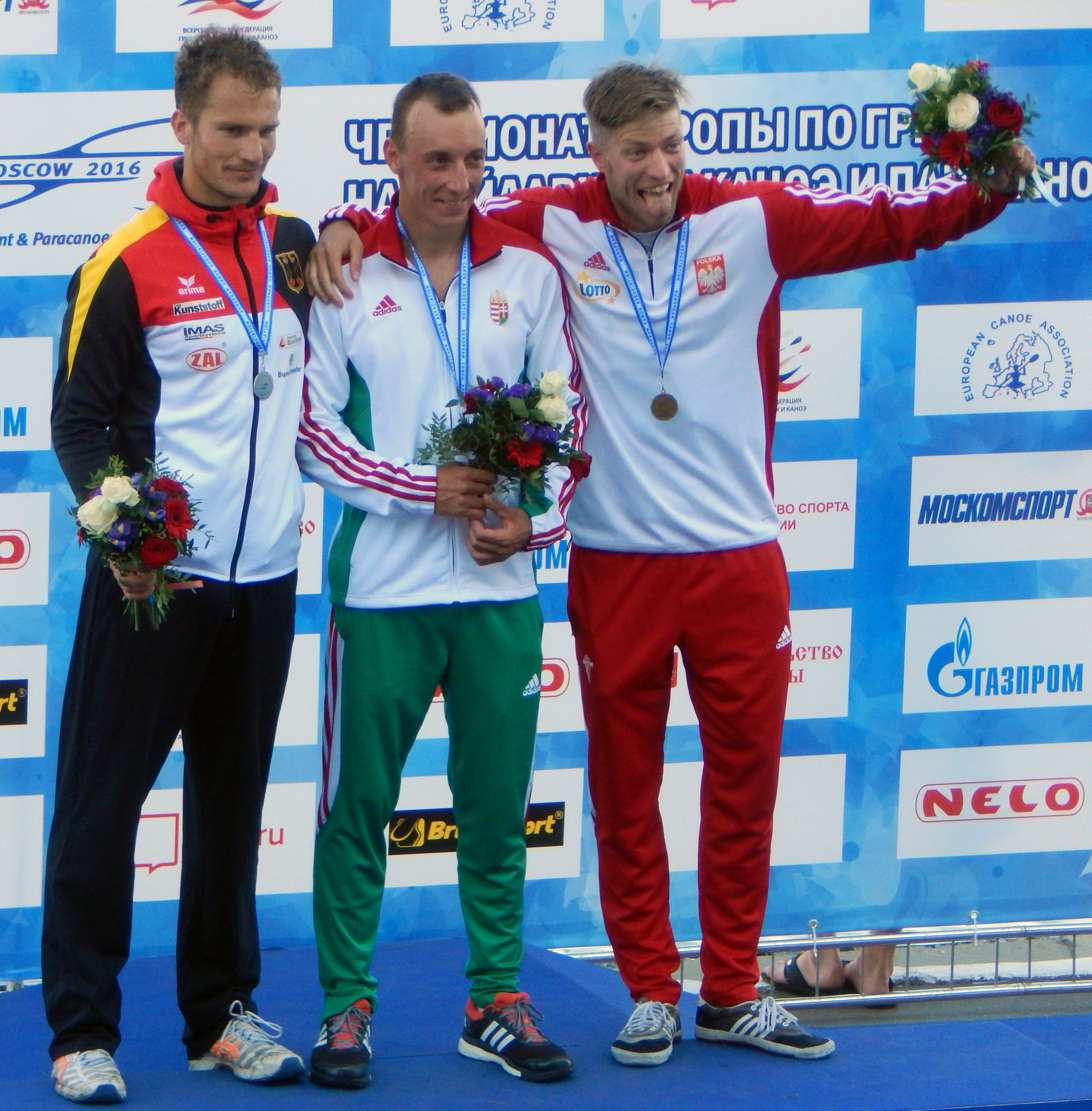
Tamas wins a gold medal at the 2016 European Championships

Tamás Kiss (born 9 May 1987 in Ajka) is a Hungarian sprint canoeist and marathon canoeist who has competed since the late 2000s. At the 2008 Summer Olympics in Beijing, he won a bronze medal in the C-2 1000 m event with teammate György Kozmann.

Kiss was a last-minute replacement in the Hungarian team for the 2008 Olympics after the sudden death of two-time Olympic champion György Kolonics while he was preparing for his fifth Olympics. He teamed up with Kolonics's former partner György Kozmann a mere one month before the games, and in Beijing, exceeding expectations, the pair finished in third place in the C-2 1000 m final.

== Awards and honours ==
=== Orders and special awards ===
- Cross of Merit of the Republic of Hungary – Gold Cross (2008)
