= Filip Dvořák (canoeist) =

Czech canoeist

Personal information
- Born: 30 July 1988 (age 37) Prague, Czechoslovakia
Medal record
Men's sprint canoeing
Representing Czech Republic
World Championships
Bronze medal – third place	2013 Duisburg	C-2 1000 m
Bronze medal – third place	2013 Duisburg	C-2 500 m
European Championships
Gold medal – first place	2012 Zagreb	C-2 500 m
Bronze medal – third place	2014 Brandenburg	C-2 1000 m
Universiade
Silver medal – second place	2013 Kazan	C-2 200 m
Silver medal – second place	2013 Kazan	C-2 500 m
Silver medal – second place	2013 Kazan	C-2 1000 m

Filip Dvořák (born 30 July 1988 in Prague) is a Czech sprint canoeist and marathon canoeist. At the 2012 Summer Olympics, he competed in the Men's C-2 1000 metres, together with Jaroslav Radoň, finishing 5th. Dvořák and Radoň also won two bronzes at the 2013 World Championships. At the 2016 Olympics, the pair again competed in the C-2 1000 m.

He is grandson of Bedřich Dvořák and son of Libor Dvořák.
