= Kirill Shamshurin =

Russian canoeist (born 1990)

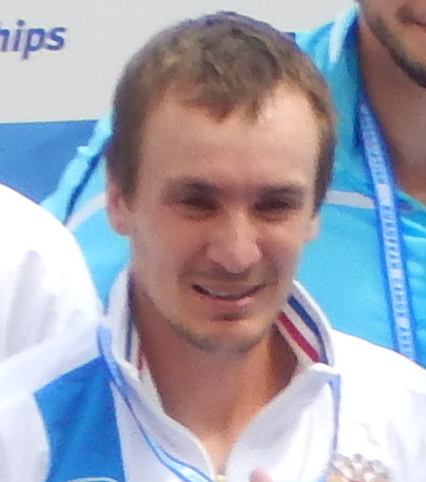

Personal information
- Nationality: Russian
- Born: 14 May 1990 (age 36) Tiraspol, Moldova
- Height: 1.78 m (5 ft 10 in)
- Weight: 77 kg (170 lb)

Sport
- Country: Russia
- Sport: Canoe sprint
- Club: Moscow Region Centre of Olympic Sports/Dynamo
Medal record
Representing Russia
Men's canoe sprint
World Championships
Gold medal – first place	2014 Moscow	C-4 1000 m
Gold medal – first place	2021 Copenhagen	C-2 1000 m
Bronze medal – third place	2018 Montemor-o-Velho	C-1 5000 m
Bronze medal – third place	2018 Montemor-o-Velho	C-2 1000 m
Bronze medal – third place	2021 Copenhagen	C-1 5000 m
European Games
Silver medal – second place	2019 Minsk	C-1 1000 m
Bronze medal – third place	2019 Minsk	C-2 1000 m
European Championships
Gold medal – first place	2010 Trasona	C-4 1000 m
Gold medal – first place	2015 Račice	C-4 1000 m
Gold medal – first place	2016 Moscow	C-4 1000 m
Silver medal – second place	2018 Belgrade	C-1 5000 m
Silver medal – second place	2021 Poznań	C-2 1000 m
Bronze medal – third place	2011 Belgrade	C-4 1000 m
Bronze medal – third place	2017 Plovdiv	C-1 1000 m
Bronze medal – third place	2017 Plovdiv	C-4 1000 m
Bronze medal – third place	2021 Poznań	C-1 1000 m
Men's canoe marathon
World Championships
Bronze medal – third place	2019 Shaoxing	C-1

Kirill Andreyevich Shamshurin (Russian: Кирилл Андреевич Шамшурин; born 14 May 1990) is a Russian sprint canoeist. He participated at the 2018 ICF Canoe Sprint World Championships.
