= Oleg Tarnovschi =

Moldovan canoeist (born 1992)

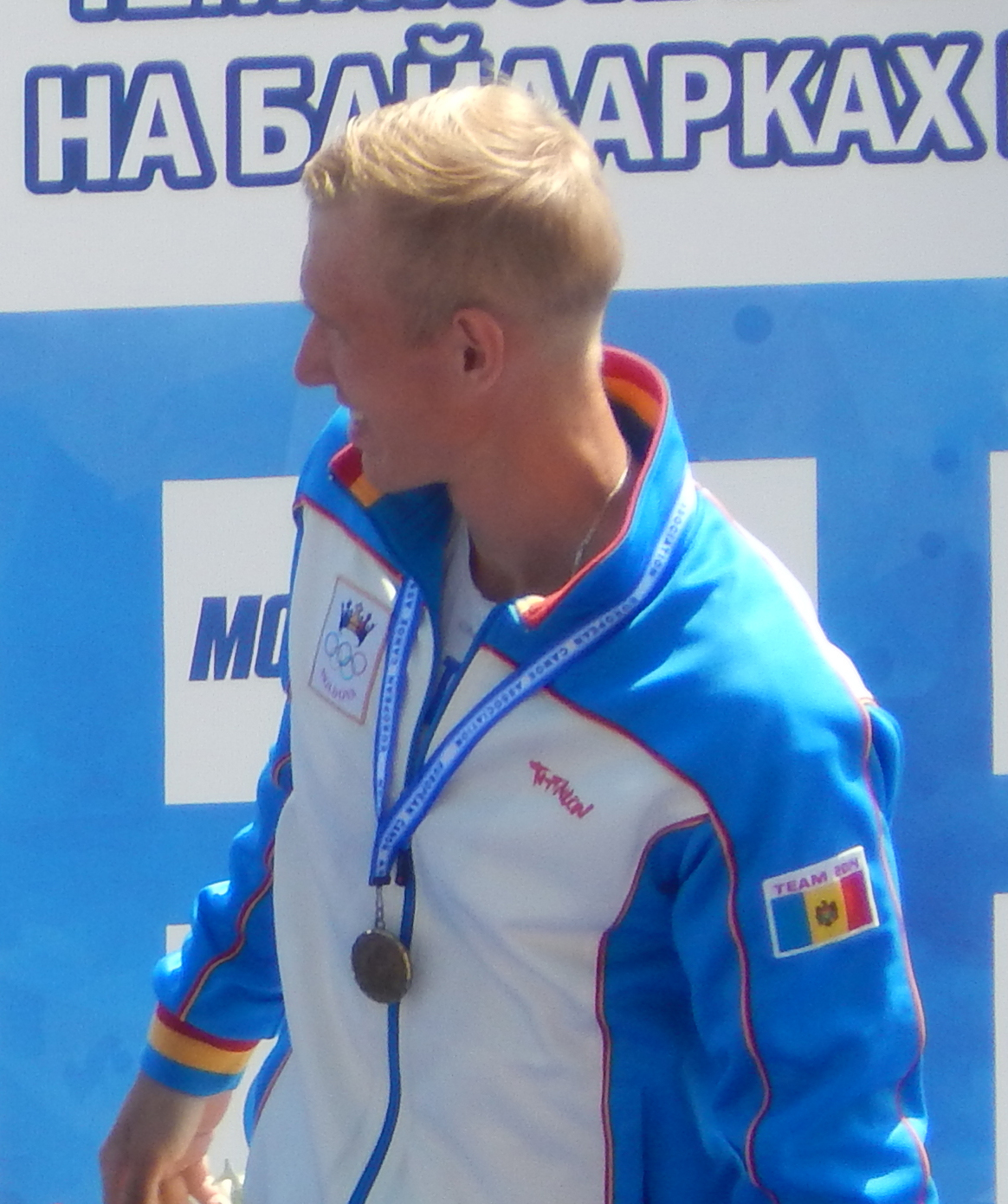

Personal information
- Nationality: Moldovan
- Born: 10 April 1992 (age 34) Lviv, Ukraine
- Height: 1.81 m (5 ft 11 in)
- Weight: 80 kg (176 lb)

Sport
- Country: Moldova
- Sport: Canoe sprint
- Event: C-1 500 m
Medal record
Men's canoe sprint
Representing Moldova
World Championships
Silver medal – second place	2015 Milan	C-1 500 m
Bronze medal – third place	2019 Szeged	C-1 500 m
Bronze medal – third place	2021 Copenhagen	C-1 500 m
European Championships
Silver medal – second place	2017 Plovdiv	C-1 500 m
Bronze medal – third place	2016 Moscow	C-1 500 m
Bronze medal – third place	2018 Belgrade	C-1 500 m
Bronze medal – third place	2024 Szeged	C-2 1000 m
Bronze medal – third place	2025 Racice	C-4 Mix 500 m

Oleg Tarnovschi (Ukrainian: Олег Тарновський; born 10 April 1992) is a Ukrainian and Moldovan sprint canoeist. He competed in the men's C-1 200 metres event at the 2016 Summer Olympics.
