= Carlo Tacchini =

Italian canoeist (born 1995)

Personal information
- Born: 25 January 1995 (age 31) Verbania, Italy
- Height: 1.76 m (5 ft 9 in)
- Weight: 73 kg (161 lb)

Sport
- Country: Italy
- Sport: Canoe sprint
- Club: Fiamme Oro
Medal record
Men's canoe sprint
Representing Italy
Olympic Games
Silver medal – second place	2024 Paris	C-2 500m
World Championships
Silver medal – second place	2017 Račice	C-1 500 m
Bronze medal – third place	2021 Copenhagen	C-1 500 m
European Games
Gold medal – first place	2023 Kraków-Małopolska	C-2 500m
European Championships
Gold medal – first place	2023 Kraków	C-2 500 m
Gold medal – first place	2024 Szeged	C-2 1000 m
Gold medal – first place	2025 Racice	C-2 500 m
Bronze medal – third place	2018 Belgrade	C-1 1000 m
Bronze medal – third place	2018 Belgrade	C-1 5000 m
Bronze medal – third place	2021 Poznań	C-1 5000 m
Bronze medal – third place	2022 Munich	C-1 1000 m
Bronze medal – third place	2022 Munich	C-1 5000 m
Bronze medal – third place	2024 Szeged	C-2 500 m
Bronze medal – third place	2025 Racice	C-1 5000 m

Carlo Tacchini (born 25 January 1995) is an Italian sprint canoeist. He competed in the men's C-1 1000 metres and in the men's C-1 200 metres event at the 2016 Summer Olympics.
