= List of 2009 World Games medal winners =

The 2009 World Games were held in Kaohsiung, Taiwan, from July 16 to July 26, 2009.

== Acrobatic gymnastics ==
Event	Gold	Silver	Bronze
Men's pair	Ukraine; Mykola Shcherbak; Serhiy Popov	Russia; Alexei Dudchenko; Konstantin Pilipchuk	Great Britain; Douglas Fordyce; Edward Upcott
Men's group	China; Fang Sheng; Han Youliang; Xue Wangxin; Zhao Yuchao	Great Britain; Adam Buckingham; Adam McAssey; Jonathan Stranks; Alex Uttley	Ukraine; Andriy Bilozor; Denys Kriuchkov; Andrii Lytvak; Roman Urazbakiyev
Women's pair	Belgium; Tatjana De Vos; Florence Henrist	Azerbaijan; Ayla Ammadova; Dilara Sultanova	Great Britain; Mollie Grehan; Maiken Thorne
Women's group	Russia; Ekaterina Loginova; Aigul Shaikhutdinova; Ekaterina Stroynova	Great Britain; Rebecca Richardson; Candice Slater; Beth Young	Ukraine; Kateryna Kalyta; Yuliya Odintsova; Natalia Vinnik
Mixed pair	United States; Michael Rodrigues; Kristin Allen	Belgium; Menno Vanderghote; Julie Van Gelder	Great Britain; Nicholas Illingworth; Katie Axten

== Aerobic gymnastics ==
Event	Gold	Silver	Bronze
Men's individual	Iván Parejo; Spain	Morgan Jacquemin; France	Aleksandr Kondratichev; Russia
Women's individual	Marcela Lopez; Brazil	Angela McMillan; New Zealand	Huang Jinxuan; China
Mixed pair	France; Julien Chaninet; Aurélie Joly	Spain; Vicente Lli; Sara Moreno	China; He Shijian; Huang Jinxuan
Trio	Romania; Mircea Brînzea; Valentin Mavrodineanu; Mircea Zamfir	China; Tao Le; Che Lei; Zhang Peng	France; Benjamin Garavel; Nicolas Garavel; Morgan Jacquemin
Group	China; Che Lei; He Shijian; Ni Zhenhua; Tao Le; Yu Wei; Zhang Peng	Romania; Laura Cristache; Corina Constantin; Nadina Hotca; Cristina Nedelcu; Anca Surdu; Cristina Antonescu	Russia; Ruslan Farakshatov; Aleksandr Kondratichev; Mikhail Nazariev; Anton Shishigin; Arseny Tikhomirov; Igor Trushkov

== Artistic roller skating ==
Event	Gold	Silver	Bronze
Men's free skating	Carles Gasset; Spain	Roberto Riva; Italy	Marcel Stürmer; Brazil
Women's free skating	Tanja Romano; Italy	Nika Arčon; Slovenia	Monika Lis; Germany
Pairs	Italy; Matteo Guarise; Sara Venerucci	United States; Robert Hines; Audrey Orcutt	Germany; Hannes Muschol; Christiane Reich
Dance	Italy; Gabriele Gasparini; Enrica Gasparini	Spain; Oscar Molins; Ayelén Morales	United States; Jonathan Cross; Erin Ovens

== Bodybuilding ==
Event	Gold	Silver	Bronze
Men's 70 kg	Kim Byung-soo; South Korea	Vyacheslav Makogon; Ukraine	Masahiro Sue; Japan
Men's 75 kg	Boo Chang-soon; South Korea	Igor Kočiš; Slovakia	Huang Chien-chih; Chinese Taipei
Men's 80 kg	None awarded	Hsu Chung-huang; Chinese Taipei	Masashi Suzuki; Japan
Men's 85 kg	Lee Jin-ho; South Korea	None awarded	Mohamed Kotb; Egypt
Men's +85 kg	None awarded	None awarded	Peter Tatarka; Slovakia
Women's 55 kg	Jana Purdjaková; Slovakia	Alina Čepurnienė; Lithuania	Nataliia Dichkovska; Ukraine
Women's fitness	Alevtyna Titarenko; Ukraine	Diana Almeida; Brazil	Anna Urbaníková; Slovakia

== Boules sports ==
Event	Gold	Silver	Bronze
Men's lyonnaise precision	Gianfranco Santoro; Croatia	Emanuele Ferrero; Italy	Markica Dodig; Bosnia and Herzegovina
Men's lyonnaise progressive	Aleš Borčnik; Slovenia	Alessandro Longo; Italy	Sébastien Mourgues; France
Men's pétanque doubles	France; Damien Hureau; Julien Lamour	Belgium; Fabrice Uytterhoeven; William Van der Biest	Thailand; Pakin Phukram; Supan Thongphoo
Men's raffa doubles	Italy; Pasquale D'Alterio; Gianluca Formicone	Argentina; Raúl Basualdo; Francisco Spessot	Brazil; Milton Schmitz; Rafael Vanz Borges
Women's lyonnaise precision	Yang Ying; China	Magali Jouve; France	Paola Mandola; Italy
Women's lyonnaise progressive	Cheng Xiping; China	Laurence Essertel; France	Chiara Soligon; Italy
Women's pétanque doubles	Thailand; Kannika Limwanich; Suphannee Wongsut	France; Nadège Baussian; Ranya Kouadri	Israel; Margalit Ossi; Gali Shriki
Women's raffa doubles	Italy; Loana Capelli; Elisa Luccarini	Brazil; Noeli Dalla Corte; Ingrid Schulz	Turkey; Deniz Demir; Rukiye Yüksel

== Bowling ==
Event	Gold	Silver	Bronze
Men's singles	Manuel Otálora; Colombia	Wu Siu Hong; Hong Kong	Adrian Ang; Malaysia
Women's singles	Krista Pöllänen; Finland	Zara Glover; Great Britain	Liza del Rosario; Philippines
Mixed doubles	South Korea; Kong Byoung-hee; Gye Min-young	Colombia; Manuel Otálora; Anggie Ramírez	Malaysia; Adrian Ang; Zatil Iman

== Canoe polo ==
Event	Gold	Silver	Bronze
Men	France; François Barbey; Martin Brodoux; Thibault Chanuc; Manuel Courtin; Yves-Marie Denis; Maxime Gohier; Philippe Pfister; Nathan Souviraa	Netherlands; Robert Aitken; Thomas Bartels; Jeroen Dieperink; Jurjen Hallegraeff; Hagen Oligmüller; Wouter Ottjes; Michiel Schreurs; Paul Snijders	Australia; Duncan Cochrane; Chris Heard; Anton Holmes; Josh Holmes; Craig Hutchinson; Ian McIntosh; Matt Moore; Nathan Moore
Women	Great Britain; Zoe Anthony; Pru Blyth; Ellie Bridgestock; Ginny Coyles; Pip Grayson; Kathryn Grieves; Charlotte Lister; Kirsty Sutcliffe	Germany; Alexandra Bonk; Stefanie Esser; Elena Gilles; Tonie Lenz; Tanja Manegold; Christina Mantell; Caroline Sinsel; Regina Weinberger	France; Mélanie Biémont; Virginie Brackez; Annie Chevalier; Gaëlle François; Camille Girard; Justine Lefebvre; Valérie Sibioude; Jade Vassallo

== Cue sports ==
Event	Gold	Silver	Bronze
Men's three-cushion carom	Dick Jaspers; Netherlands	Torbjörn Blomdahl; Sweden	Marco Zanetti; Italy
Men's nine-ball pool	Ralf Souquet; Germany	Yang Ching-shun; Chinese Taipei	Stephan Cohen; France
Men's snooker	Nigel Bond; Great Britain	David Grace; Great Britain	Mohammed Shehab; United Arab Emirates
Women's nine-ball pool	Allison Fisher; Great Britain	Jasmin Ouschan; Austria	Lin Yuan-chun; Chinese Taipei

== Dancesport ==
Event	Gold	Silver	Bronze
Standard	Italy; Paolo Bosco; Silvia Pitton	Germany; Benedetto Ferruggia; Claudia Köhler	Russia; Marat Gimaev; Alina Basyuk
Latin	Russia; Alexey Silde; Anna Firstova	Slovenia; Jurij Batagelj; Jagoda Štrukelj	Italy; Gabriele Goffredo; Antonia Goffredo
Rock 'n' Roll	France; Christophe Payan; Kathy Richeta	Russia; Ivan Yudin; Olga Sbitneva	Russia; Ivan Klimov; Katrin Gazazyan

== Field archery ==
Event	Gold	Silver	Bronze
Men's recurve	Vic Wunderle; United States	Michele Frangilli; Italy	Sebastian Rohrberg; Germany
Men's compound	Kevin Wilkey; United States	Alessandro Lodetti; Italy	Chris White; Great Britain
Men's barebow	Giuseppe Seimandi; Italy	Pasi Ahjokivi; Finland	Sergio Cassiani; Italy
Women's recurve	Carole Ferriou; France	Jessica Tomasi; Italy	Naomi Folkard; Great Britain
Women's compound	Petra Göbel; Austria	Ingeborg Enthoven; Netherlands	Ivana Buden; Croatia
Women's barebow	Eleonora Strobbe; Italy	Christine Gauthé; France	Monika Jentges; Germany

== Finswimming ==
Event	Gold	Silver	Bronze
Men's 100 m surface	Miao Jingwei; China	Dmytro Sydorenko; Ukraine	Andrea Nava; Italy
Men's 200 m surface	Stefano Figini; Italy	Andrea Nava; Italy	You Gyeong-heon; South Korea
Men's 400 m surface	Stefano Figini; Italy	Sven Lützkendorf; Germany	Dénes Kanyó; Hungary
Men's 50 m apnoea	Igor Soroka; Ukraine	Evgeny Skorzhenko; Russia	Lee Kwan-ho; South Korea
Men's 4 × 100 m surface relay	Ukraine; Viktor Panov; Dmytro Shekera; Igor Soroka; Dmytro Sydorenko	Italy; Stefano Figini; Cesare Fumarola; Gianluca Mancini; Andrea Nava	Russia; Andrey Burakov; Pavel Kulakov; Nikolay Reznikov; Evgeny Skorzhenko
Women's 100 m surface	Zhu Baozhen; China	Liang Yaoyue; China	Camille Heitz; France
Women's 100 m surface	Zhu Baozhen; China	Liang Yaoyue; China	Choi Sae-rom; South Korea
Women's 200 m surface	Vasilisa Kravchuk; Russia	Valeriya Baranovskaya; Russia	Olga Shlyakhovska; Ukraine
Women's 400 m surface	Vasilisa Kravchuk; Russia	Liu Jiao; China	Olga Shlyakhovska; Ukraine
Women's 50 m apnoea	Zhu Baozhen; China	Xu Huanshan; China	Yana Kasimova; Russia
Women's 4 × 100 m surface relay	China; Li Jing; Liang Yaoyue; Xu Yichuan; Zhu Baozhen	South Korea; Choi Sae-rom; Jang Ye-sol; Jeon Ah-ram; Kim Hyeon-jin	Russia; Valeriya Baranovskaya; Medeya Dzhavakhishvili; Yana Kasimova; Vasilisa Kravchuk

== Fistball ==
Event	Gold	Silver	Bronze
Men	Brazil; Andreas Treichel; Cristian Kohlmann; Luiz Karwowski; Gabriel Araújo; João Fidelis; Jean Andrioli; João Carlos Schmidt; George Schuch	Switzerland; Cyrill Schreiber; Marco Baumann; Cyrill Jäger; Stefan Ziegler; Manuel Sieber; David Berger; Lukas Lässer; Marcel Eicher	Austria; Dietmar Weiß; Christian Koller; Harald Pühringer; David Lorenz; Robert Tapler; Klemens Kronsteiner; Christian Zöttl; Siegfried Simon

== Flying disc ==
Event	Gold	Silver	Bronze
Mixed ultimate	United States; Chelsea Putnam; Gwen Ambler; Cara Crouch; Gabe Saunkeah; Seth Wiggins; Sam Chatterton-Kirchmeier; Cate Foster; Alicia White; Jon Remucal; Bart Watson; Deb Cussen; Beau Kittredge; Dylan Tunnell	Japan; Sachiko Sameshima; Satoshi Senda; Yuki Mori; Masashi Kurono; Ayumi Fujioka; Masahiro Matsuno; Eri Hirai; Moe Sameshima; Yohei Abe; Satoro Sameshima; Asami Ishitsu; Kei Sasakawa; Mizuho Tanaka	Australia; Mike Neild; Lauren Brown; Katie Bradstock; Anthony Dowle; Tim Lavis; Diana Worman; Matthew Dowle; Ash Martens; Jonno Holmes; Pete Gardner; Keah Molomby; Peter Blakeley; Liz Edye

== Inline hockey ==
Event	Gold	Silver	Bronze
Men	United States; Eric Keene; Brandon Barnette; Peter Messina; Jon Mosenson; Mike Urbano; Dustin Roux; Josh Laricchia; Keith Diprima; Greg Thompson; Chris Connole; Travis Fudge	France; Julien Thomas; Karl Gabillet; Vincent Charbonneau; Jérémy Lapresa; Jean-François Ladonne; Renaud Crignier; Jimi Lefranc; Romain Horrut; Orlando Cudicio; Alexis Gomane; Terry Lefranc; Geoffroy Tijou; Hugo Rebuffet; Benoît Ladonne	Czech Republic; Petr Hrachovina; Petr Veselý; Petr Šinágl; Jan Besser; David Balázs; Pavel Strýček; Aleš Zacha; Daniel Tvrzník; Ladislav Vlček; Martin Tvrzník; Tomáš Ulrich; Jiří Novotný; Pavel Zavrtálek; Martin Altrichter

== Inline speed skating ==
Event	Gold	Silver	Bronze
Men's 300 m time trial	Lo Wei-lin; Chinese Taipei	Andrés Felipe Muñoz; Colombia	Pedro Causil; Colombia
Men's 500 m sprint	Andrés Felipe Muñoz; Colombia	Lo Wei-lin; Chinese Taipei	Lee Myung-kyu; South Korea
Men's 1000 m sprint	Pedro Causil; Colombia	Alexis Contin; France	Claudio Naselli; Italy
Men's 10000 m points elimination	Yann Guyader; France	Nelson Garzón; Colombia	Daniel Álvarez; Venezuela
Men's 15000 m elimination	Jorge Luis Cifuentes; Colombia	Yann Guyader; France	Andrés Felipe Muñoz; Colombia
Women's 300 m time trial	Huang Yu-ting; Chinese Taipei	Hsu Chiao-jen; Chinese Taipei	Lim Jin-seon; South Korea
Women's 500 m sprint	Huang Yu-ting; Chinese Taipei	Lim Jin-seon; South Korea	Jercy Puello; Colombia
Women's 1000 m sprint	Huang Yu-ting; Chinese Taipei	Hsu Chiao-jen; Chinese Taipei	Nicole Begg; New Zealand
Women's 10000 m points elimination	Woo Hyo-sook; South Korea	Marta Ramírez; Colombia	Nicole Begg; New Zealand
Women's 15000 m elimination	Woo Hyo-sook; South Korea	Marta Ramírez; Colombia	Pan Yi-chin; Chinese Taipei

== Ju-jitsu ==
Event	Gold	Silver	Bronze
Men's duo	Switzerland; Remo Müller; Pascal Müller	Germany; Richard Hohenacker; Juri Hatzenbühler	France; Aurélien Dubois; Jordane Dubois
Men's fighting 69 kg	Julien Boussuge; France	Mathias Willard; Denmark	Fedor Serov; Russia
Men's fighting 77 kg	Igor Rudnev; Russia	Mario Staller; Germany	Percy Kunsa; France
Men's fighting 85 kg	Andreas Kuhl; Germany	Dmitry Nebolsin; Russia	Matthias Gastgeb; Austria
Men's fighting 94 kg	Rob Haans; Netherlands	Sergey Kunashov; Russia	Vincent Parisi; France
Women's duo	Austria; Maria Schreil; Marion Tremel	Italy; Sara Paganini; Linda Ragazzi	France; Patricia Floquet; Isabelle Bacon
Women's fighting 55 kg	Annabelle Reydy; France	Li Ching-yi; Chinese Taipei	Aizhan Kukuzova; Kazakhstan
Women's fighting 62 kg	Sabrina Hatzky; Germany	Yang Hsien-tzu; Chinese Taipei	Irene Baars; Netherlands
Women's fighting 70 kg	Mélanie Lavis; France	Lindsay Wyatt; Netherlands	Sonja Kinz; Germany
Mixed duo	France; Nicolas Péréa; Aurore Péréa	Switzerland; David Wernli; Joëlle Kempf	Belgium; Yazid Dalaa; Wendy Driesen

== Karate ==
Event	Gold	Silver	Bronze
Men's kata	Luca Valdesi; Italy	Vu Duc Minh Dack; France	Antonio Díaz; Venezuela
Men's kumite 60 kg	Douglas Brose; Brazil	Hsia Wen-huang; Chinese Taipei	Danil Domdjoni; Croatia
Men's kumite 65 kg	Ádám Kovács; Hungary	William Rollé; France	Ömer Kemaloğlu; Turkey
Men's kumite 70 kg	Jean Carlos Peña; Venezuela	Shinji Nagaki; Japan	Tamer Abdelraouf; Egypt
Men's kumite 75 kg	Georgios Tzanos; Greece	Diego Vandeschrick; Belgium	Ko Matsuhisa; Japan
Men's kumite 80 kg	Huang Hao-yun; Chinese Taipei	Islamutdin Eldaruchev; Russia	Konstantinos Papadopoulos; Greece
Men's kumite +80 kg	Jonathan Horne; Germany	Spyridon Margaritopoulos; Greece	Almir Cecunjanin; Montenegro
Men's kumite openweight	Khalid Khalidov; Kazakhstan	Hany Shakr; Egypt	Almir Cecunjanin; Montenegro
Women's kata	Nguyễn Hoàng Ngân; Vietnam	María Dimitrova; Dominican Republic	Sara Battaglia; Italy
Women's kumite 53 kg	Jelena Kovačević; Croatia	Chen Yen-hui; Chinese Taipei	Gülderen Çelik; Turkey
Women's kumite 60 kg	Maria Sobol; Russia	Eva Medveďová-Tulejová; Slovakia	Chang Ting; Chinese Taipei
Women's kumite +60 kg	Arnela Odžaković; Bosnia and Herzegovina	Tiffany Fanjat; France	Silvia Sperner; Germany
Women's kumite openweight	Eva Medveďová-Tulejová; Slovakia	Letitia Carr; New Zealand	Ema Aničić; Croatia

== Korfball ==
Event	Gold	Silver	Bronze
Mixed	Netherlands; Bregtje van Drongelen; Henriëtte Brandsma; Roxanna Detering; Kim Cocu; Eva Sprangers; Suzanne Struik; Mirjam Maltha; Tim Bakker; Jos Roseboom; Rick Voorneveld; Gerald van Dijk; André Kuipers; Leon Simons; Casper Boom	Belgium; Sara Goossens; Annelies Vandenberghe; Annick Dekeyser; Patty Peeters; Britt Logisse; Ann Vorsselmans; Veronique Biot; Bart Cleyman; Mitch Lenaerts; Jens Van Hoof; Dennis Vermeiren; David Peeters; Jeffrey Campers; Davor Duronjic	Chinese Taipei; Chou Hsiang-ju; Liang Ko-hsin; Chu Shu-ping; Lin Szu-yu; Chao Yen-ling; Lin Hsiu-yun; Luo Wan-yao; Wu Chun-hsien; Chiu Chih-yi; Huang Ling-fan; Kuo Chia-hao; Chang Kuo-en; Hung Kuan-ju; Lin Shih-chieh

== Lifesaving ==
Event	Gold	Silver	Bronze
Men's 200 m obstacle	Zhang Enjian; China	Federico Pinotti; Italy	Benjamin Bilski; Germany
Men's 50 m manikin carry	Federico Pinotti; Italy	Florian Laclaustra; France	Giovanni Legnani; Italy
Men's 100 m manikin carry fins	Simone Procaccia; Italy	Zhang Jiawen; China	Nicola Ferrua; Italy
Men's 100 m rescue medley	Federico Pinotti; Italy	Giovanni Legnani; Italy	Andrew Bowden; Australia
Men's surf race	Chris Allum; Australia	Glenn Anderson; New Zealand	Federico Pinotti; Italy
Men's board race	Dan Moodie; New Zealand	Hugh Dougherty; Australia	Shannon Eckstein; Australia
Men's ocean	Shannon Eckstein; Australia	Hugh Dougherty; Australia	Ryan Brennan; South Africa
Men's team overall	Italy; Nicola Ferrua; Diego Giuglar; Giovanni Legnani; Federico Pinotti; Simone Procaccia; Germano Proietti	Australia; Chris Allum; Andrew Bowden; Hugh Dougherty; Shannon Eckstein; Luke Harper; Mitchell Parkes	Shared silver
Men's team overall	Italy; Nicola Ferrua; Diego Giuglar; Giovanni Legnani; Federico Pinotti; Simone Procaccia; Germano Proietti	New Zealand; Glenn Anderson; John Gatfield; Mike Janes; Steven Kent; Dan Moodie; Matt Sutton	Shared silver
Women's 200 m obstacle	Lu Ying; China	Yang Jieqiao; China	Yang Chin-kuei; Chinese Taipei
Women's 50 m manikin carry	Isabella Cerquozzi; Italy	Gao Yuting; China	He Qian; China
Women's 100 m manikin carry fins	Song Jianrong; China	Huang Jiefen; China	Marcella Prandi; Italy
Women's 100 m rescue medley	Gao Yuting; China	Sarah Windsor; Australia	He Qian; China
Women's surf race	Kristyl Smith; Australia	Naomi Flood; Australia	Ayla Dunlop-Barrett; New Zealand
Women's board race	Nikki Cox; New Zealand	Naomi Flood; Australia	Madison Boon; New Zealand
Women's ocean	Naomi Flood; Australia	Kristyl Smith; Australia	Nikki Cox; New Zealand
Women's team overall	Germany; Katrin Altmann; Fabienne Göller; Aline Hundt; Stephanie Kasperski; Julia Schatz; Stefanie Schoder	Australia; Naomi Flood; Felysia Konakoff; Jennifer Parry; Kristyl Smith; Terri Sullivan; Sarah Windsor	China; Gao Yuting; He Qian; Huang Jiefen; Lu Ying; Song Jianrong; Yang Jieqiao
Women's team overall	Germany; Katrin Altmann; Fabienne Göller; Aline Hundt; Stephanie Kasperski; Julia Schatz; Stefanie Schoder	Australia; Naomi Flood; Felysia Konakoff; Jennifer Parry; Kristyl Smith; Terri Sullivan; Sarah Windsor	Italy; Isabella Cerquozzi; Marta Mozzanica; Chiara Pidello; Marcella Prandi; Elena Prelle

== Orienteering ==
Event	Gold	Silver	Bronze
Men's sprint	Andrey Khramov; Russia	Daniel Hubmann; Switzerland	Tero Föhr; Finland
Men's middle distance	Daniel Hubmann; Switzerland	Dmitry Tsvetkov; Russia	Andrey Khramov; Russia
Women's sprint	Minna Kauppi; Finland	Johanna Allston; Australia	Elise Egseth; Norway
Women's middle distance	Johanna Allston; Australia	Minna Kauppi; Finland	Linnea Gustafsson; Sweden
Mixed relay	Russia; Dmitry Tsvetkov; Yulia Novikova; Andrey Khramov; Galina Vinogradova	Finland; Pasi Ikonen; Bodil Holmström; Tero Föhr; Minna Kauppi	Norway; Lars Skjeset; Mari Fasting; Øystein Kvaal Østerbø; Elise Egseth

== Parachuting ==
Event	Gold	Silver	Bronze
Accuracy landing	Stefan Wiesner; Germany	Róbert Juriš; Slovakia	Liubov Ekshikeeva; Russia
Canopy piloting	Jay Moledzki; Canada	Nick Batsch; United States	Marat Leiras; Brazil
Canopy formation	United States; Chris Gay; Liz Godwin; Mark Gregory	Russia; Sergey Kulakov; Igor Pugachev; Sergey Vibe	Australia; Craig Bennett; Julia McConnel; Michael Vaughan
Freeflying	France; Cathy Bouette; Frédéric Fugen; Vincent Reffet	Norway; Håvard Flaat; Mathias Holtz; Kristian Moxnes	Great Britain; Mikey Carpenter; Alberto Fuertes; Adam Mattacola
Formation skydiving	United States; Andy Delk; Craig Girard; Mark Kirkby; Steve Nowak; Eliana Rodriguez	Russia; Michael Kuznetsov; Vladimir Pavlenko; Andrey Seliverstov; Oleg Shalamykhin; Sergey Shenin	France; Guillaume Bernier; Mathieu Bernier; Julien Degen; Fabrice Rieu; Jérémie Rollett

== Powerlifting ==
Event	Gold	Silver	Bronze
Men's lightweight	Hsieh Tsung-ting; Chinese Taipei	Arkadiy Shalokha; Ukraine	Hassan El-Belghitti; France
Men's middleweight	Jarosław Olech; Poland	Andriy Naniev; Ukraine	Jan Wegiera; Poland
Men's heavyweight	Sergiy Pevnev; Ukraine	Jacek Wiak; Poland	Anibal Coimbra; Luxembourg
Men's super heavyweight	Mike Tuchscherer; United States	Oleksandr Shepel; Ukraine	Valeriy Karpov; Ukraine
Women's lightweight	Chen Wei-ling; Chinese Taipei	Yukako Fukushima; Japan	Sri Hartati; Indonesia
Women's middleweight	Noviana Sari; Indonesia	Tetyana Prymenchuk; Ukraine	Zhanna Ivanova; Ukraine
Women's heavyweight	Larysa Soloviova; Ukraine	Antonietta Orsini; Italy	Priscilla Ribic; United States
Women's super heavyweight	Iryna Yavorska; Ukraine	Jessica O'Donnell; United States	Chang Ya-wen; Chinese Taipei

== Racquetball ==
Event	Gold	Silver	Bronze
Men's singles	Jack Huczek; United States	Rocky Carson; United States	Vincent Gagnon; Canada
Women's singles	Paola Longoria; Mexico	Rhonda Rajsich; United States	Angela Grisar; Chile

== Rhythmic gymnastics ==
Event	Gold	Silver	Bronze
Women's rope	Evgeniya Kanaeva; Russia	Anna Bessonova; Ukraine	Olga Kapranova; Russia
Women's hoop	Evgeniya Kanaeva; Russia	Olga Kapranova; Russia	Silvia Miteva; Bulgaria
Women's ball	Evgeniya Kanaeva; Russia	Anna Bessonova; Ukraine	Melitina Staniouta; Belarus
Women's ribbon	Evgeniya Kanaeva; Russia	Anna Bessonova; Ukraine	Aliya Garayeva; Azerbaijan

== Rugby sevens ==
Event	Gold	Silver	Bronze
Men	Fiji; Seremaia Burotu; Suliasi Ramasima; Sean Morrell; Watisoni Votu; Nasoni Roko; Emosi Vucago; Jiuta Lutumailagi; Pio Tuwai; Apisai Naiyabo; Taniela Rawaqa; Orisi Sareki; Peni Rokodiva	Portugal; Sebastião Cunha; Diogo Mateus; Bernardo Silveira; Pedro Leal; Pedro Silva; Gonçalo Foro; Veltioven Tavares; Frederico Oliveira; Francisco Serra; Ricardo Dias; Hugo Valente; Manuel Costa	South Africa; Mpho Mbiyozo; Chase Minnaar; Frankie Horne; Cecil Afrika; Neil Powell; Kyle Brown; Renfred Dazel; Rayno Benjamin; Philip Snyman; Mzwandile Stick; Marnus Schoeman; Gio Aplon

== Sport climbing ==
Event	Gold	Silver	Bronze
Men's lead	Sachi Amma; Japan	Patxi Usobiaga; Spain	Romain Desgranges; France
Men's speed	Zhong Qixin; China	Evgeny Vaytsekhovsky; Russia	Maksym Styenkoviy; Ukraine
Women's lead	Maja Vidmar; Slovenia	Kim Ja-in; South Korea	Caroline Ciavaldini; France
Women's speed	He Cuilian; China	He Cuifang; China	Olga Morozkina; Russia

== Squash ==
Event	Gold	Silver	Bronze
Men's singles	Nick Matthew; Great Britain	James Willstrop; Great Britain	Mohd Azlan Iskandar; Malaysia
Women's singles	Nicol David; Malaysia	Natalie Grinham; Netherlands	Omneya Abdel Kawy; Egypt

== Sumo ==
Event	Gold	Silver	Bronze
Men's 85 kg	Nachyn Mongush; Russia	Rentsendorjiin Gantögs; Mongolia	El-Sayed Gabr; Egypt
Men's 115 kg	Ryo Ito; Japan	Katsuo Yoshida; Japan	Kostiantyn Iermakov; Ukraine
Men's +115 kg	Takashi Himeno; Japan	Gankhuyagiin Naranbat; Mongolia	Alan Karaev; Russia
Men's openweight	Ulambayaryn Byambajav; Mongolia	Mutoshi Matsunaga; Japan	Takashi Himeno; Japan
Women's 65 kg	Alina Boykova; Ukraine	Selengiin Enkhzayaa; Mongolia	Nelli Vorobyeva; Russia
Women's 80 kg	Epp Mäe; Estonia	Maryna Pryshchepa; Ukraine	Asano Matsuura; Japan
Women's +80 kg	Anna Zhigalova; Russia	Olga Davydko; Ukraine	Ekaterina Keyb; Russia
Women's openweight	Anna Zhigalova; Russia	Olga Davydko; Ukraine	Edyta Witkowska; Poland

== Trampoline gymnastics ==
Event	Gold	Silver	Bronze
Men's synchro	Japan; Masaki Ito; Shunsuke Nagasaki	France; Sébastien Martiny; Grégoire Pennes	Germany; Martin Gromowski; Dennis Luxon
Men's double mini	Kirill Ivanov; Russia	André Lico; Portugal	Nico Gärtner; Germany
Men's tumbling	Andrey Krylov; Russia	Mike Barnes; Great Britain	Viktor Kyforenko; Ukraine
Women's synchro	Ukraine; Yulia Domchevska; Olena Movchan	China; Gu Qingwen; Jiang Yiqi	Germany; Carina Baumgärtner; Jessica Simon
Women's double mini	Victoria Voronina; Russia	Sarah Prosen; United States	Aubree Balkan; United States
Women's tumbling	Anna Korobeynikova; Russia	Anzhelika Soldatkina; Russia	Emily Smith; Canada

== Tug of war ==
Event	Gold	Silver	Bronze
Men's outdoor 640 kg	Switzerland; Daniel Brändle; Hans Brändle; Peter Christen; Marco Halter; Patrick Kaufmann; Fabian Langenstein; Josef Räbsamen; Ulrich Vonmoos	Germany; Andreas Berl; Thorsten Berl; Markus Böhler; Matthias Boschert; Dietmar Broghammer; Tim Grundmann; Jürgen Hilkert; Dirk Wagner	Netherlands; Bennie Baak; Ivo Brugman; Edwin Goorhorst; Gerolph Hoff; Teun Huirne; Erwin Leusink; Peter Naalden; Arnold te Bogt
Men's outdoor 680 kg	Netherlands; Ivo Brugman; Wim Eggenkamp; Edwin Goorhorst; Gerolph Hoff; Gerben Jansen; Erwin Leusink; Peter Naalden; Louis Ribberink	Switzerland; Ralph Debelak; Markus Fischer; Johann Henggeler; Daniel Jung; Roland Peter; David Schnellmann; Ruedi Schwendener; Jakob Wechsler	Great Britain; David Bowyer; John Etches; Robert Johnson; Jonathan Jones; Paul Lamb; Steven Morten; David Murphy; Richard Pearson
Women's indoor 520 kg	Chinese Taipei; Chen Li-hui; Cheng Shu-fang; Hsu Yu-ling; Kanlin Yi-ching; Ko Chia-wen; Lee Tzu-yi; Wang Chia-chi; Wang Tzu-jung; Yang Shih-yu	Netherlands; Grietje Annema; Geri Boogaard; Simona de Vries; Paula Delfgaauw; Maaike Hornstra; Aaltje Nieuwland; Nanda Oude Egberink; Johanna van der Meijden; Catharina Weijers	Great Britain; Diana Alcock; Julie Alcock; Louise Bond; Lucinda Charles; Rachel Craft; Heather Nelson; Elaine Smith; Tracey Townsend; Dawn Wainwright

== Water skiing ==
Event	Gold	Silver	Bronze
Men's ski overall	Rodrigo Miranda; Chile	Storm Selsor; United States	Martin Bartalský; Slovakia
Men's barefoot overall	Keith St. Onge; United States	Heinrich Sam; South Africa	David Small; Great Britain
Men's wakeboarding	Andrew Adkison; United States	Kyle Rattray; Canada	Padiwat Jaemjan; Thailand
Women's ski overall	Kate Adriaensen; Belgium	Manon Costard; France	Caroline Hensley; United States
Women's barefoot overall	Elaine Heller; United States	Ashleigh Stebbeings; Australia	Shannon Heller; United States
Women's wakeboarding	Dallas Friday; United States	Raimi Merritt; United States	Miku Asai; Japan

== Invitational sports ==
=== Beach handball ===
Event	Gold	Silver	Bronze
Men	Brazil; Nailson Amaral; Gil Pires; Bruno Oliveira; Antônio Djhandro; Jefte Saraiva; Ânderson Lima; Daniel Baldacin; Wellington Esteves; Cyrillo Avelino; Jarison Pereira	Hungary; Balázs Babicz; Donát Warvasovszky; Zoltán Himer; András John; Péter Kovács; László Kovácsovics; Norbert Musits; Péter Szabó; Ervin Tuba Kovács; Ferenc Császár	Croatia; Luka Bumbak; Josip Šandrk; Ivan Jurić; Hrvoje Horvat; Mladen Paradžik; Krešimir Malbašić; Drago Vojnović; Davor Rokavec; Ninoslav Pavelić
Women	Italy; Carolina Balsanti; Elena Barani; Lorena Bassi; Gyongyi Demeny; Carmen Onnis; Sandra Federspieler; Florentina Pastor; Sabrina Porini; Silvia Scamperle	Croatia; Dubravka Bukovina; Marina Bazzeo; Josipa Grebenar; Snježana Botica; Melita Jug; Ivana Lovrić; Vlatka Šamarinec; Jelena Vidović; Anja Daskijević	Brazil; Cinthya Piquet; Camila Souza; Darlene Silva; Tatianne Yumi Nabissima; Emanuelle Moreira; Priscilla Annes; Gilka Batista; Jerusa Dias; Raila Brandão; Millena Alencar

=== Dragon boat ===
Event	Gold	Silver	Bronze
Mixed 200 m	Russia; Dmitry Adaev; Anton Agaponov; Tatiana Andreeva; Ilya Eremin; Daria Eremina; Andrey Gasan; Sergey Khudoba; Viktor Kiselev; Vyacheslav Kononov; Olga Kostenko; Alexander Kovalenko; Ignat Kovalev; Alena Lebedeva; Irina Melantieva; Vitaly Mikhailovskiy; Alexander Mileev; Alexey Mironov; Natalia Novik; Nikolay Outkin; Viktor Petrov; Dmitry Petrov; Nadezhda Petrova; Alexey Popov; Andrey Reshetov; Ivan Reviakin; Galina Savenko; Olga Semenova; Dmitry Sergeev; Oleg Shelegov; Galina Shelegova; Irina Sidorenko; Alexander Sushtchenko; Sergey Tchemerov; Alexey Terekhov; Stanislav Tilsh; Yury Treushnikov; Alexei Volkonski; Igor Zarubin	Hungary; Gábor Balázs; Péter Balázs; Andrea Barócsi; Attila Bencsik; Attila Bozsik; Edvin Csabai; László Csáky; Adrienn Csengeri; Vivien Folláth; Erzsébet Foltánné Jenei; Gábor Horváth; Attila Györe; Csaba Hüttner; Nóra Kövér; György Kozmann; Mihály Krausz; Márton Metka; Melinda Patyi; Gitta Reményi; Pál Sarudi; Márton Tóth; Edina Ulveczki; Krisztina Wohner	Chinese Taipei; Chang Chia-jen; Chang Chu-han; Chen Chia-yi; Chen Chin-chieh; Chen Hsiu-shih; Chen Wei-han; Chen Wei-ren; Chia Chun-han; Chiu Huai-chun; Chiu Ping-jui; Hsieh Tsu-yao; Hsieh Yen-hsi; Hsieh Yi-lung; Huang Yi-wen; Hung Chia-yi; Hung Wei; Lee Jung-wen; Kuo Chung-hsing; Lai Feng-chang; Lee Han-cheng; Lee Jung-wen; Liu Wei-chen; Ma Chien-ming; Tu Yu-fan; Wang Zih-an; Wu Shih-liang; Yeh Szu-hao; Yin Wan-ting
Mixed 500 m	Russia; Dmitry Adaev; Anton Agaponov; Tatiana Andreeva; Ilya Eremin; Daria Eremina; Andrey Gasan; Sergey Khudoba; Viktor Kiselev; Vyacheslav Kononov; Olga Kostenko; Alexander Kovalenko; Ignat Kovalev; Alena Lebedeva; Irina Melantieva; Vitaly Mikhailovskiy; Alexander Mileev; Alexey Mironov; Natalia Novik; Nikolay Outkin; Viktor Petrov; Dmitry Petrov; Nadezhda Petrova; Alexey Popov; Andrey Reshetov; Ivan Reviakin; Galina Savenko; Olga Semenova; Dmitry Sergeev; Oleg Shelegov; Galina Shelegova; Irina Sidorenko; Alexander Sushtchenko; Sergey Tchemerov; Alexey Terekhov; Stanislav Tilsh; Yury Treushnikov; Alexei Volkonski; Igor Zarubin	Hungary; Gábor Balázs; Péter Balázs; Andrea Barócsi; Attila Bencsik; Attila Bozsik; Edvin Csabai; László Csáky; Adrienn Csengeri; Vivien Folláth; Erzsébet Foltánné Jenei; Gábor Horváth; Attila Györe; Csaba Hüttner; Nóra Kövér; György Kozmann; Mihály Krausz; Márton Metka; Melinda Patyi; Gitta Reményi; Pál Sarudi; Márton Tóth; Edina Ulveczki; Krisztina Wohner	Germany; Nancy Adler; Martin Alt; Arne Bergholz; Stephan Breuing; Rene Dittmann; Anja Fock; Jörg Gentner; Christian Hauke; Nico Hönicke; Grit Kaletta; Uta Kaun; Christof Klimek; Barbara Koch; Tim Korschewsky; Udo Krämer; Eckhard Leue; Friederike Leue; Romy Leue; Wolfgang Mayr; Susann Müller; Jaqueline Ruster; Cornelia Schmidt; Stefan Scholz; Marina Schuck; Tom Siebeneicher; Björn Steigerwald; Philipp Walther
Mixed 1000 m	Russia; Dmitry Adaev; Anton Agaponov; Tatiana Andreeva; Ilya Eremin; Daria Eremina; Andrey Gasan; Sergey Khudoba; Viktor Kiselev; Vyacheslav Kononov; Olga Kostenko; Alexander Kovalenko; Ignat Kovalev; Alena Lebedeva; Irina Melantieva; Vitaly Mikhailovskiy; Alexander Mileev; Alexey Mironov; Natalia Novik; Nikolay Outkin; Viktor Petrov; Dmitry Petrov; Nadezhda Petrova; Alexey Popov; Andrey Reshetov; Ivan Reviakin; Galina Savenko; Olga Semenova; Dmitry Sergeev; Oleg Shelegov; Galina Shelegova; Irina Sidorenko; Alexander Sushtchenko; Sergey Tchemerov; Alexey Terekhov; Stanislav Tilsh; Yury Treushnikov; Alexei Volkonski; Igor Zarubin	Germany; Nancy Adler; Martin Alt; Arne Bergholz; Stephan Breuing; Rene Dittmann; Anja Fock; Jörg Gentner; Christian Hauke; Nico Hönicke; Grit Kaletta; Uta Kaun; Christof Klimek; Barbara Koch; Tim Korschewsky; Udo Krämer; Eckhard Leue; Friederike Leue; Romy Leue; Wolfgang Mayr; Susann Müller; Jaqueline Ruster; Cornelia Schmidt; Stefan Scholz; Marina Schuck; Tom Siebeneicher; Björn Steigerwald; Philipp Walther	Hungary; Gábor Balázs; Péter Balázs; Andrea Barócsi; Attila Bencsik; Attila Bozsik; Edvin Csabai; László Csáky; Adrienn Csengeri; Vivien Folláth; Erzsébet Foltánné Jenei; Gábor Horváth; Attila Györe; Csaba Hüttner; Nóra Kövér; György Kozmann; Mihály Krausz; Márton Metka; Melinda Patyi; Gitta Reményi; Pál Sarudi; Márton Tóth; Edina Ulveczki; Krisztina Wohner
Mixed 2000 m	Russia; Dmitry Adaev; Anton Agaponov; Tatiana Andreeva; Ilya Eremin; Daria Eremina; Andrey Gasan; Sergey Khudoba; Viktor Kiselev; Vyacheslav Kononov; Olga Kostenko; Alexander Kovalenko; Ignat Kovalev; Alena Lebedeva; Irina Melantieva; Vitaly Mikhailovskiy; Alexander Mileev; Alexey Mironov; Natalia Novik; Nikolay Outkin; Viktor Petrov; Dmitry Petrov; Nadezhda Petrova; Alexey Popov; Andrey Reshetov; Ivan Reviakin; Galina Savenko; Olga Semenova; Dmitry Sergeev; Oleg Shelegov; Galina Shelegova; Irina Sidorenko; Alexander Sushtchenko; Sergey Tchemerov; Alexey Terekhov; Stanislav Tilsh; Yury Treushnikov; Alexei Volkonski; Igor Zarubin	Chinese Taipei; Chang Chia-jen; Chang Chu-han; Chen Chia-yi; Chen Chin-chieh; Chen Hsiu-shih; Chen Wei-han; Chen Wei-ren; Chia Chun-han; Chiu Huai-chun; Chiu Ping-jui; Hsieh Tsu-yao; Hsieh Yen-hsi; Hsieh Yi-lung; Huang Yi-wen; Hung Chia-yi; Hung Wei; Lee Jung-wen; Kuo Chung-hsing; Lai Feng-chang; Lee Han-cheng; Lee Jung-wen; Liu Wei-chen; Ma Chien-ming; Tu Yu-fan; Wang Zih-an; Wu Shih-liang; Yeh Szu-hao; Yin Wan-ting	Canada; David Anderson; Harold Curry; Marilyn Dobbs; Raymond Ellis; Kathleen Harrison; Richard Hutton; Keith James; Kevin Lohrenz; Peter Lohrenz; Sabrina McGee; Nicholas Mysko; Cheryl Ramsey; Gordon Ramsey; Barbara Ritchie; Kelly Ritchie; Adrian Schimnowski; Chris Schimnowski; Martin Simmons; Jo-Ann Stebbing; Rosita Thiele; Linda Louise Thomson; Jennifer Treacy; Micheal Treacy; Deborah Woodbeck; Norman Woodbeck

=== Softball ===
Event	Gold	Silver	Bronze
Women	Japan; Yuko Chonan; Satomi Hamauzu; Megumi Inoue; Nana Ishida; Mai Kasuhari; Sayaka Mori; Ryo Morita; Yuri Nishikawa; Rie Nishioka; Erika Omura; Kaori Okada; Kaoru Oyanagi; Erika Shigefuji; Nana Tanabe; Shiho Taniike	Chinese Taipei; Chang Man-hsuan; Chang Li-chiu; Chiang Hui-chuan; Chiu An-ju; Chueh Ming-hui; Chung Hui-lin; Kao Ching-yi; Lai Meng-ting; Lee Hsiao-chi; Li Szu-shih; Li Chiu-ching; Lin Pei-chun; Lo Yin-sha; Wu Hsin-ying; Yang Yi-ting	South Korea; Choi Mi-jin; Hong Ki-ja; Jeong Yoon-young; Jung Young-mi; Kang Hee-young; Kim Min-young; Kim Jin-a; Lee Eun-mi; Lee Bok-hee; Lim Mi-ran; Noh Keum-ran; Pak Sun-yeo; Park Su-youn; Suk Eun-jung; Yoon Hye-young

=== Tchoukball ===
Event	Gold	Silver	Bronze
Men	Chinese Taipei; Lin Wen-pin; Chang Wei-chun; Chang Wei-hsiang; Lee Chih-wei; Chen Yen-chun; Lee Kun-cheng; Lee Shih-jen; Fang Shen-szu; Yao Fei-long; Lee Chen-ming	Switzerland; Pierre-Yves Piguet; Michael Rabotot; Laurent Ludi; Jean-Loup Remolif; Romain Schmocker; Bruno Remolif; Thibaut Collioud; Lionel Cendre; Nathanaël Khodl; Alexandre Dubois	Singapore; Liao Jian Xiong; Chia Jue Cun; Tan Zheng Cao; Geh Si Yuan; Ian Lim; Marck Anthonny Yow; Bruce Tan; Chow Seng Chin; Khairi Abdul Rashid; Lin Sun Tang
Women	Chinese Taipei; Sung Tsai-yun; Chung Hui-chun; Chung Pei-ju; Chung Meng-cheng; Chang Shiu-chi; Lin Shi-yun; Wu Pei-ying; Chung Chia-jung; Cheng Yu-hua; Huang Chien-tzu	Switzerland; Amélie Sautebin; Vanessa Rechik; Garance Gutknecht; Fanny Betrix; Mélanie Jaquet; Camille Schwab; Irina Dinbergs; Samantha Urbina; Déborah Noirjean; Evelaine Paulméry	Canada; Mélanie Beauvais; Priscille Giroux; Marie-Ève Valiquette; Julie Drapeau; Jessica Le; Virginie St-Sauveur; Marianne Melanson; Marilyn Robichaud

=== Wushu ===
Event	Gold	Silver	Bronze
Men's changquan	Yuan Xiaochao; China	Daisuke Ichikizaki; Japan	Semen Udelov; Russia
Men's nanquan & nangun	Peng Wei-chua; Chinese Taipei	Farshad Arabi; Iran	Ho Mun Hua; Malaysia
Men's taijiquan & taijijian	Wu Yanan; China	Hei Zhihong; Hong Kong	Lee Yang; Malaysia
Men's daoshu & gunshu	Zhao Qingjian; China	Cheng Chung Hang; Hong Kong	Trần Đức Trọng; Vietnam
Men's sanda 56 kg	Duan Hansong; China	Sait Khayrulaev; Russia	None awarded
Men's sanda 70 kg	Murad Akhadov; Russia	Chou Ting-yuan; Chinese Taipei	Kim Deuk-su; South Korea
Men's sanda 85 kg	Hamid Reza Gholipour; Iran	Muslim Salikhov; Russia	None awarded
Women's changquan	Daria Tarasova; Russia	Vũ Trà My; Vietnam	Susyana Tjhan; Indonesia
Women's nanquan & nandao	Lin Fan; China	Erika Kojima; Japan	Yuen Ka Ying; Hong Kong
Women's taijiquan & taijijian	Cui Wenjuan; China	Fan Man-yun; Chinese Taipei	Ai Miyaoka; Japan
Women's jianshu & qiangshu	Ma Lingjuan; China	Chen Shao-chi; Chinese Taipei	Nguyễn Mai Phương; Vietnam
Women's sanda 52 kg	E Meidie; China	Nguyễn Thùy Ngân; Vietnam	Maryam Tavakkoli; Iran
Women's sanda 60 kg	Zahra Karimi; Iran	Mariane Mariano; Philippines	Kao Yu-chuan; Chinese Taipei
