= Orienteering at the 2009 World Games – Women's middle distance =

Orienteering women's middle distance at the 2009 World Games
- Venue: Chengcing Lake
- Location: Kaohsiung, Taiwan
- Date: 18 July 2009
- Competitors: 36 from 19 nations

Medalists
gold medal	(Australia) Johanna Allston
silver medal	(Finland) Minna Kauppi
bronze medal	(Sweden) Linnea Gustafsson

The women's sprint competition in orienteering at the 2009 World Games took place on 18 July 2009 at the Chengcing Lake in Kaohsiung, Taiwan.

== Competition format ==
A total of 36 athletes entered the competition. Every athlete had to check in at control points, which were located across the course.

== Results ==
Rank	Athlete	Nation	Time
1st place, gold medalist(s)	Johanna Allston	Australia	27:01.0
2nd place, silver medalist(s)	Minna Kauppi	Finland	28:17.4
3rd place, bronze medalist(s)	Linnea Gustafsson	Sweden	28:44.4
4	Signe Søes	Denmark	28:49.2
5	Aija Skrastina	Latvia	29:16.5
6	Dana Brožková	Czech Republic	29:18.0
7	Elise Egseth	Norway	29:28.4
8	Galina Vinogradova	Russia	29:31.2
9	Sarah Rollins	Great Britain	30:00.9
10	Maja Alm	Denmark	30:06.6
11	Kajsa Nilsson	Sweden	30:07.4
12	Bodil Holmström	Finland	30:12.3
13	Angela Wild	Switzerland	30:30.7
14	Yulia Novikova	Russia	30:40.2
15	Iveta Duchová	Czech Republic	31:22.2
16	Inga Dambe	Latvia	31:25.7
17	Helen Bridle	Great Britain	31:38.5
18	Rahel Friederich	Switzerland	31:56.6
19	Kathryn Ewels	Australia	32:08.4
20	Inga Kazlauskaitė	Lithuania	32:09.4
21	Elizabeth Ingham	New Zealand	32:19.8
22	Tania Larsen	New Zealand	32:21.6
23	Mari Fasting	Norway	33:52.0
24	Radka Brožková	Czech Republic	34:14.2
25	Sandra Paužaitė	Lithuania	34:38.2
26	Katarína Labašová	Slovakia	34:40.0
27	Charlotte Bouchet	France	35:14.1
28	Jana Macinská	Slovakia	35:23.3
29	Sie Wan-jyun	Chinese Taipei	37:21.5
30	Chen Chieh	Chinese Taipei	37:25.1
31	Tania Wimberley	South Africa	38:30.2
32	Mikiko Minagawa	Japan	40:55.1
33	Sarah Brandreth	Canada	53:26.9
	Karine D'Harreville	France	DNS
	Yoko Bamba	Japan	DSQ
	Merike Vanjuk	Estonia	DSQ
