= Orienteering at the 2009 World Games =

- Venue: Chengcing Lake (middle distance, relay); Kaohsiung Museum of Fine Arts (sprint)
- Dates: 17–19 July 2009
- Competitors: 72 from 19 nations

The orienteering events at the 2009 World Games in Kaohsiung was played between 17 and 19 July. 72 orienteers, from 19 nations, participated in the tournament. The orienteering competition took place at Chengcing Lake and in Kaohsiung Museum of Fine Arts.

== Participating nations ==
- Australia (4)
- Canada (2)
- Chinese Taipei (4)
- Czech Republic (5)
- Denmark (4)
- Estonia (1)
- Finland (4)
- France (4)
- Great Britain (4)
- Japan (4)
- Latvia (4)
- Lithuania (4)
- New Zealand (4)
- Norway (4)
- South Africa (2)
- Russia (5)
- Slovakia (4)
- Sweden (4)
- Switzerland (5)

== Medal table ==
Rank	Nation	Gold	Silver	Bronze	Total
1	Russia	2	1	1	4
2	Finland	1	2	1	4
3	Australia	1	1	0	2
3	Switzerland	1	1	0	2
5	Norway	0	0	2	2
6	Sweden	0	0	1	1
Totals (6 entries)		5	5	5	15

== Events ==
Event	Gold	Silver	Bronze
Men's sprint	Andrey Khramov; Russia	Daniel Hubmann; Switzerland	Tero Föhr; Finland
Men's middle distance	Daniel Hubmann; Switzerland	Dmitry Tsvetkov; Russia	Andrey Khramov; Russia
Women's sprint	Minna Kauppi; Finland	Johanna Allston; Australia	Elise Egseth; Norway
Women's middle distance	Johanna Allston; Australia	Minna Kauppi; Finland	Linnea Gustafsson; Sweden
Mixed relay	Russia; Dmitry Tsvetkov; Yulia Novikova; Andrey Khramov; Galina Vinogradova	Finland; Pasi Ikonen; Bodil Holmström; Tero Föhr; Minna Kauppi	Norway; Lars Skjeset; Mari Fasting; Øystein Kvaal Østerbø; Elise Egseth
