= Orienteering at the 2009 World Games – Women's sprint =

Orienteering women's sprint at the 2009 World Games
- Venue: Kaohsiung Museum of Fine Arts
- Location: Kaohsiung, Taiwan
- Date: 17 July 2009
- Competitors: 36 from 19 nations

Medalists
gold medal	(Finland) Minna Kauppi
silver medal	(Australia) Johanna Allston
bronze medal	(Norway) Elise Egseth

The women's sprint competition in orienteering at the 2009 World Games took place on 17 July 2009 at the Kaohsiung Museum of Fine Arts in Kaohsiung, Taiwan.

== Competition format ==
A total of 36 athletes entered the competition. Every athlete had to check in at control points, which were located across the course.

== Results ==
Rank	Athlete	Nation	Time
1st place, gold medalist(s)	Minna Kauppi	Finland	14:17.7
2nd place, silver medalist(s)	Johanna Allston	Australia	14:40.0
3rd place, bronze medalist(s)	Elise Egseth	Norway	14:53.8
4	Rahel Friederich	Switzerland	15:05.1
5	Linnea Gustafsson	Sweden	15:06.8
6	Sarah Rollins	Great Britain	15:25.4
7	Bodil Holmström	Finland	15:33.0
8	Maja Alm	Denmark	15:45.8
9	Helen Bridle	Great Britain	15:47.9
10	Galina Vinogradova	Russia	15:49.9
11	Angela Wild	Switzerland	15:52.7
12	Yulia Novikova	Russia	16:07.8
13	Signe Søes	Denmark	16:09.3
14	Tania Larsen	New Zealand	16:12.8
15	Kathryn Ewels	Australia	16:14.1
16	Dana Brožková	Czech Republic	16:17.4
17	Iveta Duchová	Czech Republic	16:22.0
18	Kajsa Nilsson	Sweden	16:32.3
19	Mari Fasting	Norway	16:34.1
20	Aija Skrastina	Latvia	16:39.0
21	Inga Dambe	Latvia	16:49.7
22	Elizabeth Ingham	New Zealand	17:04.1
23	Chen Chieh	Chinese Taipei	17:55.6
24	Radka Brožková	Czech Republic	17:58.5
25	Mikiko Minagawa	Japan	18:08.1
26	Sandra Paužaitė	Lithuania	18:13.5
27	Sie Wan-jyun	Chinese Taipei	18:23.3
28	Charlotte Bouchet	France	18:29.6
29	Karine D'Harreville	France	18:39.7
30	Yoko Bamba	Japan	19:38.6
31	Tania Wimberley	South Africa	20:20.0
32	Inga Kazlauskaitė	Lithuania	21:04.8
33	Merike Vanjuk	Estonia	21:19.7
34	Sarah Brandreth	Canada	23:58.8
	Katarína Labašová	Slovakia	DSQ
	Jana Macinská	Slovakia	DSQ
