= Zvěřina =

Zvěřina (feminine Zvěřinová) is a Czech surname. Notable people include:

- František Bohumír Zvěřina, Czech painter
- Jana Zvěřinová, Czech canoeist
- Jaroslav Zvěřina, Czech politician
- Martina Zvěřinová, Czech orienteer
