= Lifesaving at the 2009 World Games =

- Venues: Kaohsiung Swimming Pool (pool); Sizihwan Bay (beach)
- Dates: 23–25 July 2009
- Competitors: 96 from 8 nations

The lifesaving events at the 2009 World Games in Kaohsiung was played between 23 and 25 July. 96 athletes from 8 nations participated in the tournament. The competition took place in Kaohsiung Swimming Pool for pool events and in Sizihwan Bay for beach events. For both men and women, there were four individual events in pool lifesaving, three individual events in beach lifesaving, and an overall team event combining five non-medal team and relay events in pool and beach disciplines.

== Participating nations ==
- Australia (13)
- China (11)
- Chinese Taipei (12)
- France (12)
- Germany (12)
- Italy (12)
- New Zealand (12)
- South Africa (12)

== Medal table ==
| Rank | Nation | Gold | Silver | Bronze | Total |
|---|---|---|---|---|---|
| 1 | Italy | 5 | 2 | 5 | 12 |
| 2 | Australia | 4 | 7 | 2 | 13 |
| 3 | China | 4 | 4 | 3 | 11 |
| 4 | New Zealand | 2 | 2 | 3 | 7 |
| 5 | Germany | 1 | 0 | 1 | 2 |
| 6 | France | 0 | 1 | 0 | 1 |
| 7 | Chinese Taipei | 0 | 0 | 1 | 1 |
| 7 | South Africa | 0 | 0 | 1 | 1 |
| Totals (8 entries) | | 16 | 16 | 16 | 48 |

== Events ==
=== Men ===
| Event | Gold | Silver | Bronze |
|---|---|---|---|
| 50 m manikin carry | Federico Pinotti; Italy | Florian Laclaustra; France | Giovanni Legnani; Italy |
| 100 m manikin carry with fins | Simone Procaccia; Italy | Zhang Jiawen; China | Nicola Ferrua; Italy |
| 100 m rescue medley | Federico Pinotti; Italy | Giovanni Legnani; Italy | Andrew Bowden; Australia |
| 200 m obstacle swim | Zhang Enjian; China | Federico Pinotti; Italy | Benjamin Bilski; Germany |
| Board race | Dan Moodie; New Zealand | Hugh Dougherty; Australia | Shannon Eckstein; Australia |
| Ocean | Shannon Eckstein; Australia | Hugh Dougherty; Australia | Ryan Brennan; South Africa |
| Surf race | Chris Allum; Australia | Glenn Anderson; New Zealand | Federico Pinotti; Italy |
| Team overall (Note: The overall team event combined results in five non-medal team events to determine the final ranking: 4x50m obstacle relay, 4x25m manikin carry, 4x50m medley relay, rescue tube race and board rescue race.) | Italy; Nicola Ferrua; Diego Giuglar; Giovanni Legnani; Federico Pinotti; Simone Procaccia; Germano Proietti | Australia; Chris Allum; Andrew Bowden; Hugh Dougherty; Shannon Eckstein; Luke Harper; Mitchell Parkes | Shared silver |
| Team overall | Italy; Nicola Ferrua; Diego Giuglar; Giovanni Legnani; Federico Pinotti; Simone Procaccia; Germano Proietti | New Zealand; Glenn Anderson; John Gatfield; Mike Janes; Steven Kent; Dan Moodie; Matt Sutton | Shared silver |

=== Women ===
| Event | Gold | Silver | Bronze |
|---|---|---|---|
| 50 m manikin carry | Isabella Cerquozzi; Italy | Gao Yuting; China | He Qian; China |
| 100 m manikin carry with fins | Song Jianrong; China | Huang Jiefen; China | Marcella Prandi; Italy |
| 100 m rescue medley | Gao Yuting; China | Sarah Windsor; Australia | He Qian; China |
| 200 m obstacle swim | Lu Ying; China | Yang Jieqiao; China | Yang Chin-kuei; Chinese Taipei |
| Board race | Nikki Cox; New Zealand | Naomi Flood; Australia | Madison Boon; New Zealand |
| Ocean | Naomi Flood; Australia | Kristyl Smith; Australia | Nikki Cox; New Zealand |
| Surf race | Kristyl Smith; Australia | Naomi Flood; Australia | Ayla Dunlop-Barrett; New Zealand |
| Team overall (Note: The overall team event combined results in five non-medal team events to determine the final ranking: 4x50m obstacle relay, 4x25m manikin carry, 4x50m medley relay, rescue tube race and board rescue race.) | Germany; Katrin Altmann; Fabienne Göller; Aline Hundt; Stephanie Kasperski; Julia Schatz; Stefanie Schoder | Australia; Naomi Flood; Felysia Konakoff; Jennifer Parry; Kristyl Smith; Terri Sullivan; Sarah Windsor | China; Gao Yuting; He Qian; Huang Jiefen; Lu Ying; Song Jianrong; Yang Jieqiao |
| Team overall | Germany; Katrin Altmann; Fabienne Göller; Aline Hundt; Stephanie Kasperski; Julia Schatz; Stefanie Schoder | Australia; Naomi Flood; Felysia Konakoff; Jennifer Parry; Kristyl Smith; Terri Sullivan; Sarah Windsor | Italy; Isabella Cerquozzi; Marta Mozzanica; Chiara Pidello; Marcella Prandi; Elena Prelle |
