= Gatfield =

Gatfield is a surname. Notable people with the surname include:

- Gill Gatfield (born 1963), New Zealand sculptor
- John Gatfield (born 1990), New Zealand swimming coach
- Nick Gatfield (born 1960), British music executive
