= Six Foot Track =

Track in New South Wales, Australia

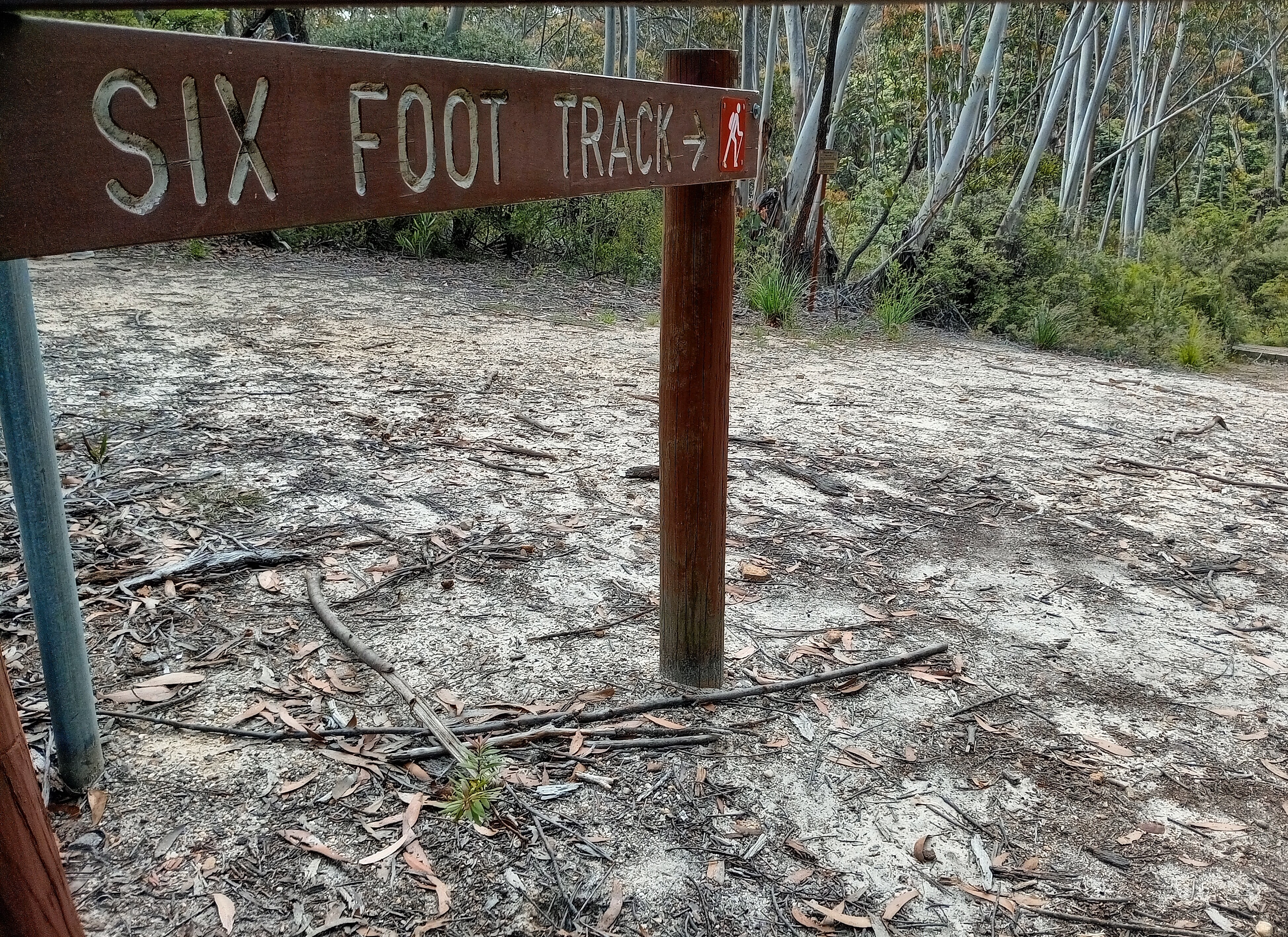
- Direction sign along the Six Foot Track.
- Length: 44.3 km (27.5 mi)
- Location: New South Wales, Australia
- Trailheads: Explorers Tree (Katoomba), Jenolan Caves
- Use: Hiking
- Elevation change: 1,600 m (5,200 ft) approx
- Highest point: Black Range, 1,200 m (3,900 ft) approx
- Lowest point: Coxs River, 400 m (1,300 ft) approx
- Difficulty: Medium
- Season: All
- Sights: Caves, escarpments, wilderness, fauna

The Six Foot Track is a long hiking trail in New South Wales, Australia that stretches from Katoomba to Jenolan Caves. It was originally a bridle trail for horse from Katoomba to the Caves, and is now a walking trail of 44.3 kilometres (27.5 mi). It has a steep descent at first as it traverses Nellie's Glen, and ascends when it reaches Black Range.

== History ==
The Jenolan Caves are a tourist attraction that first became popular in the mid and late nineteenth century. The journey to the caves from Sydney was a long one, though, and even after the western railway was completed to Bathurst in 1870, the journey involved a lengthy horse ride from the nearest station at Tarana.

In 1884 a New South Wales government party marked out a new horse track from Katoomba across the Coxs River to shorten the journey. The track was constructed to be six feet wide (in order that two loaded drays could pass each other at any point), and was completed at a cost of £2500, although it was not until 1937 that the track became known as the Six Foot Track, by which time it was already close to impassable.

The first recorded journey on the track was in 1887 by the NSW Governor, Lord Carrington, and his wife. The journey from start to finish took approximately eight hours and was very popular until motor vehicles gradually took over in the twentieth century, and an alternative route to Jenolan was built.

Although the route was being used as a walking track in the early 1920s, it fell into effective disuse, until reinstated by the Department of Lands of New South Wales in 1984. Today the Six Foot Track is one of Australia's most iconic and well-known overland tracks.

== Track description ==
Starting on the western outskirts of Katoomba at the Explorers tree, the track descends via steep steps through the temperate rainforest of Nellies Glen to the Megalong Valley floor. Here in the valley the track passes the historical site of the abandoned shale mining Megalong Village and continues on through farmland past the Megalong Cemetery (this is just off the track).

The track winds along the steep-sided banks of the Coxs River. The river is crossed either via ford or by using a suspension bridge, called Bowtells Swing Bridge, built by 3 Troop, the 'Tunnel Rats' of the 1st Field Squadron of the Royal Australian Engineers in 1991. It was named in honour of CPL Bob Bowtell a former member of 3 Tp. Bob was born in Katoomba and he died in Vietnam. He was one of the famous 'Tunnel Rats' and he died in a tunnel clearance. His children attended the opening of the bridge in 1992.

A dedicated campsite is available where most people camp the night before the demanding climb up to Mini-Mini Saddle the next morning and then the descent to Alum Creek.

Another challenging uphill climb is then tackled with the rise to the Pluviometer which is situated towards the eastern end of the Black Range ridge. This is followed by a slightly-inclining walk along the ridgeline to the dedicated Black Range Campsite. From here the track crosses then hugs close to Jenolan Road before diverting to the final descent to the limestone caves at Jenolan.

The track is best walked in spring or autumn due to the heat and bushfire hazards of summer and the cold nights and rain of winter. The track can be walked in either direction.

There is a popular running race, the Six Foot Track Marathon, along the length of the trail every March. In 2009, 849 runners started the race at Explorers Tree. This race has become iconic, one of the premier long-distance events in the world and celebrated its 25th anniversary on 8 March 2008.

Relevant topographic maps for the track are available from the NSW Department of Lands, maps Katoomba (8930-1S), Hampton (8930-4S) and Jenolan (8930-3N) cover the entirety of the track. Or Download and print the full map set on the PDF from wildwalks

== Track terrain profile ==
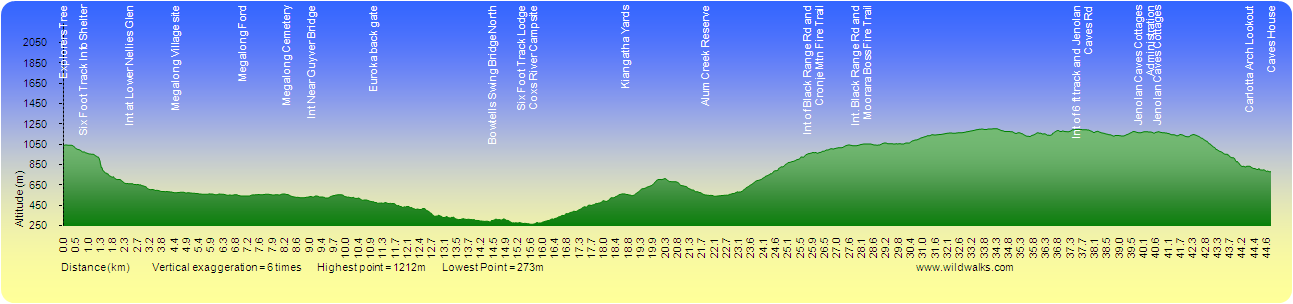
Here is a terrain profile of the walk (via the swing bridge) Starting from the Katoomba End,

== Images ==
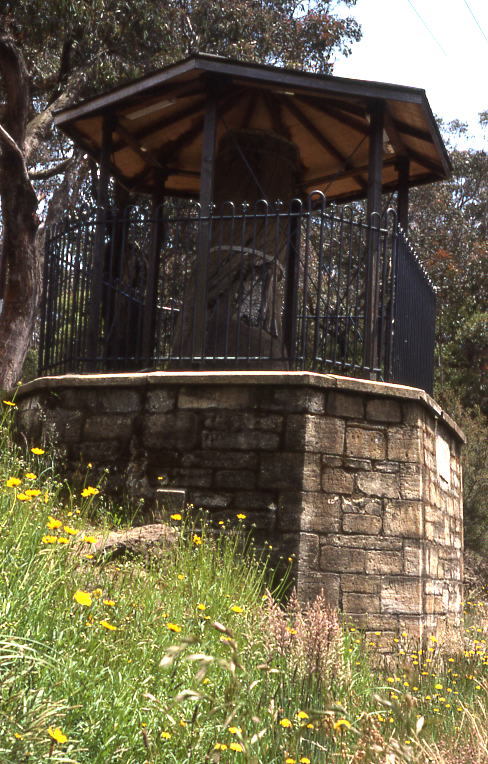
The Explorers Tree, Katoomba

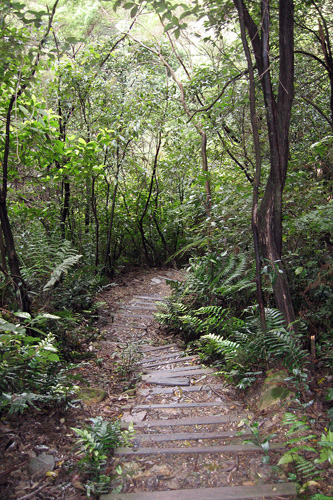
The track at Nellies Glen

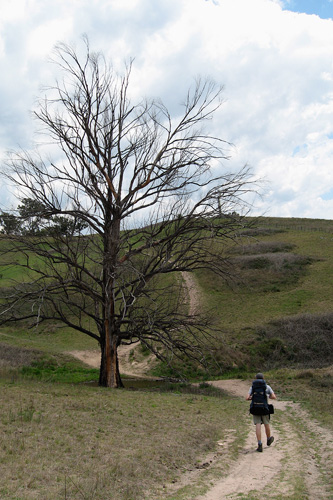
The track where it passes through the Megalong Valley

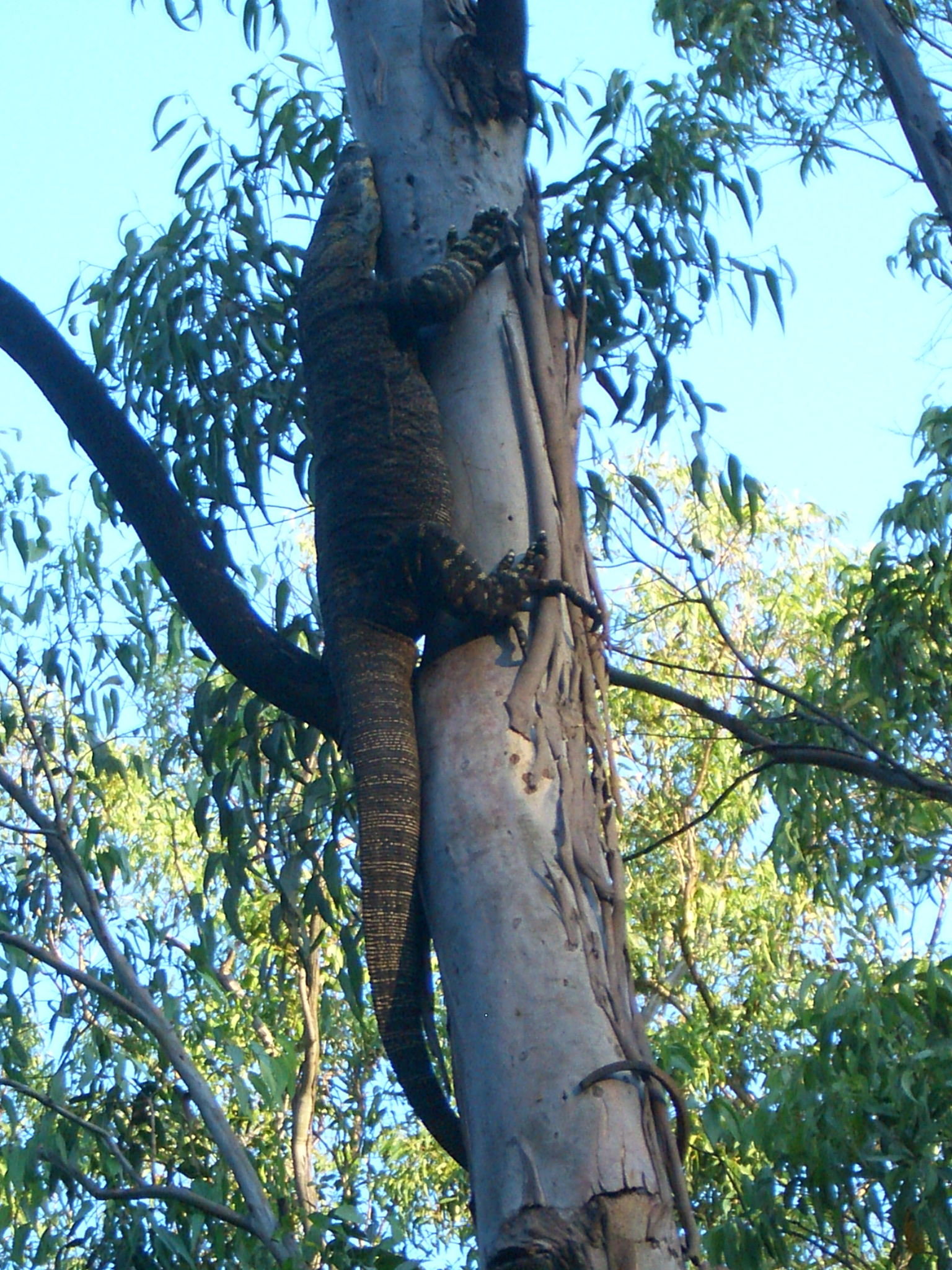
Goanna climbing a tree near Six Foot Track
