= František Bubák =

Czech lichenologist and mycologist (1866–1925)

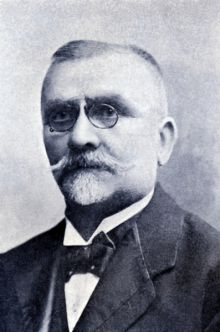
František Bubák

František Bubák (22 July 1866 – 19 September 1925) was a Czech mycologist and phytopathologist.

== Life ==
Bubák was born on 22 July 1866 in Rovensko pod Troskami. From 1902 to 1919, he served as a professor at the provincial academy in Tábor, followed by a professorship in botany and plant pathology at the agricultural university in Brno. From 1920 to 1925, he was a professor at the Czech Technical University in Prague (Faculty of Agriculture and Forestry).

He was the author of numerous papers involving fungi native to Bohemia, Bosnia, Bulgaria, Galicia, Hungary, Istria, Montenegro, Moravia, Russia and Tyrol. He also published works on North American fungi. The mycological genus Bubakia is named in his honor. Together with Josef Emanuel Kabát he published the exsiccata Fungi imperfecti exsiccati.

Bubák died on 19 September 1925 in Prague.

== Selected works ==
- O rezich, které eizopasi na některych Rubiaceich, 1899.
- Einige neue oder kritische Uromyces-Arten, 1903 – On some new or critical Uromyces species.
- Infektionsversuche mit einigen Uredineen. Zentralblatt für Bakteriologie, Parasitenkunde, Infektionskrankheiten und Hygiene Abt. 2 9: 913-[925], 1902 – Infection experiments with some members of Uredineae.
- Mykologische Beiträge, 1904 – Mycological contributions.
- "Fungi Imperfecti Exsiccati" Fasc. 8 : nos 351-400, with Josef Emanuel Kabát (1849–1925).
- Eine neue Krankheit der Maulbeerbäume. 2. Bericht der Deutschen Botanischen Gesellschaft 29: 70-74, 1911 – A new disease affecting mulberry trees.
- Ein neuer Pilz mit sympodialer Konidienbildung. Bericht der Deutschen Botanischen Gesellschaft 29: 381-385, 1911 – A new fungus with sympodial conidia.
