= Diego Giuglar =

Italian lifesaving athlete

Personal information
- Nationality: Italian
- Born: 1983 (age 42–43)

Sport
- Sport: Swimming
- Strokes: Lifesaving
- Club: G.S. Marina Militare
Medal record
World Games
Gold medal – first place	2009 Kaohsiung	Team

Diego Giuglar (born 1983) is an Italian male lifesaving athlete who won a gold medal with the national team at the 2009 World Games.

Giuglar is an athlete of the Gruppo Sportivo della Marina Militare.

== See also ==
- List of 2009 World Games medal winners
