= Six Foot Track Marathon =

The Six Foot Track Marathon is a 45 km annual foot race along the Six Foot Track, a historical trail between Katoomba and the Jenolan Caves and is described as "the toughest marathon in Australia". The ultramarathon was founded in 1984 to mark the centenary of the track, and raises funds for the Rural Fire Service & Six Foot Track Heritage Trust. The women's race record of 3:34:50 is held by Hanny Allston and the men's record of 3:14:14 is held by Stuart Gibson.

It is held in March and runners must be prepared to tackle temperatures of over 30 degrees, river crossings and extreme changes in elevation in addition to the normal challenges of a marathon.

== Track profile ==
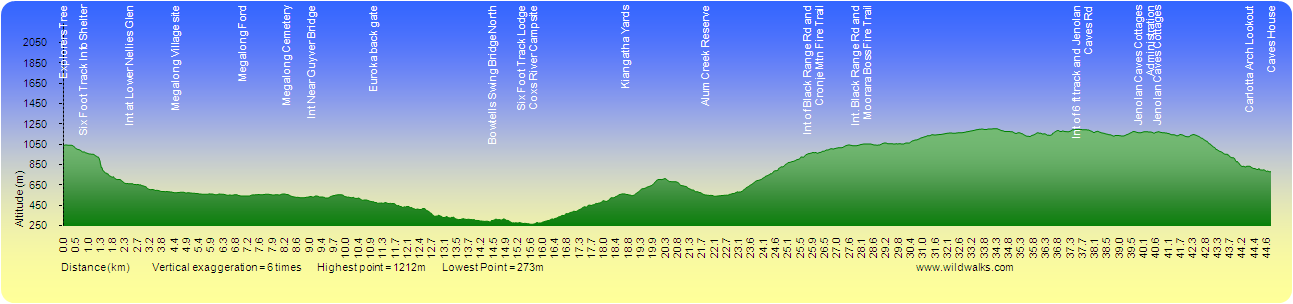
The Six Foot Track descends from Nellies Glen into Megalong Valley before crossing Coxs River and ascending Black Ridge. It continues along the range for ~15 km before sharply descending to Jenolan. It gains 1528m over the course of the race with a maximum elevation of 1200m at Black Range and minimum of 400m at the Coxs River crossing.
