= Martina Zvěřinová =

Czech orienteering competitor

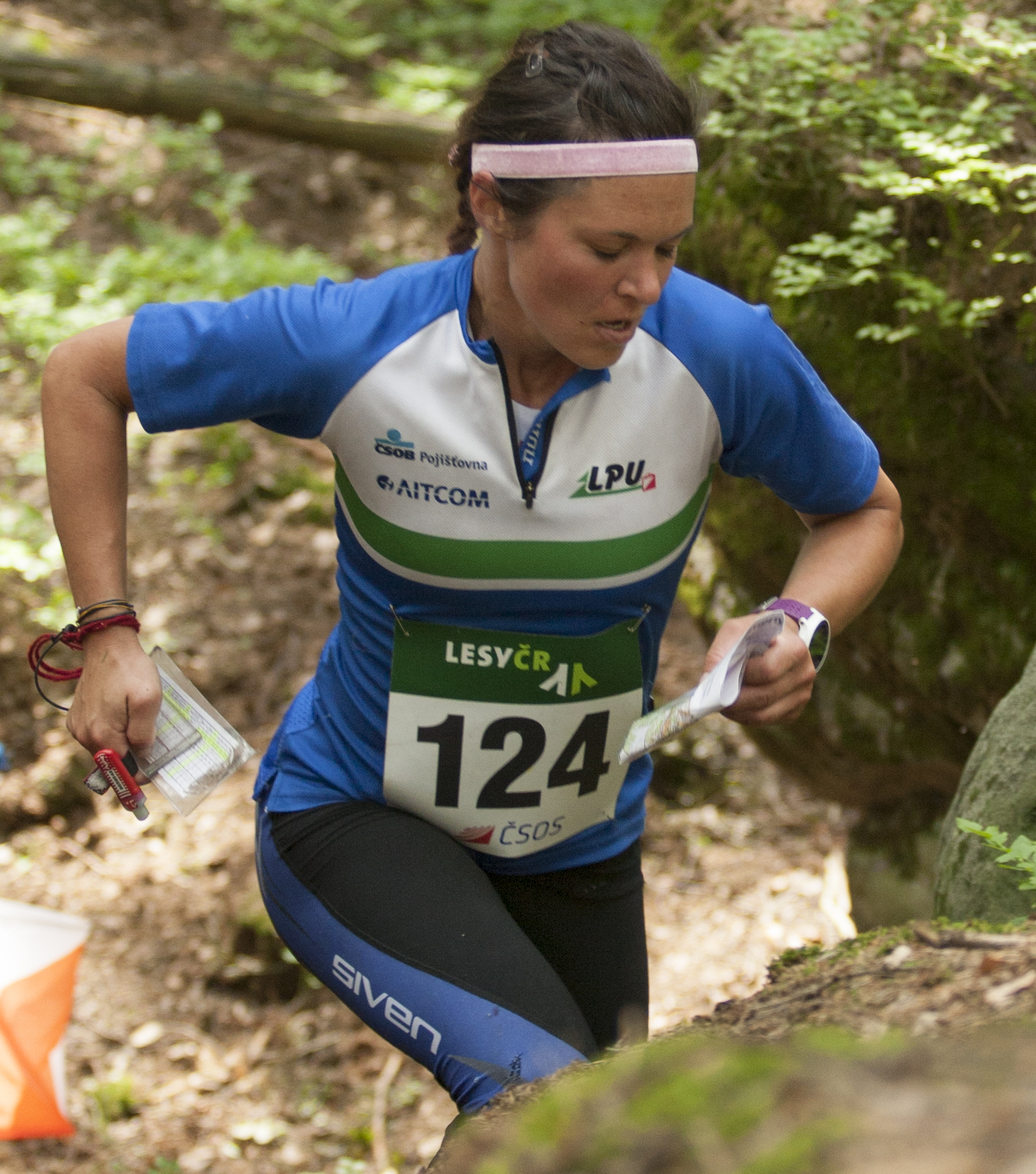
- Zvěřinová in 2019

Personal information
- Nationality: Czech
- Born: Martina Dočkalová; 22 July 1983 (age 42) Pardubice, Czechoslovakia
Medal record
Women's orienteering
Representing Czech Republic
World Championships
Silver medal – second place	2011 Savoie	Relay
Junior World Championships
Gold medal – first place	2003 Põlva	Classic
Silver medal – second place	2001 Miskolc	Relay

Martina Zvěřinová (née Dočkalová, born 22 July 1983) is a Czech orienteering competitor. She won a silver medal with the Czech relay team at the 2011 World Orienteering Championships in Chambéry.

She is Junior World Champion from 2003.
