= Rovensko pod Troskami =

- Town
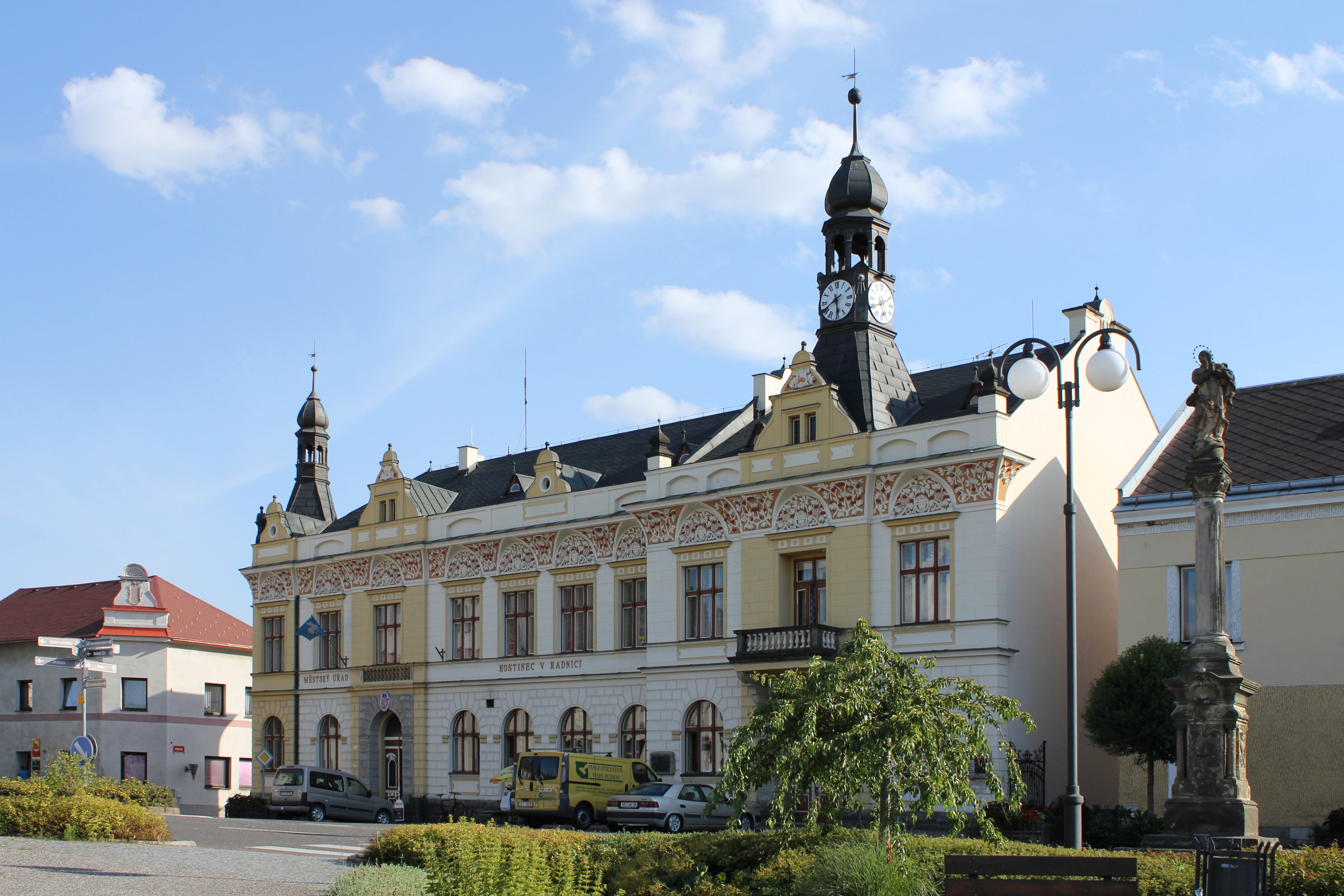
- Town hall

- Flag Coat of arms

- Location in the Czech Republic
- Coordinates: 50°32′7″N 15°15′34″E
- Country: Czech Republic
- Region: Liberec
- District: Semily
- First mentioned: 1371

Government
  - Mayor: Jiřina Bláhová

Area
  - Total: 12.81 km^{2} (4.95 sq mi)
- Elevation: 306 m (1,004 ft)

Population (2026-01-01)
  - Total: 1,369
  - Density: 106.9/km^{2} (276.8/sq mi)
- Time zone: UTC+1 (CET)
  - Summer (DST): UTC+2 (CEST)
- Postal code: 512 63
- Website: www.rovensko.cz

Rovensko pod Troskami (Czech pronunciation: [ˈrovɛnsko ˈpot troskamɪ]) is a town in Semily District in the Liberec Region of the Czech Republic. It has about 1,400 inhabitants.

== Administrative division ==
Rovensko pod Troskami consists of six municipal parts (in brackets population according to the 2021 census):

- Rovensko pod Troskami (1,108)
- Blatec (33)
- Křečovice 2.díl (40)
- Liščí Kotce (21)
- Štěpánovice (47)
- Václaví (45)

== Etymology ==
The suffix -sko in the name Rovensko indicated that settlement was either connected in some way to the nearby village of Roveň, or that it was founded on the site of an abandoned village called Roveň and took its name.

== Geography ==
Rovensko pod Troskami is located about 27 kilometres (17 mi) southeast of Liberec. It lies mostly in the Jičín Uplands, only the eastern part of the municipal territory extends into the Ještěd–Kozákov Ridge. The highest point is the hill Kámen at 440 m (1,444 ft) above sea level. The Veselka Stream flows through the town.

== History ==
The first written mention of Rovensko pod Troskami is from 1371.

== Demographics ==
Historical population

Year	Pop.	±%
1869	2,646	—
1880	2,521	−4.7%
1890	2,669	+5.9%
1900	2,673	+0.1%
1910	2,721	+1.8%

Year	Pop.	±%
1921	2,537	−6.8%
1930	2,285	−9.9%
1950	1,731	−24.2%
1961	1,752	+1.2%
1970	1,460	−16.7%

Year	Pop.	±%
1980	1,334	−8.6%
1991	1,254	−6.0%
2001	1,262	+0.6%
2011	1,263	+0.1%
2021	1,294	+2.5%

Source: Censuses

== Transport ==
Rovensko pod Troskami is located on the railway line Hradec Králové–Turnov.

== Sights ==
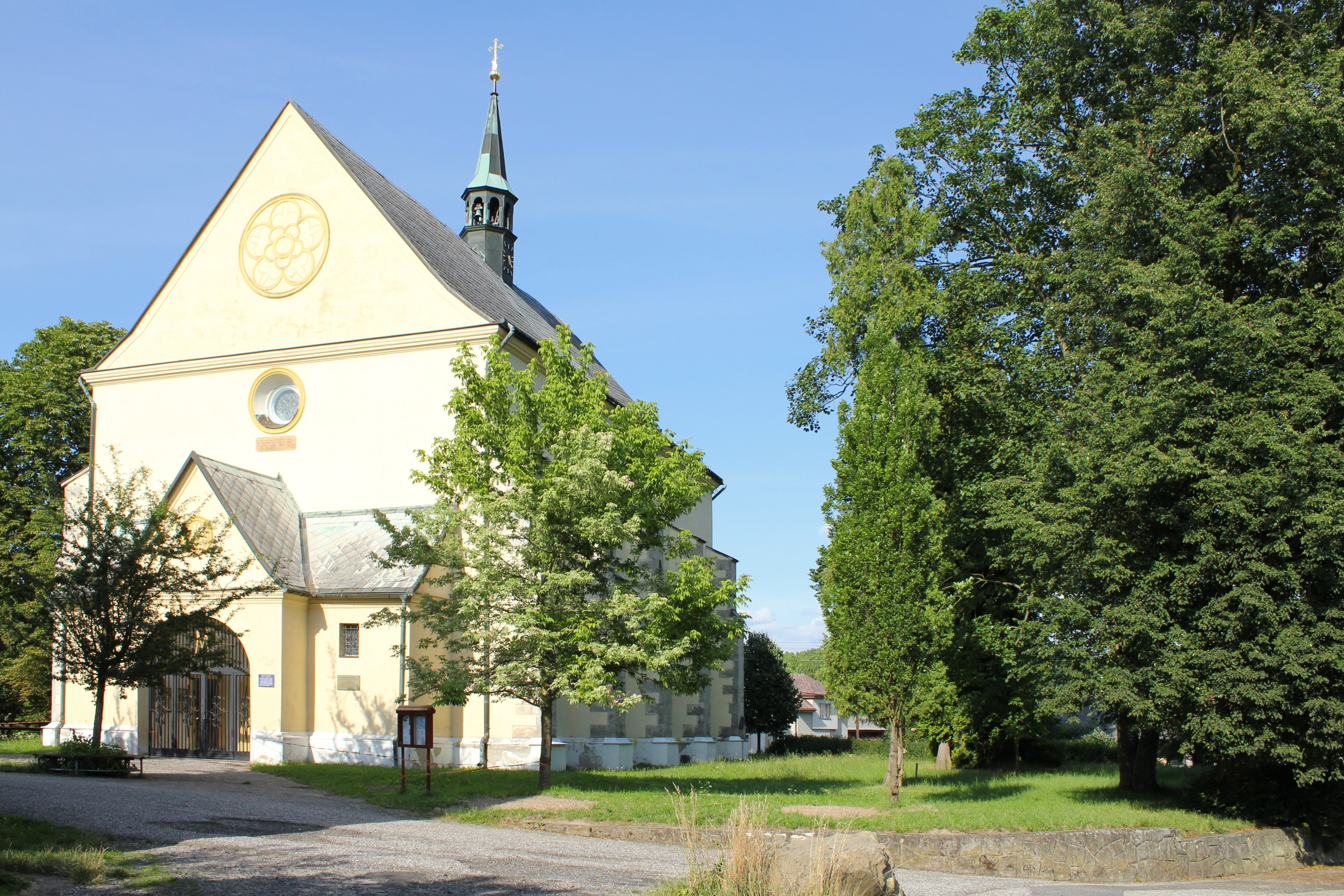
Church of Saint Wenceslaus

The main landmark of the town is the Church of Saint Wenceslaus. The originally Gothic church was rebuilt in the Baroque style in 1724, later it was modified in the neo-Gothic style. Next to the church stands a separate wooden bell tower, which dates from 1630. Its rarity are three early Baroque bells, hung upside down.

== Notable people ==
- Václav Karel Holan Rovenský (1644–1718), composer and organist
- František Bubák (1866–1925), mycologist and phytopathologist
- Dana Brožková (born 1981), orienteer
