= Ninoslav Pavelić =

Croatian handball coach (born 1973)

Personal information
- Nationality: Croatian
- Born: 1 June 1973 (age 53) Zagreb, Croatia, Yugoslavia

Sport
- Sport: Handball
- Current club: Croatia (GK Coach)

Senior clubs
- Years: Team
- –2005: ?
- 2005–2007: HC Horgen
- 2007–2008: RK Nexe Našice
- 2008–2009: Grasshopper Club Zürich
- 2009–2010: HC Kelag Kärnten
- 2010–2011: 1. FC Lokomotive Leipzig
- 2011–2012: HC Kelag Kärnten (Playing coach)
- 2012–2013: Muscat Club (Playing GK coach)
- 2013: HC Horgen (Playing GK coach)

Teams managed
- 2008–: Kadetten Schaffhausen
- 2011–2012: HC Kelag Kärnten (Playing coach)
- 2012–2013: Muscat Club (Playing GK coach)
- 2013: HC Horgen (Playing GK coach)

Ninoslav Pavelić (born 1 June 1973) is a Croatian handball goalkeeping coach, who is currently working as a goalkeeping coach of Croatia men's national handball team.

== Playing career ==
In October 2005 he signed a contract with HC Horgen in Switzerland. He previously played in Italy but has not had a contract lately. Because of budget reasons Horgen cancelled the contract mid season in February 2007. After the termination of contract he played in his home country for RK Nexe Našice. In 2008 he signed with Grasshopper Club Zürich from Switzerland. For the saison 2009–10 he played for HC Kelag Kärnten from Austria. After a season for 1. FC Lokomotive Leipzig he returns as playing coach for Kärnten. With the Muscat Club he played at the 2012 Asian Club League Handball Championship. In January 2013 he came back to HC Horgen and played his last season.

== Coaching career ==
Between 2008 and 2013 he was playing goalkeeper coach for various clubs. After his retirement as goalkeeper. He has been goalkeeper coach for some clubs in Croatia. Most notably he is goalkeeper coach of the Croatia men's national handball team since 2017 and of RK Nexe Našice since 2016.
