= Alexei Volkonski =

Russian canoeist

Medal record

Men's canoe sprint

World Championships
Gold medal – first place	1999 Milan	C-4 1000 m
Bronze medal – third place	2001 Poznań	C-4 500 m

Alexei Volkonski (Russian: Алексей Волконский, born 4 December 1978 in Vladivostok) is a Russian flatwater canoer.

== Biography ==
He is a former world and European champion in the Canadian canoe C4 1000m.

Volkonsky did not take up canoeing until the relatively late age of fifteen, when he was persuaded by friends to switch from judo. In 1999 he won two gold medals at the senior European championships in Zagreb in the C4 500m and C4 1000m. The same year he won the C4 1000m gold medal at the world championships in Milan.

Since then he has been a regular medallist at the major championships, always in the four-man (C4) canoe. At the 2001 World Championships in Poznań he won a 500m bronze medal. In 2002 European Championship in Szeged he won two medals (500m silver and 200m bronze). Two years later he returned to Poznań to win two more European silver medals (200m and 500m).

In 2006 Volkonsky finished fifth in the C4 1000m final at the world championships.

Volkonsky is a student at Tver State University. He is coached by Gennady Shishigin and Sergey Kima.
