= Andrea Barócsi =

Hungarian canoeist

Medal record

Women's canoe sprint

World Championships
Silver medal – second place	1997 Dartmouth	K-4 500 m
Silver medal – second place	1998 Szeged	K-4 500 m
Bronze medal – third place	1999 Milan	K-2 1000 m

Andrea Barosci is a Hungarian sprint canoer who competed in the late 1990s. She won three medals at the ICF Canoe Sprint World Championships with two silvers (K-4 500 m: 1997, 1998) and a bronze (K-2 1000 m: 1999).
