= Alexander Kovalenko (canoeist) =

Russian canoeist

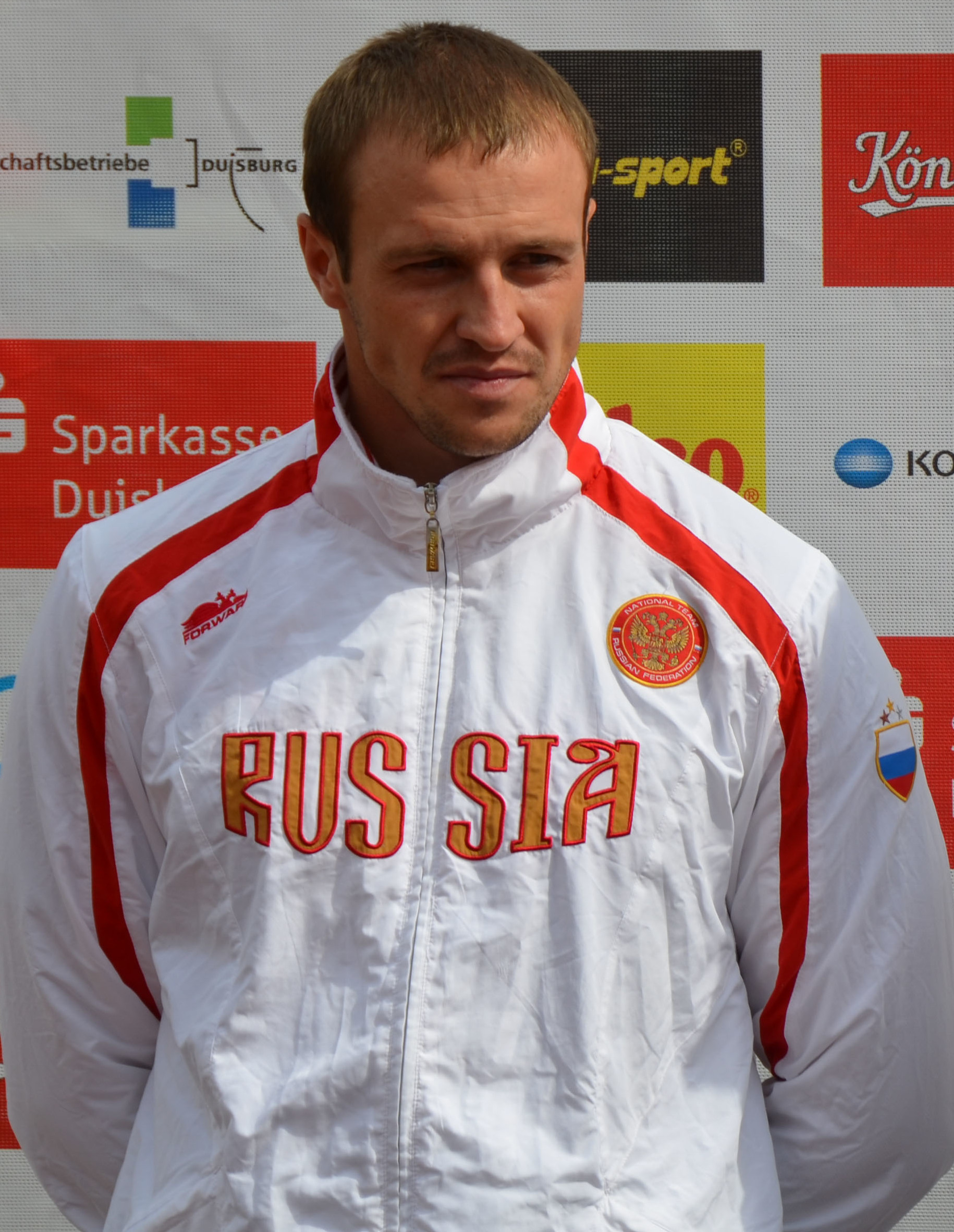

Personal information
- Nationality: Russian
- Born: 1986 (age 39–40)

Sport
- Country: Russia
- Sport: Canoe sprint
- Event: Canoeing
Medal record
World Championships
Gold medal – first place	2017 Račice	C-2 200 m
Bronze medal – third place	2018 Montemor-o-Velho	C-2 200 m

Alexander Kovalenko (born 1986) is a Russian sprint canoeist. He participated at the 2018 ICF Canoe Sprint World Championships.
