= Ignat Kovalev =

Russian canoeist

Medal record

Men's canoe sprint

World Championships
Gold medal – first place	1999 Milan	C-4 1000 m
Silver medal – second place	1998 Szeged	C-4 1000 m

Ignat Kovalev is a Russian sprint canoer who competed in the late 1990s. He won two medals in the C-4 1000 m event at the ICF Canoe Sprint World Championships with a gold in 1999 and a silver in 1998.
