= Márton Tóth =

Hungarian sprint canoer

Medal record

Men's canoe sprint

World Championships
Bronze medal – third place	2010 Poznań	C-2 1000 m

European Championships
Gold medal – first place	2011 Belgrade	C-4 1000 m
Bronze medal – third place	2012 Zagreb	C-4 1000 m

Márton Tóth is a Hungarian sprint canoer who has competed since the late 2000s. He won a bronze medal in the C-2 1000 m event at the 2010 ICF Canoe Sprint World Championships in Poznań.
