= Benjamin Bilski =

German swimmer

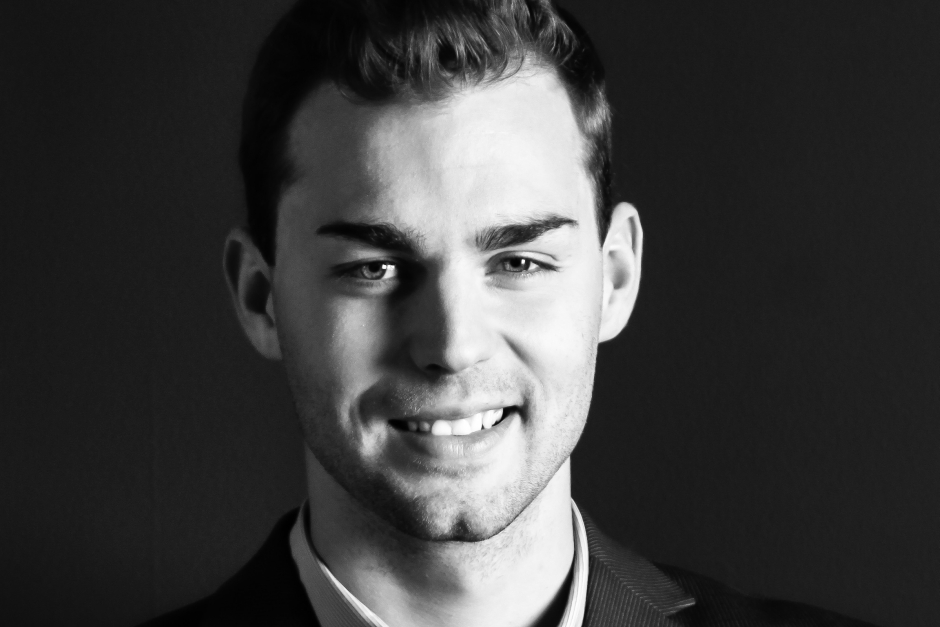
- Bilski in 2016
- Born: August 11, 1988 (age 38); Bad Soden am Taunus, West Germany
- Citizenship: Germany
- Education: Die accadis Hochschule Bad Homburg; EBS University of Business and Law
- Occupations: Swimmer, entrepreneur
- Awards: Bronze medal on World Games (2009)

Medal record

Men's lifesaving

Representing Germany

The World Games
Bronze medal – third place	2009 Kaohsiung	200m Obstacle Swim

Benjamin Jakub Bilski (born on 11 August 1988) is a former professional German swimmer, the 2009 World Games bronze medalist. Also a FinTech businessman, he is a founder and a board member of The NAGA Group AG.

== Biography ==
=== Early years ===
Benjamin "Ben" Bilski grew up in Frankfurt. His family is from Wrocław region.

He now resides in Hamburg.

=== Education ===
- He graduated from the Wiesbaden Carl-von-Ossietzky-Gymnasium in 2008.
- In 2010, after finishing his swimming career, he started studying BA in accadis Hochschule Bad Homburg.
- In 2013 he started his MA program in the EBS University of Business and Law. Next year he graduated with a master's degree in management.
- He was on the list in 2018 Forbes 30 under 30 (Category Technology)

== Sporting career ==
Benjamin officially entered competitive swimming in November, 2002, at the age of 14. He began swimming in SG Wetterau. In 2004 he was accepted to the German national team. Throughout his career, Bilski has won several regional and Southern German championships.

He reached a pinnacle in his sporting career in 2009 with a bronze medal of the IOC-backed World Games in Kaohsiung with the German record. Next year Bilski finished his professional career. “I was never a high flyer, but I had a steady development” – Benjamin Bilski commented at the end of his swimming career.

=== Achievements ===
- German Junior Champion in 200 m freestyle (2006)
- 5th at the European Junior Swimming Championship, Mallorca (2006)
- German Runner-up in 200 m butterfly (2008)
- 7th in 200 m freestyle, World Cup in Berlin (2008)
- German champion in 4 × 200 m freestyle relay, Berlin (2008)
- German Runner-up in 200 m butterfly (2009)
- 3rd in 200 m backstroke at the German Short Course Championship (2009)
- Winner in German team standings for SC Wiesbaden (2008)
- 3rd in 200 m obstacle swimming course at the 2009 World Games in Kaohsiung, with the German record (1:57,00 min).

=== Record ===
German record
200 m obstacle swimming	01:57,00 min	23 July 2009	Kaohsiung, Taiwan
