= Olga Kostenko =

Russian canoeist (born 1984)

Olga Kostenko (born December 26, 1984) is a Russian sprint canoer who has competed since the mid-2000s. At the 2004 Summer Olympics in Athens, she was eliminated in the semifinals of the K-1 500 m event.
