= Radka Brožková =

Czech orienteering competitor

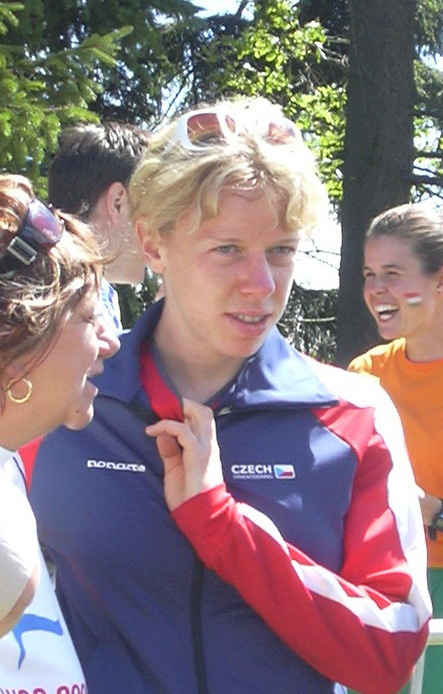
- Brožková at WOC 2008

Medal record

Women's orienteering

Representing Czech Republic

World Championships
Bronze medal – third place	2008 Olomouc	Middle

Junior World Championships
Silver medal – second place	2004 Gdańsk	Middle

Radka Brožková (born 21 June 1984 in Rovensko pod Troskami) is a Czech orienteering competitor, bronze medallist from the world championships.

She received a silver medal in middle distance and finished 4th in the relay at the Junior World Orienteering Championships in Gdynia in 2004.

She received a bronze medal in the middle distance at the 2008 World Orienteering Championships in Olomouc, behind Minna Kauppi and Vroni König-Salmi.

== See also ==
- Czech orienteers
- List of orienteers
- List of orienteering events
