= Dana Brožková =

Czech orienteering competitor

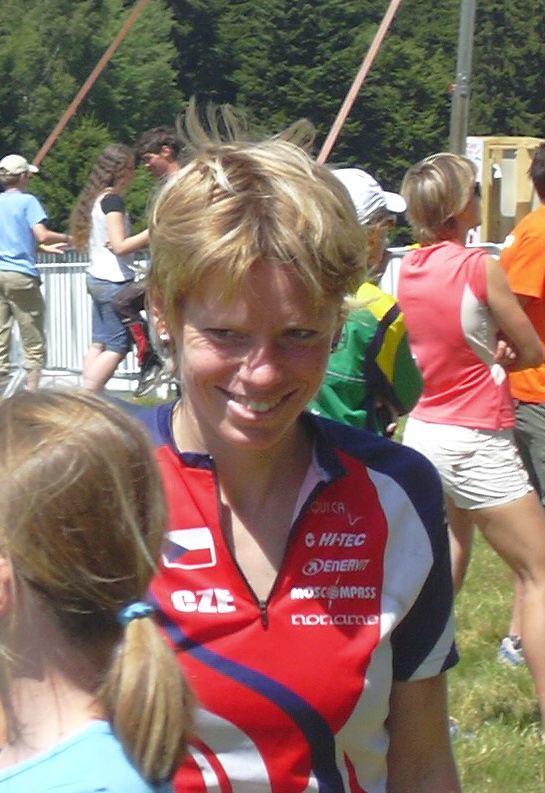
- Dana Brožková at WOC 2008

Medal record

Women's orienteering

Representing Czech Republic

World Championships
Gold medal – first place	2009 Miskolc	Middle
Gold medal – first place	2008 Olomouc	Long
Silver medal – second place	2011 Savoie	Long
Silver medal – second place	2011 Savoie	Relay
Bronze medal – third place	2006 Aarhus	Long

European Championships
Silver medal – second place	2010 Primorsko	Long

Junior World Championships
Gold medal – first place	2001 Miskolc	Classic
Silver medal – second place	2001 Miskolc	Relay

Dana Šafka Brožková (born 28 April 1981 in Rovensko pod Troskami) is a Czech orienteering competitor. She is the 2008 World Champion in the long distance and 2009 World Champion in the middle distance. She received a bronze medal in the long distance at the 2006 World Orienteering Championships in Aarhus. She is Junior World Champion from 2001, when she won the classic distance.

Her sister Radka has also represented the Czech national orienteering team.

== See also ==
- Czech orienteers
- List of orienteers
- List of orienteering events
