= Aline Hundt =

German pianist, conductor, and composer

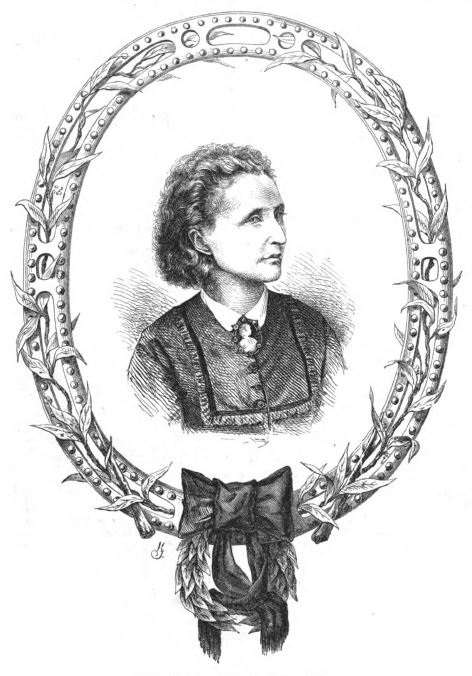
Aline Hundt (Die Frauenwelt: illustrirte Muster- und Modezeitung, 31. März 1872, S. 89)

Aline Hundt (8 February, 1835 in Mecklenburg; † 23 January, 1872 in Berlin) was a German pianist, piano teacher, conductor, and composer. She studied piano with Franz Liszt.

== Life ==
=== Education and career ===
Aline Hundt studied composition at the Stern Conservatory in Berlin. In 1860, through Hans von Bülow, she became a piano pupil of Franz Liszt in Weimar, who held her in high esteem and encouraged her. Arthur Elson's Women in Music described Hundt as "one of Liszt's best pupils." She was appointed Saxon-Weimar court pianist and was appointed piano teacher to Princess Marie of Saxe-Weimar. She also gave concerts in Magdeburg, Leipzig and Karlsruhe. After her time at the Weimar court, she undertook journeys to Paris and Italy from 1865 onwards. In Stuttgart, where she lived at the end of the 1860s, she composed larger orchestral works, choirs and chamber music. There she also became friends with the court conductor and composer Karl Eckert and his wife, who ran a musical house where she frequented regularly. When Eckert was appointed court conductor in Berlin, Hundt soon followed. There she performed her own works, including at the opera house Unter den Linden. On 28 March 1871, she conducted her symphony herself in a concert at the Singakademie – she was probably the first woman to conduct the orchestra, which was made up exclusively of men. A year later, at the age of 36, she died of pulmonary tuberculosis.

=== Reception ===
The Berliner Musikzeitung reported on her concert at the Singakademie:

Last Tuesday, March 28th, Miss Aline Hundt organized a concert at the Singakademie, in which she appeared before the audience as a composer and conductor with a symphony in G minor and a march for large orchestra. In this symphony, however, things are different from the symphonies we know so far, there is perhaps a little too much instrumental noise every now and then, but there are never unpleasant scenes, but there are always new changing melodies, timbres and other orchestral effects. We have to agree with a proven local critic when he compares the symphony to a kaleidoscope that evokes eternally new images – [...]. As a conductor, Miss Hundt is as sure as if she had been born with the baton at birth, and many a conductor could learn from her as far as energy is concerned. [...]

Another review in the same publication stated:

Last week, the composer Kraulein Aline Hundt performed before a very small circle of listeners a number of orchestral works of her own composition, including a symphony, a fantasy, a march in a larger style, etc. We confess that the talent of the lady, as well as her extraordinarily interesting performance of the orchestra, have impressed us to a great extent, and that we would be sincerely pleased if we would like to meet her works in the context of a larger, public concert.

Hundt's reputation extended internationally, even appearing in the British publication The Lady's Own Paper.

== Selected works ==
=== Orchestral works ===
- Sinfonie g-Moll (1871)
- Prometheus-Feuer-Galopp f. Orch. op. 10, Berlin 1871

=== Piano solo ===
- Phantasie für Piano, op. 1, Leipzig und Dresden: Klemm 1861
- Trois Fantaisie-Caprices pour le Piano op. 2, Leipzig und Dresden: Klemm 1861
- 9 Stimmungsbilder op. 3 (1863)
- Ballade op. 4, Leipzig: Gustav Heinze 1863.
- Manzanillo-Galopp nach Motiven d. Oper Die Afrikanerin, v. Meyerbeer op. 5, Berlin 1867
- Apollo-Marsch op. 11, Berlin 1867
- Werke ohne Opuszahl: Mazurka-Caprice für Klavier, Berlin: Challier o. J.; Polka für Klavier, Berlin: Challier: o. J.; Valse

=== Chamber music ===
- Traumgestalten. Zwei Stücke für Pianoforte und Viola (oder Violine) op. 6, Kassel o. J.
- Capriccio à la Hongroise f. Viol. mit Begleitung des Pianofortes op. 12, Berlin: Boote & Bock o. J.
