= John Gatfield =

New Zealand swimmer and coach

Personal information
- Born: June 15, 1990 (age 36) Upper Hutt, New Zealand

Sport
- Sport: Swimming
Medal record
Representing New Zealand
World Games
Silver medal – second place	2009 Kaohsiung	Team

John Gatfield (born 15 June 1990) is a former swimmer and current swimming coach from New Zealand. At age 13, Gatfield was the youngest person to swim Cook Strait. Gatfield is a multiple-time New Zealand and Australian Age Swimming Champion, finaling at the 2008 FINA Youth World Swimming Championships and medaling at the 2009 FINA Swimming World Cup in Singapore in the 200m IM.

At 24, Gatfield was named Head Coach of Coast Swim Club NZ, placing swimmers on Commonwealth Games and World Championship Teams.

In 2018, Gatfield was named as Assistant Head Coach of the powerhouse swimming club St Peter's Western QLD, Australia.

Gatfield was named as Team Coach to the 2019 World Aquatics Championships in Gwangju, Korea.
