= Johanna Allston =

Australian orienteer (born 1986)

Medal record

Women's orienteering

Representing Australia

World Championships
Gold medal – first place	2006 Aarhus	Sprint

Junior World Championships
Gold medal – first place	2006 Druskininkai	Long
Silver medal – second place	2006 Druskininkai	Sprint
Bronze medal – third place	2005 Tenero	Middle

World Games
Gold medal – first place	2009 Kaohsiung	Middle
Silver medal – second place	2009 Kaohsiung	Sprint

Johanna "Hanny" Allston (born 12 February 1986) is an Australian orienteer.

Johanna Allston, or Hanny Allston as many know her, won the 2006 Junior World Orienteering Championships for the long distance event. She won by a near-record margin of 4 minutes and 38 seconds. She is the first Australian woman orienteer ever to win a gold medal at a World Championship level.

When she won her gold medal, it was her last year of eligibility to run in the Junior World Championships.

At the 2006 World Orienteering Championships, she claimed gold in the Sprint event. This is the best result by an Australian in the history of the event. Also, she became the first person to win both Senior and Junior World Orienteering Championship titles in the same year.

Hanny currently resides in Hobart, Tasmania where she runs a retail outlet in the CBD selling outdoor sports equipment and life coaching services.

In early 2015, she won the Six Foot Track Marathon in a female course record of 3h 34m 50s.

== See also ==
- List of orienteers
- List of orienteering events
