= Elise Egseth =

Norwegian orienteer (born 1985)

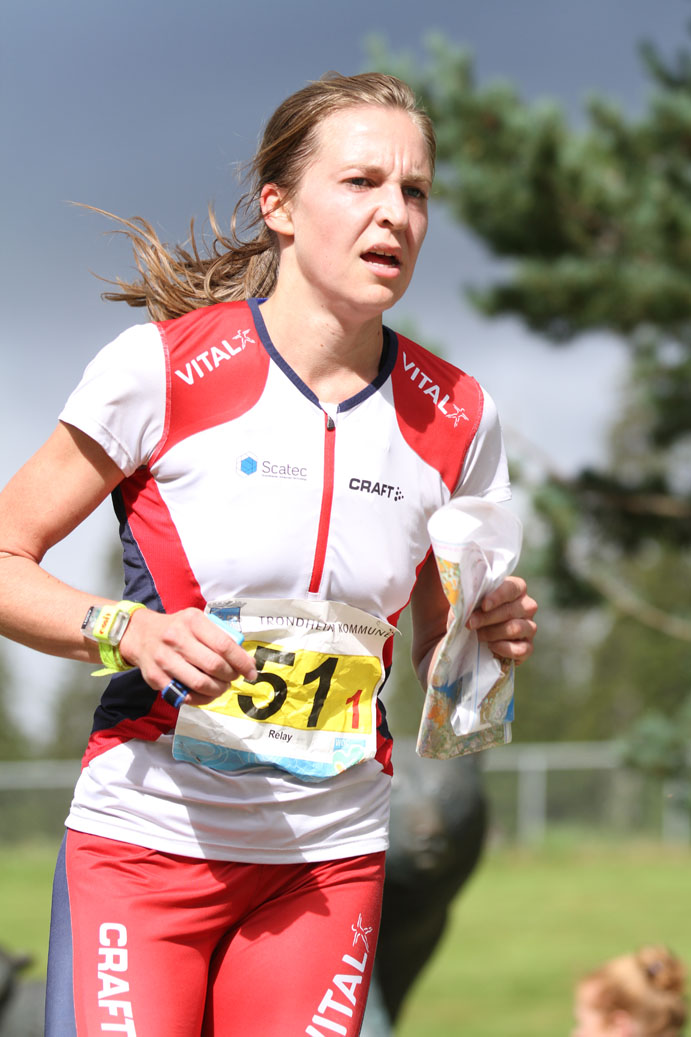
- Egseth at the 2010 world championships in Trondheim

Personal information
- Born: 12 May 1985 (age 41)

Sport
- Sport: Orienteering
Medal record
Women's orienteering
Representing Norway
World Championships
Silver medal – second place	2010 Trondheim	Relay
Silver medal – second place	2015 Inverness	Sprint Relay
Junior World Championships
Gold medal – first place	2005 Tenero	Relay
Silver medal – second place	2005 Tenero	Long
Bronze medal – third place	2004 Gdańsk	Relay
World Games
Bronze medal – third place	2009 Kaohsiung	Sprint
Bronze medal – third place	2009 Kaohsiung	Mixed Relay

Elise Egseth (born 12 May 1985) is a Norwegian orienteering competitor and junior world champion.

== Junior career ==
Egseth won a gold medal in the relay at the 2005 Junior World Orienteering Championships in Tenero, together with Mari Fasting and Betty Ann Bjerkreim Nilsen. She also received a silver medal in the long course in 2005, and a bronze medal in the relay in 2004.

== Senior career ==
Egseth participated in the Orienteering World Cup in 2007, finishing 38th overall. At the European Orienteering Championships in Ventspils 2008 she finished 15th in the sprint distance.
