= Bodil Holmström =

Finnish orienteering competitor

Medal record

Women's orienteering

Representing Finland

World Championships
Bronze medal – third place	2009 Miskolc	Relay

World Games
Silver medal – second place	2009 Kaohsiung	Relay

Junior World Championships
Bronze medal – third place	2001 Miskolc	Relay

Bodil Holmström (born 19 June 1981) is a Finnish orienteering competitor. She won a bronze medal in the relay at the 2001 Junior World Orienteering Championships in Miskolc. She competed at the World Games in 2009, where she won a silver medal in the relay, and placed 7th in the sprint and 12th in the middle distance. At the 2009 World Orienteering Championships in Miskolc she won a bronze medal with the Finnish relay team.
