= Linnea Gustafsson =

Swedish orienteering competitor

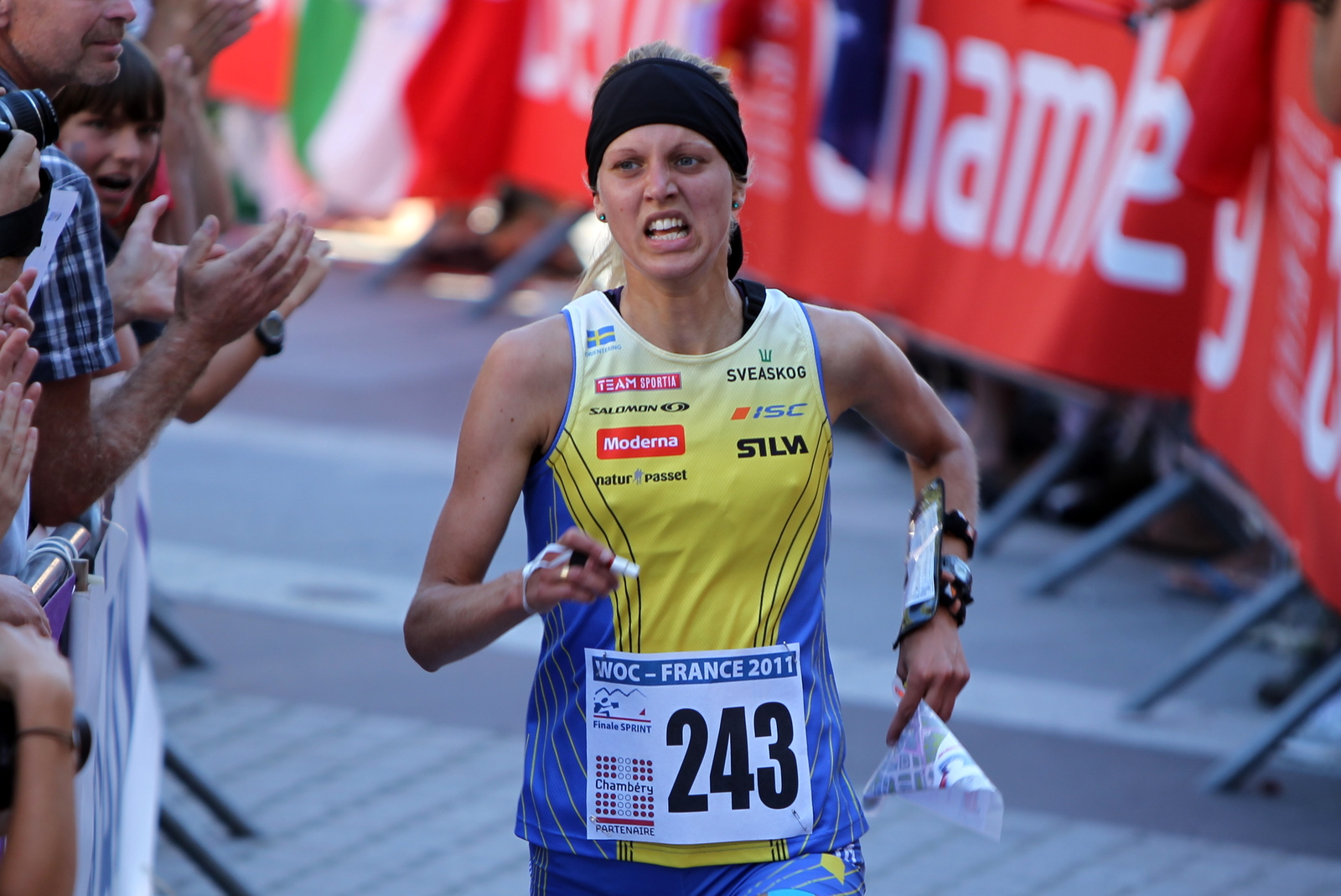
- Gustafsson at WOC 2011 (sprint)

Medal record

Women's orienteering

Representing Sweden

World Championships
Gold medal – first place	2011 Savoie	Sprint
Silver medal – second place	2009 Miskolc	Sprint

World Games
Bronze medal – third place	2009 Kaohsiung	Middle

Linnea Gustafsson (born 20 February 1986 in Fole) is a Swedish orienteering competitor. She won a bronze medal in the middle distance and finished fifth in the sprint at the World Games in 2009. She won a silver medal in sprint at the 2009 World Orienteering Championships in Miskolc, Hungary.
