= Minna Kauppi =

Finnish orienteer

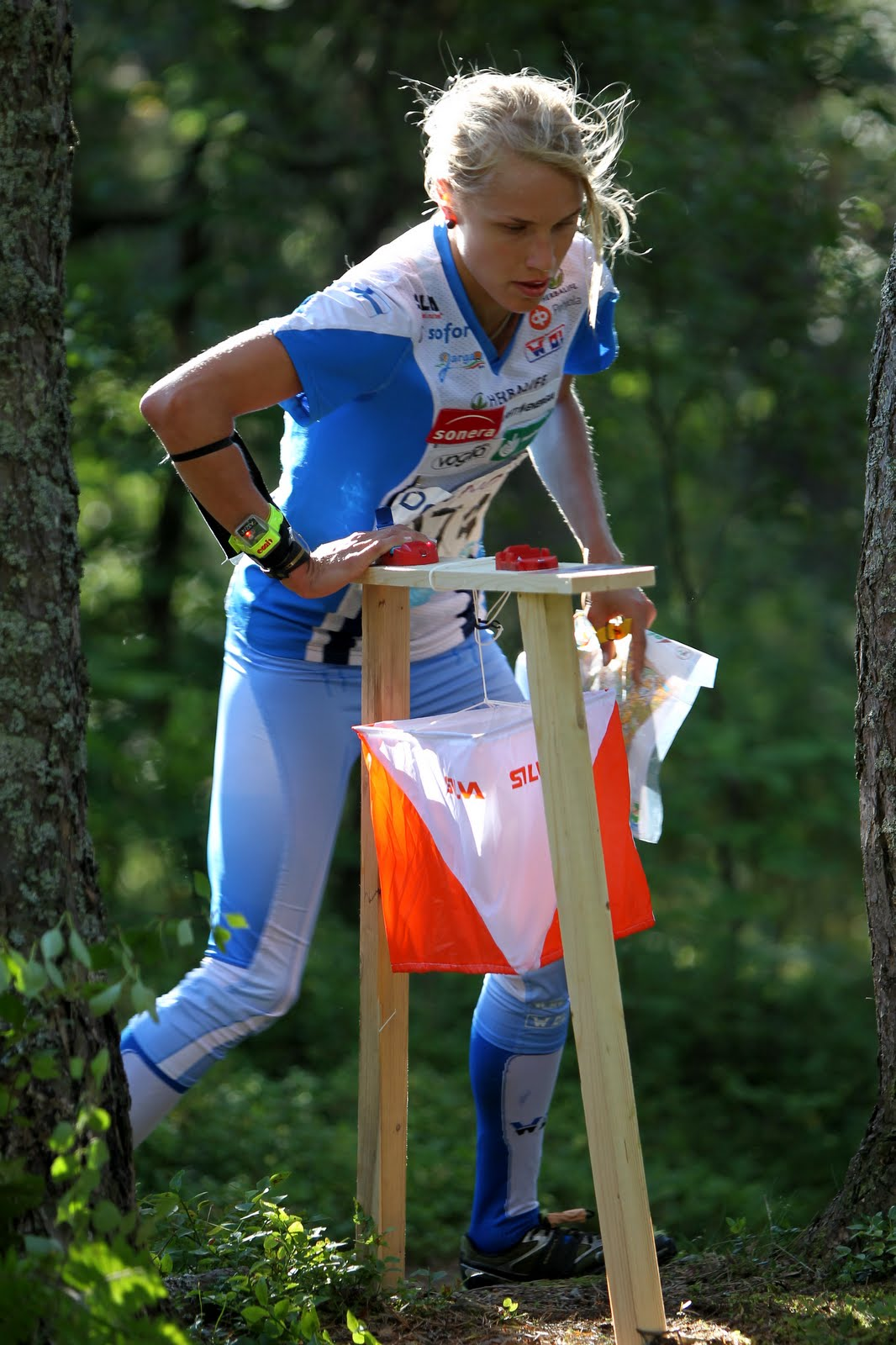

Personal information
- Born: 25 November 1982 (age 43) Asikkala, Finland

Sport
- Sport: Orienteering
Medal record
Women's orienteering
Representing Finland
World Championships
Gold medal – first place	2006 Aarhus	Relay
Gold medal – first place	2007 Kyiv	Long
Gold medal – first place	2007 Kyiv	Relay
Gold medal – first place	2008 Olomouc	Middle
Gold medal – first place	2008 Olomouc	Relay
Gold medal – first place	2010 Trondheim	Middle
Gold medal – first place	2010 Trondheim	Relay
Gold medal – first place	2011 Savoie	Relay
Gold medal – first place	2012 Lausanne	Middle
Silver medal – second place	2004 Västerås	Relay
Silver medal – second place	2007 Kyiv	Sprint
Silver medal – second place	2008 Olomouc	Sprint
Silver medal – second place	2012 Lausanne	Long
Silver medal – second place	2013 Vuokatti	Relay
Bronze medal – third place	2005 Aichi	Middle
Bronze medal – third place	2009 Miskolc	Long
Bronze medal – third place	2009 Miskolc	Relay
World Cup
Silver medal – second place	2008	WC Overall
Silver medal – second place	2011	WC Overall
Bronze medal – third place	2006	WC Overall
Bronze medal – third place	2007	WC Overall
European Championships
Gold medal – first place	2006 Otepää	Relay
Gold medal – first place	2006 Otepää	Middle
Silver medal – second place	2010 Primorsko	Relay
Silver medal – second place	2012 Falun	Middle
Silver medal – second place	2012 Falun	Relay
Bronze medal – third place	2006 Otepää	Sprint
Bronze medal – third place	2006 Otepää	Long
Bronze medal – third place	2008 Ventspils	Middle
Bronze medal – third place	2008 Ventspils	Relay
Bronze medal – third place	2012 Falun	Long
World Games
Gold medal – first place	2009 Kaohsiung	Sprint
Gold medal – first place	2013 Cali	Middle
Silver medal – second place	2009 Kaohsiung	Middle
Silver medal – second place	2009 Kaohsiung	Mixed Relay
Junior World Championships
Gold medal – first place	2001 Miskolc	Short
Gold medal – first place	2002 Alicante	Short
Silver medal – second place	2002 Alicante	Relay
Bronze medal – third place	2000 Nove Mesto	Short
Bronze medal – third place	2000 Nove Mesto	Relay
Bronze medal – third place	2001 Miskolc	Relay
Bronze medal – third place	2002 Alicante	Classic

Minna Kauppi (born 25 November 1982) is a Finnish orienteer, who was born in Asikkala and lives in Lahti. Kauppi is a nine-time World Champion, including five golds from relays. Kauppi is the most successful Finnish orienteer of all time when ranked by number of gold medals at the World Orienteering Championships. Kauppi was named Finnish Sports Personality of the Year in 2010.

== Biography ==
Kauppi was the third child of Ritva and Hannu Kauppi. Just before Ritva gave birth to Minna, Ritva was diagnosed with multiple sclerosis at the age of 30. Minna was born at the Päijät-Häme Central Hospital.

Kauppi enjoyed junior success, winning the 2001 and 2002 Junior World Orienteering Championships in the short distance and receiving two medals in the 2000 championships. Kauppi joined the Finnish national team in 2003.

In 2005, Kauppi's mother died during the 2005 Jukola relay, and Kauppi was informed just after finishing. Later the same year, Kauppi won her first senior medal in orienteering, a bronze in the Middle Distance at the 2005 World Orienteering Championships in Japan. Kauppi went on to win her first gold medal in the relay at the 2006 World Orienteering Championships and her first individual medal in the 2007 World Orienteering Championships, which was shared with her rival Heli Jukkola. Kauppi anchored her Finnish club Asikkalan Raikas to a victory in the 2007 Venla relay.

Kauppi's period of greatest success lasted from 2007 until 2012, when she won her last gold medal at the World Championships in the Middle Distance. In 2015, Kauppi moved to Lahti and announced the end of her national team career. In 2020, Kauppi's biography was published. A statue of Kauppi was unveiled in Vääksy in 2012.

== Style of Orienteering ==
Kauppi at the peak of her career was known for her remarkable running speed, but also for her propensity to be inconsistent with her performances. Janne Salmi, a coach of Kauppi, stated that her success was due to several factors, including her physical fitness with a range of different sports including skiing and middle-distance running. Salmi also praised Kauppi's ability to receive coaching, and also suggested that her rivalry with Heli Jukkola and cohabiting with fellow national team runner Pasi Ikonen helped her improve.

== Personal life ==
Her partner is Sipe Santapukki, a musician, with whom she has two children born in 2017 and 2020. Kauppi used to be in a relationship with fellow orienteer Pasi Ikonen. Kauppi has Crohn's disease.

== See also ==
- List of orienteers
- List of orienteering events
