= China at the 2008 Summer Olympics =

- Flag of China
- IOC code: CHN
- NOC: Chinese Olympic Committee
- Website: www.olympic.cn (in Chinese and English)

in Beijing
- Competitors: 639 in 28 sports
- Flag bearers: Yao Ming (opening); Zhang Ning (closing)
- Medals Ranked 1st: Gold 48 Silver 22 Bronze 30 Total 100

Summer Olympics appearances (overview)
- 1952; 1956–1980; 1984; 1988; 1992; 1996; 2000; 2004; 2008; 2012; 2016; 2020; 2024; 2028

Other related appearances
- Republic of China (1924–1948)

China was the host nation of the 2008 Summer Olympics. It was represented by the Chinese Olympic Committee (COC), and the team of selected athletes were officially known as Team China.

As the host country, China had a total of 639 athletes qualified for places on the national team, being the largest in its Olympic history. Chinese athletes qualified to compete in all 28 Olympic sports for the first time. Among these athletes, 469 were competing at their first Olympics, 165 had competed in Athens 2004, and 37 in Sydney 2000. Diver Guo Jingjing, shooter Tan Zongliang and basketballer Li Nan, made their fourth Olympic appearances, having first competed in Atlanta 1996. China also included 460 officials, making a total of 1,099 delegates. According to Olympic protocol, China entered as the last nation into the Beijing National Stadium during the opening ceremony, and was led by basketballer Yao Ming and Lin Hao, a 9-year-old primary school student who had rescued two schoolmates during the 2008 Sichuan earthquake.

China dominated the rankings for the first time with 51 gold medals (China was later stripped of 3 golds in weightlifting for doping violations). In 2009, Team China won the Laureus World Sports Awards for the Best Team of the Year. The team excluded athletes from the Special Administrative Region of Hong Kong, which competed separately as Hong Kong, China.

== Medalists ==
China won a total of 100 medals, 48 gold, 22 silver, and 30 bronze, which became its largest ever medal tally in Olympic history. On August 17, 2008, China achieved its greatest ever Olympic performance when the women's table tennis team defeated Singapore in the final to claim the nation's 33rd gold medal, surpassing the previous best tally of 32 at Athens 2004.

Medal	Name	Sport	Event	Date
Gold	Pang Wei	Shooting	Men's 10 m air pistol	August 9
Gold	Guo Wenjun	Shooting	Women's 10 m air pistol	August 10
Gold	Guo Jingjing; Wu Minxia	Diving	Women's 3 m synchronized springboard	August 10
Gold	Xian Dongmei	Judo	Women's 52 kg	August 10
Gold	Long Qingquan	Weightlifting	Men's 56 kg	August 10
Gold	Huo Liang; Lin Yue	Diving	Men's 10 m synchronized platform	August 11
Gold	Chen Yanqing	Weightlifting	Women's 58 kg	August 11
Gold	Zhang Xiangxiang	Weightlifting	Men's 62 kg	August 11
Gold	Huang Xu; Chen Yibing; Li Xiaopeng; Xiao Qin; Yang Wei; Zou Kai	Gymnastics	Men's artistic team all-around	August 12
Gold	Chen Ruolin; Wang Xin	Diving	Women's 10 m synchronized platform	August 12
Gold	Zhong Man	Fencing	Men's sabre	August 12
Gold	Liao Hui	Weightlifting	Men's 69 kg	August 12
Gold	Yang Yilin; Cheng Fei; Jiang Yuyuan; Deng Linlin; He Kexin; Li Shanshan	Gymnastics	Women's artistic team all-around	August 13
Gold	Chen Ying	Shooting	Women's 25 metre pistol	August 13
Gold	Wang Feng; Qin Kai	Diving	Men's 3 m synchronized springboard	August 13
Gold	Liu Zige	Swimming	Women's 200 m butterfly	August 14
Gold	Du Li	Shooting	Women's 50 m rifle 3 positions	August 14
Gold	Yang Wei	Gymnastics	Men's artistic individual all-around	August 14
Gold	Zhang Juanjuan	Archery	Women's individual	August 14
Gold	Yang Xiuli	Judo	Women's 78 kg	August 14
Gold	Tong Wen	Judo	Women's +78 kg	August 15
Gold	Lu Yong	Weightlifting	Men's 85 kg	August 15
Gold	Du Jing; Yu Yang	Badminton	Women's doubles	August 15
Gold	Zhang Ning	Badminton	Women's singles	August 16
Gold	Qiu Jian	Shooting	Men's 50 m rifle 3 positions	August 17
Gold	Tang Bin; Xi Aihua; Jin Ziwei; Feng Guixin	Rowing	Women's quadruple sculls	August 17
Gold	Wang Jiao	Wrestling	Women's freestyle 72 kg	August 17
Gold	Zou Kai	Gymnastics	Men's floor	August 17
Gold	Xiao Qin	Gymnastics	Men's pommel horse	August 17
Gold	Guo Yue; Wang Nan; Zhang Yining	Table tennis	Women's team	August 17
Gold	Lin Dan	Badminton	Men's singles	August 17
Gold	Guo Jingjing	Diving	Women's 3 m springboard	August 17
Gold	Chen Yibing	Gymnastics	Men's rings	August 18
Gold	He Kexin	Gymnastics	Women's uneven bars	August 18
Gold	He Wenna	Gymnastics	Women's trampoline	August 18
Gold	Ma Lin; Wang Hao; Wang Liqin	Table tennis	Men's team	August 18
Gold	Li Xiaopeng	Gymnastics	Men's parallel bars	August 19
Gold	Zou Kai	Gymnastics	Men's horizontal bar	August 19
Gold	Lu Chunlong	Gymnastics	Men's trampoline	August 19
Gold	He Chong	Diving	Men's 3 m springboard	August 19
Gold	Yin Jian	Sailing	Women's RS:X	August 20
Gold	Wu Jingyu	Taekwondo	Women's 49 kg	August 20
Gold	Chen Ruolin	Diving	Women's 10 m platform	August 21
Gold	Zhang Yining	Table tennis	Women's singles	August 22
Gold	Meng Guanliang; Yang Wenjun	Canoeing – Flatwater	Men's C-2 500 m	August 23
Gold	Ma Lin	Table tennis	Men's singles	August 23
Gold	Zou Shiming	Boxing	Light flyweight	August 24
Gold	Zhang Xiaoping	Boxing	Light heavyweight	August 24
Silver	Zhang Lin	Swimming	Men's 400 m freestyle	August 10
Silver	Zhang Juanjuan; Chen Ling; Guo Dan	Archery	Women's team	August 10
Silver	Zhu Qinan	Shooting	Men's 10 m air rifle	August 11
Silver	Tan Zongliang	Shooting	Men's 50 m pistol	August 12
Silver	Chang Yongxiang	Wrestling	Men's Greco-Roman 74 kg	August 13
Silver	Li Hongli	Weightlifting	Men's 77 kg	August 13
Silver	Jiao Liuyang	Swimming	Women's 200 m butterfly	August 14
Silver	Yang Yu; Zhu Qianwei; Tan Miao; Pang Jiaying; Tang Jingzhi	Swimming	Women's 4 × 200 m freestyle relay	August 14
Silver	Bao Yingying; Huang Haiyang; Ni Hong; Tan Xue	Fencing	Women's team sabre	August 14
Silver	Xie Xingfang	Badminton	Women's singles	August 16
Silver	Wu You; Gao Yulan	Rowing	Women's coxless pair	August 16
Silver	Xu Li	Wrestling	Women's freestyle 55 kg	August 16
Silver	Cai Yun; Fu Haifeng	Badminton	Men's doubles	August 16
Silver	Yang Wei	Gymnastics	Men's rings	August 18
Silver	Zhang Wenxiu	Athletics	Women's hammer throw	August 20
Silver	Tian Jia; Wang Jie	Beach volleyball	Women's tournament	August 21
Silver	Wang Nan	Table tennis	Women's singles	August 22
Silver	China women's national field hockey team: Cheng Hui; Chen Qiuqi; Chen Zhaoxia; Fu Baorong; Gao Lihua; Huang Junxia; Li Hongxia; Li Shuang; Ma Yibo; Pan Fengzhen; Ren Ye; Song Qingling; Tang Chunling; Zhao Yudiao; Zhang Yimeng; Zhou Wanfeng	Field hockey	Women's tournament	August 22
Silver	Wang Hao	Table tennis	Men's singles	August 23
Silver	Zhou Lüxin	Diving	Men's 10 m platform	August 23
Silver	Cai Tongtong; Chou Tao; Lü Yuanyang; Sui Jianshuang; Sun Dan; Zhang Shuo	Gymnastics	Women's rhythmic team all-around	August 24
Silver	Zhang Zhilei	Boxing	Super heavyweight	August 24
Bronze	Xue Haifeng; Jiang Lin; Li Wenquan	Archery	Men's team	August 11
Bronze	Xu Yan	Judo	Women's 57 kg	August 11
Bronze	Hu Binyuan	Shooting	Men's Double trap	August 12
Bronze	Pang Jiaying	Swimming	Women's 200 m freestyle	August 13
Bronze	Yang Yilin	Gymnastics	Women's artistic individual all-around	August 15
Bronze	Gong Lijiao	Athletics	Women's shot put	August 16
Bronze	Zhang Yawen; Wei Yili	Badminton	Women's doubles	August 15
Bronze	Chen Jin	Badminton	Men's singles	August 16
Bronze	Zhao Jing; Sun Ye; Zhou Yafei; Pang Jiaying; Xu Tianlongzi	Swimming	Women's 4 × 100 m medley relay	August 17
Bronze	Zhou Chunxiu	Athletics	Women's marathon	August 17
Bronze	Yan Zi; Zheng Jie	Tennis	Women's doubles	August 17
Bronze	He Hanbin; Yu Yang	Badminton	Mixed doubles	August 17
Bronze	Cheng Fei	Gymnastics	Women's vault	August 17
Bronze	Wu Minxia	Diving	Women's 3 m springboard	August 17
Bronze	Yang Yilin	Gymnastics	Women's uneven bars	August 18
Bronze	Song Aimin	Athletics	Women's discus throw	August 18
Bronze	Xu Lijia	Sailing	Women's Laser Radial class	August 19
Bronze	Cheng Fei	Gymnastics	Women's balance beam	August 19
Bronze	Guo Shuang	Cycling	Women's sprint	August 19
Bronze	Dong Dong	Gymnastics	Men's trampoline	August 19
Bronze	Qin Kai	Diving	Men's 3 m springboard	August 19
Bronze	Xue Chen; Zhang Xi	Beach volleyball	Women's tournament	August 21
Bronze	Wang Xin	Diving	Women's 10 m platform	August 21
Bronze	Zhu Guo	Taekwondo	Men's 80 kg	August 22
Bronze	Guo Yue	Table tennis	Women's singles	August 22
Bronze	Hanati Silamu	Boxing	Welterweight	August 22
Bronze	China women's national volleyball team: Wang Yimei; Feng Kun; Yang Hao; Liu Yanan; Wei Qiuyue; Xu Yunli; Zhou Suhong; Zhao Ruirui; Xue Ming; Li Juan; Zhang Na; Ma Yunwen	Volleyball	Women's tournament	August 23
Bronze	Gu Beibei; Huang Xuechen; Jiang Tingting; Jiang Wenwen; Liu Ou; Luo Xi; Sun Qiuting; Wang Na; Zhang Xiaohuan	Synchronized swimming	Women's team	August 23
Bronze	Wang Liqin	Table tennis	Men's singles	August 23
Bronze	Sheng Jiang	Wrestling	Men's Greco-Roman 60 kg	August 12

Medals by sport
Sport	1st place, gold medalist(s)	2nd place, silver medalist(s)	3rd place, bronze medalist(s)	Total
Gymnastics	11	2	5	18
Weightlifting	5	1	0	6
Diving	7	1	3	11
Shooting	5	2	1	8
Table tennis	4	2	2	8
Badminton	3	2	3	8
Judo	3	0	1	4
Boxing	2	1	1	4
Swimming	1	3	3	7
Wrestling	1	2	1	4
Archery	1	1	1	3
Rowing	1	1	0	2
Fencing	1	1	0	2
Taekwondo	1	0	1	2
Sailing	1	0	1	2
Canoeing	1	0	0	1
Volleyball	0	1	2	3
Field hockey	0	1	0	1
Athletics	0	1	3	4
Cycling	0	0	1	1
Tennis	0	0	1	1
Total	48	22	30	100

Medals by date
Day	Date	1st place, gold medalist(s)	2nd place, silver medalist(s)	3rd place, bronze medalist(s)	Total
Day 1	9th	1	0	0	1
Day 2	10th	4	2	0	6
Day 3	11th	3	1	2	6
Day 4	12th	4	1	2	7
Day 5	13th	3	2	1	6
Day 6	14th	5	3	0	8
Day 7	15th	3	0	2	5
Day 8	16th	1	4	2	7
Day 9	17th	8	0	6	14
Day 10	18th	4	1	2	7
Day 11	19th	4	0	5	9
Day 12	20th	2	1	0	3
Day 13	21st	1	1	2	4
Day 14	22nd	1	2	3	6
Day 15	23rd	2	2	3	7
Day 16	24th	2	2	0	4
Total		48	22	30	100

Multiple medalists
Name	Sport	1st place, gold medalist(s)	2nd place, silver medalist(s)	3rd place, bronze medalist(s)	Total
Zou Kai	Gymnastics	3	0	0	3
Yang Wei	Gymnastics	2	1	0	3
He Kexin	Gymnastics	2	0	0	2
Chen Yibing	Gymnastics	2	0	0	2
Li Xiaopeng	Gymnastics	2	0	0	2
Xiao Qin	Gymnastics	2	0	0	2
Guo Jingjing	Diving	2	0	0	2
Chen Ruolin	Diving	2	0	0	2
Zhang Yining	Table tennis	2	0	0	2
Ma Lin	Table tennis	2	0	0	2
Wang Nan	Table tennis	1	1	0	2
Wang Hao	Table tennis	1	1	0	2
Zhang Juanjuan	Archery	1	1	0	2
Cheng Fei	Gymnastics	1	0	2	3
Yang Yilin	Gymnastics	1	0	2	3
Qin Kai	Diving	1	0	1	2
Wu Minxia	Diving	1	0	1	2
Wang Xin	Diving	1	0	1	2
Guo Yue	Table tennis	1	0	1	2
Wang Liqin	Table tennis	1	0	1	2
Yu Yang	Badminton	1	0	1	2
Pang Jiaying	Swimming	0	1	2	3

Won all medals in one event

- Women's singles table tennis
- Men's singles table tennis

Won all gold medals in one sport

- Table tennis (4 gold)
- Trampoline (2 gold)

Won gold medals in both men's and women's events where only one entry is allowed

- Synchronized 3 metre springboard diving
- Synchronized 10 metre platform diving
- Team all-around gymnastics
- Team table tennis

== Archery ==
As the host nation, China automatically received a full complement of six quota spots (three for men, three for women) for the archery competitions. China's national selection competition resulted in Xue Haifeng, Jiang Lin and Li Wenquan taking the three men's spots, while Zhang Juanjuan, Chen Ling and Guo Dan earned the women's spots. Xue and Zhang were both veteran athletes from 2004 Athens, with the latter taking China's fourth silver medal in archery. On August 14, Zhang Juanjuan became the first Chinese archer to win a gold medal in the women's individual event.

Men

Athlete	Event	Ranking round		Round of 64	Round of 32	Round of 16	Quarterfinals	Semifinals	Final / BM	
Athlete	Event	Score	Seed	Opposition Score	Opposition Score	Opposition Score	Opposition Score	Opposition Score	Opposition Score	Rank
Jiang Lin	Individual	632	55	Lee C-H (KOR) (10); L 108–112	Did not advance					
Li Wenquan	Individual	646	46	Proć (POL) (19); L 111–116	Did not advance					
Xue Haifeng	Individual	663	18	Lyon (CAN) (47); L 106–111	Did not advance					
Jiang Lin; Li Wenquan; Xue Haifeng	Team	1941	12	—N/a		Great Britain (5); W 214–210	Russia (4); W 217–209	South Korea (1); L 221–218	Ukraine (2); W 222–219	3rd place, bronze medalist(s)

Women

Athlete	Event	Ranking round		Round of 64	Round of 32	Round of 16	Quarterfinals	Semifinals	Final / BM	
Athlete	Event	Score	Seed	Opposition Score	Opposition Score	Opposition Score	Opposition Score	Opposition Score	Opposition Score	Rank
Chen Ling	Individual	645	15	Psarra (GRE) (50); W 109–79	Muliuk (BLR) (47); W 106–105	Yun O-H (KOR) (2); L 103–113	Did not advance			
Guo Dan	Individual	636	25	Burgess (GBR) (40); L 104–106	Did not advance					
Zhang Juanjuan	Individual	635	27	Berezhna (UKR) (38); W 109–97	Yuan S-C (TPE) (6); W 110–105	Erdyniyeva (RUS) (11); W 110–98	Joo H-J (KOR) (3); W 106–101	Yun O-H (KOR) (2); W 115–109	Park S-H (KOR) (1); W 110–109	1st place, gold medalist(s)
Chen Ling; Guo Dan; Zhang Juanjuan	Team	1916	3	—N/a		Bye	India (6); W 211–206	Great Britain (2); W 208–202	South Korea (1); L 215– 224	2nd place, silver medalist(s)

== Athletics ==
Key

- Note–Ranks given for track events are within the athlete's heat only
- Q = Qualified for the next round
- q = Qualified for the next round as a fastest loser or, in field events, by position without achieving the qualifying target
- NR = National record
- N/A = Round not applicable for the event
- Bye = Athlete not required to compete in round

Men
Track & road events

Athlete	Event	Heat		Quarterfinal		Semifinal		Final	
Athlete	Event	Result	Rank	Result	Rank	Result	Rank	Result	Rank
Hu Kai	100 m	10.39	4 q	10.40	8	Did not advance			
Zhang Peimeng	200 m	21.06	7	Did not advance					
Liu Xiaosheng	400 m	53.11	8	—N/a		Did not advance			
Li Xiangyu	800 m	1:48.44	5	—N/a		Did not advance			
Ji Wei	110 m hurdles	13.57	3 Q	13.80	6	Did not advance			
Liu Xiang	110 m hurdles	DNF		Did not advance					
Shi Dongpeng	110 m hurdles	13.53	4 Q	13.42	3 Q	13.42	5	Did not advance	
Meng Yan	400 m hurdles	49.73	5	—N/a		Did not advance			
Hu Kai; Liang Jiahong; Lu Bin; Wen Yongyi; Xing Yanan; Zhang Peimeng	4 × 100 m relay	39.13	4 q	—N/a				DSQ	
Deng Haiyang	Marathon	—N/a						2:16:17	25
Li Zhuhong	Marathon	—N/a						2:24:08	51
Ren Longyun	Marathon	—N/a						DNS	
Chu Yafei	20 km walk	—N/a						1:21:17	10
Dong Jimin	20 km walk	—N/a						1:24:34	30
Wang Hao	20 km walk	—N/a						1:19:47	4
Li Jianbo	50 km walk	—N/a						3:52:20	14
Si Tianfeng	50 km walk	—N/a						3:52:58	17
Zhao Chengliang	50 km walk	—N/a						3:56:47	21

Field events

Athlete	Event	Qualification		Final	
Athlete	Event	Distance	Position	Distance	Position
Li Runrun	Long jump	7.70	28	Did not advance	
Zhou Can	Long jump	NM	—	Did not advance	
Gu Junjie	Triple jump	15.94	34	Did not advance	
Li Yanxi	Triple jump	17.30	3 Q	16.77	10
Zhong Minwei	Triple jump	15.59	36	Did not advance	
Huang Haiqiang	High jump	NM	—	Did not advance	
Liu Feiliang	Pole vault	5.55	=20	Did not advance	
Chen Qi	Javelin throw	73.50	23	Did not advance	

Combined events – Decathlon

Athlete	Event	100 m	LJ	SP	HJ	400 m	110H	DT	PV	JT	1500 m	Final	Rank
Qi Haifeng	Result	11.15	7.22	13.40	1.93	49.39	14.60	46.46	4.30	63.09	4:39.32	7835	17
Qi Haifeng	Points	827	866	692	740	843	899	797	702	784	685	7835	17

Women
Track & road events

Athlete	Event	Heat		Quarterfinal		Semifinal		Final	
Athlete	Event	Result	Rank	Result	Rank	Result	Rank	Result	Rank
Wang Jing	100 m	11.87	5	Did not advance					
Liu Qing	1500 m	4:09.27	9	—N/a				Did not advance	
Xue Fei	5000 m	15:13.25	9 q	—N/a				16:09.84	13
Zhang Yingying	5000 m	15:23.81	11	—N/a				Did not advance	
He Pan	5000 m	DNS		—N/a				Did not advance	
Bai Xue	10000 m	—N/a						32:20.27	21
Dong Xiaoqin	10000 m	—N/a						33:03.14	28
Zhang Yingying	10000 m	—N/a						31:31.12	16
Li Zhenzhu	3000 m steeplechase	10:04.05	13	—N/a				Did not advance	
Zhao Yanni	3000 m steeplechase	10:36.77	16	—N/a				Did not advance	
Zhu Yanmei	3000 m steeplechase	9:29.63	7	—N/a				Did not advance	
Chen Jue; Han Ling; Jiang Lan; Qin Wangping; Tao Yujia; Wang Jing	4 × 100 m relay	43.78	4	—N/a				Did not advance	
Chen Jingwen; Han Ling; Wang Jinping; Tang Xiaoyin	4 × 400 m relay	3:30.77	8	—N/a				Did not advance	
Zhang Shujing	Marathon	—N/a						2:35:35	41
Zhou Chunxiu	Marathon	—N/a						2:27:07	3rd place, bronze medalist(s)
Zhu Xiaolin	Marathon	—N/a						2:27:16	4
Liu Hong	20 km walk	—N/a						1:27:17	4
Shi Na	20 km walk	—N/a						1:29:08	13
Yang Mingxia	20 km walk	—N/a						DSQ	

Field events

Athlete	Event	Qualification		Final	
Athlete	Event	Distance	Position	Distance	Position
Xie Limei	Triple jump	14.27	10 q	14.09	12
Zheng Xingjuan	High jump	1.89	22	Did not advance	
Gao Shuying	Pole vault	4.50	=2 q	4.45	12
Li Ling^{1}	Pole vault	4.15	=27	Did not advance	
Zhou Yang	Pole vault	4.15	25	Did not advance	
Gong Lijiao	Shot put	19.46	2 Q	19.20	3rd place, bronze medalist(s)
Li Ling^{2}	Shot put	18.60	10 Q	17.94	14
Li Meiju	Shot put	19.18	3 Q	19.00	8
Li Yanfeng	Discus throw	61.29	10 q	60.68	7
Song Aimin	Discus throw	61.67	8 Q	62.20	3rd place, bronze medalist(s)
Ma Xuejun	Discus throw	58.45	23	Did not advance	
Chang Chunfeng	Javelin throw	58.42	18	Did not advance	
Song Dan	Javelin throw	54.32	42	Did not advance	
Zhang Li	Javelin throw	61.77	8 Q	56.14	10
Wang Zheng	Hammer throw	65.64	32	Did not advance	
Zhang Wenxiu	Hammer throw	73.36	2 Q	74.32	2nd place, silver medalist(s)

Combined events – Heptathlon

Athlete	Event	100H	HJ	SP	200 m	LJ	JT	800 m	Final	Rank
Liu Haili	Result	13.56	1.77	12.71	24.47	6.08	41.79	2:18.84	6041	20*
Liu Haili	Points	1041	941	708	936	874	702	839	6041	20*

* The athlete who finished in second place, Lyudmila Blonska of the Ukraine, tested positive for a banned substance. Both the A and the B tests were positive, therefore Blonska was stripped of her silver medal, and Liu Haili moved up a position.

== Badminton ==
Men

Athlete	Event	Round of 64	Round of 32	Round of 16	Quarterfinal	Semifinal	Final / BM	
Athlete	Event	Opposition Score	Opposition Score	Opposition Score	Opposition Score	Opposition Score	Opposition Score	Rank
Bao Chunlai	Singles	Bye	Cordón (GUA); W 21–17, 21–16	Wacha (POL); W 21–11, 19–21, 21–13	Lee H-i (KOR); L 21–23, 11–21	Did not advance		
Chen Jin	Singles	Bye	Moody (NZL); W 21–9, 21–11	Kehlhoffner (FRA); W 21–10, 21–6	Hsieh Y-h (TPE); W 21–8, 21–14	Lin D (CHN); L 12–21, 18–21	Lee H-i (KOR); W 21–16, 12–21, 21–14	3rd place, bronze medalist(s)
Lin Dan	Singles	Bye	Ng W (HKG); W 21–16, 21–13	Park S-h (KOR); W 21–8, 21–11	Gade (DEN); W 21–13, 21–16	Chen J (CHN); W 21–12, 21–18	Lee C W (MAS); W 21–12, 21–8	1st place, gold medalist(s)
Cai Yun; Fu Haifeng	Doubles	—N/a		Eriksen / Hansen (DEN); W 21–12, 21–11	Bach / Malaythong (USA); W 21–9, 21–10	Hwang J-m / Lee J-j (KOR); W 22–20, 21–8	Kido / Setiawan (INA); L 21–12, 11–21, 16–21	2nd place, silver medalist(s)
Guo Zhendong; Xie Zhongbo	Doubles	—N/a		Kido / Setiawan (INA); L 20–22, 21–10, 17–21	Did not advance			

Women

Athlete	Event	Round of 64	Round of 32	Round of 16	Quarterfinal	Semifinal	Final / BM	
Athlete	Event	Opposition Score	Opposition Score	Opposition Score	Opposition Score	Opposition Score	Opposition Score	Rank
Lu Lan	Singles	Bye	Foo Kune (MRI); W 21–1, 21–3	Rice (CAN); W 21–7, 21–12	Wong M C (MAS); W 21–7, 29–27	Xie Xf (CHN); L 21–7, 10–21, 12–21	Yulianti (INA); L 21–11, 13–21, 15–21	4
Xie Xingfang	Singles	Bye	Cheng S-c (TPE); W 21–1, 21–9	Konon (BLR); W 21–16, 21–15	Xu Hw (GER); W 21–19, 22–20	Lu L (CHN); W 7–21, 21–10, 21–12	Zhang N (CHN); L 12–21, 21–10, 18–21	2nd place, silver medalist(s)
Zhang Ning	Singles	Bye	Ponsana (THA); W 21–23, 21–17, 21–7	Jun J-y (KOR); W 21–11, 21–12	Pi (FRA); W 21–8, 19–21, 21–19	Yulianti (INA); W 21–15, 21–15	Xie Xf (CHN); W 21–12, 10–21, 21–18	1st place, gold medalist(s)
Du Jing; Yu Yang	Doubles	—N/a		Ha J-e / Kim M-j (KOR); W 21–11, 16–21, 21–15	Ogura / Shiota (JPN); W 21–8, 21–5	Wei Yl / Zhang Yw (CHN); W 21–19, 21–12	Lee H-j / Lee K-w (KOR); W 21–15, 21–13	1st place, gold medalist(s)
Wei Yili; Zhang Yawen	Doubles	—N/a		Kristiansen / Rytter Juhl (DEN); W 21–19, 21–13	Cheng W-h / Chien Y-c (TPE); W 21–14, 21–18	Du J / Yu Y (CHN); L 19–21, 12–21	Maeda / Suetsuna (JPN); W 21–17, 21–10	3rd place, bronze medalist(s)
Yang Wei; Zhang Jiewen	Doubles	—N/a		Marissa / Natsir (INA); W 21–19, 21–15	Maeda / Suetsuna (JPN); L 21–8, 21–23, 14–21	Did not advance		

Mixed

Athlete	Event	Round of 16	Quarterfinal	Semifinal	Final / BM	
Athlete	Event	Opposition Score	Opposition Score	Opposition Score	Opposition Score	Rank
He Hanbin; Yu Yang	Doubles	Clark / Kellogg (GBR); W 21–15, 21–8	Mateusiak / Kostiuczyk (POL); W 22–20, 23–21	Widianto / Natsir (INA); L 21–15, 11–21, 21–23	Limpele / Marissa (INA); W 19–21, 21–17, 23–21	3rd place, bronze medalist(s)
Zheng Bo; Gao Ling	Doubles	Robertson / Emms (GBR); L 16–21, 21–16, 19–21	Did not advance			

== Baseball ==
The China national baseball team secured automatic qualification as host nation of the Olympics and makes its first appearance at the Olympics. The team's coach is American Jim Lefebvre.

A team of 24 players competed.

Group stage

All times are China Standard Time (UTC+8)

Team	G	W	L	RS	RA	WIN%	GB	Tiebreaker
South Korea	7	7	0	41	22	1.000	-	-
Cuba	7	6	1	52	23	.857	1	-
United States	7	5	2	40	22	.714	2	-
Japan	7	4	3	30	14	.571	3	-
Chinese Taipei	7	2	5	29	33	.286	5	1-0
Canada	7	2	5	29	20	.286	5	0-1
Netherlands	7	1	6	9	50	.143	6	1-0
China	7	1	6	14	60	.143	6	0-1

Team	1	2	3	4	5	6	7	8	9	R	H	E
Canada	0	0	0	3	2	0	1	4	-	10	10	0
China	0	0	0	0	0	0	0	0	-	0	8	2
WP: Chris Begg (1-0) LP: Tao Bu (0-1); Home runs: CAN: Scott Thorman (1), Michael Saunders (1); CHN: None

Team	1	2	3	4	5	R	H	E
China	0	0	0	0	0	0	2	0
South Korea	0	0	0	0	0	0	3	0

Team	1	2	3	4	5	6	7	8	9	10	11	12	R	H	E
Chinese Taipei	0	0	0	0	1	1	0	0	1	0	0	4	7	11	1
China	0	0	0	0	0	0	0	3	0	0	0	5	8	11	3
WP: Jiangang Lu (1-0) LP: Chien-Fu Yang (0-1); Home runs: TPE: Kuo-Hui Lo (1); CHN: None

Team	1	2	3	4	5	6	7	8	9	R	H	E
Netherlands	0	0	0	1	5	0	0	0	0	6	9	1
China	0	0	1	0	1	0	0	1	1	4	11	1
WP: Leon Boyd (1-0) LP: Kai Liu (0-1) Sv: David Bergman (1); Home runs: NED: Sharnol Adriana (1), Sidney de Jong (1), Bryan Engelhardt (1); CHN: None

Team	6	7	8	9	10	11	R	H	E
China	-	0	0	0	0	0	0	4	2
South Korea	0	0	0	0	0	1	1	7	0
WP: Seung-Hwan Oh (1-0) LP: Jiangang Lv (1-1)

Team	1	2	3	4	5	6	7	8	9	R	H	E
China	0	0	0	0	0	0	0	0	1	1	4	1
United States	1	0	0	0	3	1	4	0	X	9	9	0
WP: Jake Arrieta (1-0) LP: Chenhao Li (0-1); Home runs: CHN: Yang Yang (1); USA: None

Team	1	2	3	4	5	6	7	8	9	R	H	E
China	0	0	0	0	0	0	0	-	-	0	2	0
Japan	0	3	1	0	0	6	X	-	-	10	10	0
WP: Hideaki Wakui (2-0) LP: Nan Wang (0-1); Home runs: CHN: None; JPN: Tsuyoshi Nishioka (1)

Team	1	2	3	4	5	6	7	8	9	R	H	E
China	0	0	0	0	0	0	1	-	-	1	2	1
Cuba	0	9	1	4	1	2	X	-	-	17	20	0
WP: Jonder Martínez (2-0) LP: Tao Bu (0-2); Home runs: CHN: None; CUB: Giorbis Duvergel (1), Michel Enríquez (1), Ariel Pestano (1)

== Basketball ==
=== Men's tournament ===
Roster

The following is the China roster in the men's basketball tournament of the 2008 Summer Olympics.

China men's national basketball team – 2008 Summer Olympics roster
Players
Coaches

Pos.	No.	Name	Age – Date of birth	Height	Club	Ctr.
PG	4	Chen Jianghua	19 – March 12, 1989	6 ft 2 in (1.88 m)	Guangdong Southern Tigers	(China)
G	5	Liu Wei (C)	28 – January 15, 1980	6 ft 3 in (1.91 m)	Shanghai Sharks	(China)
PG	6	Zhang Qingpeng	23 – January 23, 1985	6 ft 3 in (1.91 m)	Liaoning Hunters	(China)
G/F	7	Wang Shipeng	25 – April 6, 1983	6 ft 6 in (1.98 m)	Guangdong Southern Tigers	(China)
SF	8	Zhu Fangyu	25 – January 5, 1983	6 ft 7 in (2.01 m)	Guangdong Southern Tigers	(China)
G	9	Sun Yue	22 – November 6, 1985	6 ft 9 in (2.06 m)	Los Angeles Lakers	(United States)
SF	10	Li Nan	31 – September 25, 1976	6 ft 6 in (1.98 m)	Bayi Rockets	(China)
F/C	11	Yi Jianlian	20 – October 27, 1987	7 ft 0 in (2.13 m)	New Jersey Nets	(United States)
SF	12	Wang Lei	21 – August 12, 1986	6 ft 7 in (2.01 m)	Bayi Rockets	(China)
C	13	Yao Ming	27 – September 12, 1980	7 ft 6 in (2.29 m)	Houston Rockets	(United States)
C	14	Wang Zhizhi	29 – July 8, 1979	7 ft 1 in (2.16 m)	Bayi Rockets	(China)
F	15	Du Feng	27 – July 30, 1981	6 ft 9 in (2.06 m)	Guangdong Southern Tigers	(China)

Head coach

- (Lithuania) Jonas Kazlauskas

Assistant coach(es)

- (United States) Donnie Nelson

Legend

- (C) Team captain
- Club – describes last
  club before the tournament
- Age – describes age
  on August 9, 2008

Group play

Pos	Team	Pld	W	L	PF	PA	PD	Pts	Qualification
1	United States	5	5	0	515	354	+161	10	Quarterfinals
2	Spain	5	4	1	418	369	+49	9	Quarterfinals
3	Greece	5	3	2	415	375	+40	8	Quarterfinals
4	China (H)	5	2	3	366	400	−34	7	Quarterfinals
5	Germany	5	1	4	330	390	−60	6	
6	Angola	5	0	5	321	477	−156	5	

Source: FIBA archive
Rules for classification: 1) points; 2) head-to-head points; 3) head-to-head goal average; 4) head-to-head number of points scored.
(H) Hosts

10 August 2008
22:15

Report

United States	101–70	China
Scoring by quarter: 20–16, 29–21, 25–11, 27–22
Pts: Wade 19; Rebs: Bosh 8 Asts: Paul 6		Pts: Yao 13; Rebs: Yao 10; Asts: Chen, Liu, Zhu, Sun 2

Wukesong Indoor Stadium, Beijing
Attendance: 11,083
Referees: Carl Jungebrand (FIN)

12 August 2008
16:45

Report

China	75–85 (OT)	Spain
Scoring by quarter: 18–20, 28–17, 15–10, 11–25, Overtime: 3–13
Pts: Liu 19; Rebs: Yao, Yi 9 Asts: Yao, Sun 3		Pts: P. Gasol 29; Rebs: P. Gasol, Fernández 8 Asts: Fernández 6

Wukesong Indoor Stadium, Beijing
Attendance: 11,083
Referees: José Carrión (PUR)

14 August 2008
14:30

Report

Angola	68–85	China
Scoring by quarter: 15–28, 27–16, 9–21, 17–20
Pts: Gomes 17; Rebs: Mingas 5 Asts: Gomes 3		Pts: Yao 30; Rebs: Yi 11; Asts: Zhu, Li 3

Wukesong Indoor Stadium, Beijing
Attendance: 11,083
Referees: Carl Jungebrand (FIN)

16 August 2008
20:00

Report

China	59–55	Germany
Scoring by quarter: 19–9, 8–22, 20–8, 12–16
Pts: Yao 25; Rebs: Yao, Yi 11; Asts: Liu 3		Pts: Nowitzki 24; Rebs: Nowitzki 17; Asts: Hamann, Garrett 2

Wukesong Indoor Stadium, Beijing
Attendance: 11,083
Referees: Eddie Rush (USA)

18 August 2008
14:30

Report

Greece	91–77	China
Scoring by quarter: 27–15, 19–9, 23–30, 22–23
Pts: Bourousis, Spanoulis 19; Rebs: Bourousis 19; Asts: Papaloukas, Spanoulis 5		Pts: Yao 16; Rebs: Wang 8 Asts: Sun 6

Wukesong Indoor Stadium, Beijing
Attendance: 11,083
Referees: Cristiano Maranho (BRA)

Quarterfinals

20 August 2008
16:45

Report

Lithuania	94–68	China
Scoring by quarter: 19–17, 22–13, 29–23, 24–15
Scoring by half: 41–30, 53–38
Pts: Jasikevičius 23; Rebs: Kleiza 7 Asts: Jasikevičius 6		Pts: Yao 19; Rebs: Yi 9 Asts: Yao 3

Wukesong Indoor Stadium, Beijing
Attendance: 11,083
Referees: Nikolaos Pitsilkas (GRE)

=== Women's tournament ===
Roster

The following is the China roster in the women's basketball tournament of the 2008 Summer Olympics.

China women's national basketball team – 2008 Summer Olympics roster
Players
Coaches

Pos.	No.	Name	Age – Date of birth	Height	Club	Ctr.
G	4	Song Xiaoyun	25 – December 11, 1982	5 ft 9 in (1.75 m)	WCBA Guangdong	(China)
F	5	Bian Lan	21 – August 16, 1986	6 ft 1 in (1.85 m)	WCBA Jiangsu	(China)
G	6	Zhang Hanlan	29 – July 19, 1979	5 ft 9 in (1.75 m)	WCBA Shenbu	(China)
F	7	Zhang Wei	22 – February 12, 1986	6 ft 0 in (1.83 m)	WCBA Liaoning	(China)
F	8	Miao Lijie (C)	27 – June 3, 1981	5 ft 10 in (1.78 m)	WCBA Heilongjiang	(China)
F	9	Zhang Yu	22 – February 12, 1986	6 ft 0 in (1.83 m)	WCBA Liaoning	(China)
F	10	Sui Feifei	29 – January 29, 1979	6 ft 0 in (1.83 m)	WCBA Bayi	(China)
G	11	Shao Tingting	23 – February 9, 1985	5 ft 9 in (1.75 m)	WCBA Bayi	(China)
C	12	Chen Xiaoli	26 – February 20, 1982	6 ft 4 in (1.93 m)	WCBA Liaoning	(China)
F	13	Liu Dan	21 – April 24, 1987	6 ft 4 in (1.93 m)	WCBA Shenbu	(China)
C	14	Zhang Xiaoni	24 – October 29, 1983	6 ft 4 in (1.93 m)	WCBA Bayi	(China)
C	15	Chen Nan	25 – January 8, 1983	6 ft 5 in (1.96 m)	WCBA Bayi	(China)

Head coach

- (Australia) Tom Maher

Legend

- (C) Team captain
- Club – describes last
  club before the tournament
- Age – describes age
  on August 9, 2008

Group play

Pos	Team	Pld	W	L	PF	PA	PD	Pts	Qualification
1	United States	5	5	0	491	276	+215	10	Quarterfinals
2	China (H)	5	4	1	358	346	+12	9	Quarterfinals
3	Spain	5	3	2	357	324	+33	8	Quarterfinals
4	Czech Republic	5	2	3	346	356	−10	7	Quarterfinals
5	New Zealand	5	1	4	320	423	−103	6	
6	Mali	5	0	5	255	402	−147	5	

Source: FIBA archive
Rules for classification: 1) points; 2) head-to-head points; 3) head-to-head points difference; 4) head-to-head number of points scored.
(H) Hosts

9 August 2008
14:30

Report

China	67–64	Spain
Scoring by quarter: 18–15, 19–9, 15–20, 15–20
Pts: Bian 15; Rebs: Bian 12; Asts: Miao 3		Pts: Torrens 18; Rebs: Montañana 7 Asts: Palau 4

Wukesong Indoor Stadium, Beijing
Attendance: 11,083
Referees: Jose Carrion (PUR)

11 August 2008
20:00

Report

China	63–108	United States
Scoring by quarter: 11–33, 16–28, 19–20, 17–27
Pts: Miao 16; Rebs: Bian, Liu, Sui 4 Asts: Miao, Shao 3		Pts: Thompson 27; Rebs: Leslie 10; Asts: Lawson, Pondexter 5

Wukesong Indoor Stadium, Beijing
Attendance: 11,083
Referees: Romualdas Brazauskas (LTU)

13 August 2008
16:45

Report

China	80–63	New Zealand
Scoring by quarter: 26–18, 24–13, 15–17, 15–15
Pts: Chen 26; Rebs: Chen 17; Asts: Miao 6		Pts: Harmon, Marino 14; Rebs: Harmon 8 Asts: Bates 4

Wukesong Indoor Stadium, Beijing
Attendance: 11,083
Referees: Yuji Hirahara (JPN)

15 August 2008
16:45

Report

China	69–48	Mali
Scoring by quarter: 17–7, 20–13, 15–15, 17–13
Pts: Miao 25; Rebs: Chen 9 Asts: Sui 5		Pts: Diawara, Sininta 11; Rebs: Sissoko 19; Asts: Diawara, Sininta 1

Wukesong Indoor Stadium, Beijing
Attendance: 11,083
Referees: Reynaldo Mercedes (DOM)

17 August 2008
20:00

Report

China	79–63	Czech Republic
Scoring by quarter: 24–11, 17–14, 24–20, 14–18
Pts: Miao 21; Rebs: Bian 9 Asts: Chen 3		Pts: Hartigova 15; Rebs: Veselá, Vecerova 8 Asts: Veselá, Machová 3

Wukesong Indoor Stadium, Beijing
Attendance: 11,083
Referees: Stephen Seibel (CAN)

Quarterfinals

19 August 2008
14:30

Report

China	77–62	Belarus
Scoring by quarter: 19–13, 19–12, 18–18, 21–19
Pts: Miao 28; Rebs: Song, Chen, Sui 4 Asts: Miao 3		Pts: Troina 15; Rebs: Leuchanka 13; Asts: Padabed, Marchanka 5

Wukesong Indoor Stadium, Beijing
Attendance: 11,083
Referees: Fabio Facchini (ITA)

Semifinals

21 August 2008
22:15

Report

China	56–90	Australia
Scoring by quarter: 11–13, 7–21, 21–23, 17–33
Pts: Bian 20; Rebs: Liu, Sui 7 Asts: Bian 2		Pts: Snell 16; Rebs: Batkovic 13; Asts: Harrower, Snell 4

Wukesong Indoor Stadium, Beijing
Attendance: 11,083
Referees: Chantal Julien (FRA)

Bronze medal match

23 August 2008
19:30

Report

(bronze) Russia	94–81	China
Scoring by quarter: 24–23, 28–16, 20–18, 22–24
Pts: Hammon 22; Rebs: Stepanova 9 Asts: Karpunina 5		Pts: Chen 26; Rebs: Bian, Sui 6 Asts: Song 7

Wukesong Indoor Stadium, Beijing
Attendance: 11,083
Referees: Scott Butler (AUS)

== Boxing ==
China qualified ten boxers for the Olympic boxing tournament, far surpassing its guaranteed quota of at least six spots. The flyweight class was the only in which China did not qualify a boxer. Seven of the ten Chinese qualifiers did so at the world championships. Hu, Maimaitituersun and Zhang Xiaoping qualified at the first Asian continental qualifying tournament.

Athlete	Event	Round of 32	Round of 16	Quarterfinals	Semifinals	Final	
Athlete	Event	Opposition Result	Opposition Result	Opposition Result	Opposition Result	Opposition Result	Rank
Zou Shiming	Light flyweight	Bermúdez (VEN); W 15–2	Oubaali (FRA); W 3^{+}–3	Zhakypov (KAZ); W 9–4	Barnes (IRL); W 15–0	Serdamba (MGL); W RET	1st place, gold medalist(s)
Gu Yu	Bantamweight	Murray (GBR); W 17–7	Gojan (MDA); L 6–13	Did not advance			
Li Yang	Featherweight	Conceiçao (BRA); W 12–4	Porozo (ECU); W 6–5	Lomachenko (UKR); L 3–13	Did not advance		
Hu Qing	Lightweight	Klyuchko (UKR); W 10–8	Akshalov (KAZ); W 11–7	Sow (FRA); L 6–9	Did not advance		
Maimaitituersun Qiong	Light welterweight	Kovalev (RUS); L 8–15	Did not advance				
Hanati Silamu	Welterweight	Makina (ZAM); W 21–2	Mulema (CMR); W 9–4	Johnson (BAH); W 14–4	Banteaux (CUB); L 4–7	Did not advance	3rd place, bronze medalist(s)
Wang Jianzheng	Middleweight	Derevyanchenko (UKR); L 6–16	Did not advance				
Zhang Xiaoping	Light heavyweight	Sahraoui (TUN); W 3–1	Beterbiyev (RUS); W 8–2	Benchabla (ALG); W 12–7	Shynaliyev (KAZ); W 3^{+}–3	Egan (IRL); W 11–7	1st place, gold medalist(s)
Yushan Nijiati	Heavyweight	—N/a	Usyk (UKR); L 4–23	Did not advance			
Zhang Zhilei	Super heavyweight	—N/a	Amanissi (MAR); W 15–0	Myrsatayev (KAZ); W 12–2	Glazkov (UKR); W WO	Cammarelle (ITA); L 4–14	2nd place, silver medalist(s)

== Canoeing ==
=== Slalom ===
Athlete	Event	Preliminary						Semifinal		Final			
Athlete	Event	Run 1	Rank	Run 2	Rank	Total	Rank	Time	Rank	Time	Rank	Total	Rank
Ding Fuxue	Men's K-1	87.47	15	140.92	21	228.39	21	Did not advance					
Feng Liming	Men's C-1	91.44	9	90.55	12	181.99	11 Q	94.64	11	Did not advance			
Hu Minghai; Shu Junrong	Men's C-2	97.30	5	93.34	3	190.64	3 Q	164.08	10	Did not advance			
Li Jingjing	Women's K-1	94.30	3	93.26	4	187.56	2 Q	161.79	13	Did not advance			

=== Sprint ===
Men

Athlete	Event	Heats		Semifinals		Final	
Athlete	Event	Time	Rank	Time	Rank	Time	Rank
Li Qiang	C-1 500 m	1:49.164	2 QS	1:52.887	3 Q	1:49.287	6
Pan Yao	K-1 500 m	1:44.757	6 QS	1:55.242	8	Did not advance	
Pan Yao	K-1 1000 m	3:40.774	5 QS	3:41.539	6	Did not advance	
Chen Zhongyun; Zhang Zhiwu	C-2 1000 m	3:41.658	4 QS	3:42.619	3 Q	3:40.593	5
Huang Zhipeng; Shen Jie	K-2 500 m	1:34.432	8	Did not advance			
Huang Zhipeng; Shen Jie	K-2 1000 m	3:26.443	5 QS	3:24.031	3 Q	3:22.058	8
Meng Guanliang; Yang Wenjun	C-2 500 m	1:41.218	1 QF	Bye		1:41.025	1st place, gold medalist(s)
Li Zhen; Lin Miao; Liu Haitao; Zhou Peng	K-4 1000 m	2:59.271	4 QS	3:01.787	2 Q	3:00.078	7

Women

Athlete	Event	Heats		Semifinals		Final	
Athlete	Event	Time	Rank	Time	Rank	Time	Rank
Zhong Hongyan	K-1 500 m	1:49.440	2 QS	1:53.163	1 Q	1:52.220	5
Wang Feng; Xu Linbei	K-2 500 m	1:47.645	8	Did not advance			
Liang Peixing; Xu Yaping; Yu Lamei; Zhong Hongyan	K-4 500 m	1:36.971	2 QF	Bye		1:37.418	9

Qualification Legend: QS = Qualify to semi-final; QF = Qualify directly to final

== Cycling ==
=== Road ===
Athlete	Event	Time	Rank
Zhang Liang	Men's road race	Did not finish	
Gao Min	Women's road race	3:32:52	16
Gao Min	Women's time trial	37:15.23	17
Meng Lang	Women's road race	3:37:42	48
Meng Lang	Women's time trial	40:51.61	25

=== Track ===
Sprint

Athlete	Event	Qualification		Round 1	Round 2	Quarterfinals	Semifinals	Final	
Athlete	Event	Time Speed (km/h)	Rank	Opposition Time Speed (km/h)	Opposition Time Speed (km/h)	Opposition Time Speed (km/h)	Opposition Time Speed (km/h)	Opposition Time Speed (km/h)	Rank
Zhang Lei	Men's sprint	10.497; 68.591	16	Nimke (GER); L	Watanabe (JPN); Blatchford (USA); L	Did not advance			
Feng Yong; Li Wenhao; Zhang Lei	Men's team sprint	45.556; 59.267	9	Did not advance					
Guo Shuang	Women's sprint	11.106; 64.829	2	Grankovskaya (RUS); W 11.410; 63.102	—N/a	Tsylinskaya (BLR); W 11.501, W 11.627	Meares (AUS); W 11.629, L, L REL	Kanis (NED); W 11.420, W 11.617	3rd place, bronze medalist(s)

Keirin

Athlete	Event	1st round	Repechage	2nd round	Finals
Athlete	Event	Rank	Rank	Rank	Rank
Feng Yong	Men's keirin	6 R	3	Did not advance	

Omnium

Athlete	Event	Points	Laps	Rank
Li Yan	Women's points race	6	0	10

=== Mountain biking ===
Athlete	Event	Time	Rank
Ji Jianhua	Men's cross-country	1:57:31	22
Liu Ying	Women's cross-country	1:52:01	12
Ren Chengyuan	Women's cross-country	1:47:40	5

=== BMX ===
Athlete	Event	Seeding		Semifinals		Final	
Athlete	Event	Result	Rank	Points	Rank	Result	Rank
Ma Liyun	Women's BMX	42.015	16	18	7	Did not advance	

== Diving ==
Men

Athlete	Events	Preliminaries		Semifinals		Final	
Athlete	Events	Points	Rank	Points	Rank	Points	Rank
He Chong	3 m springboard	515.50	1 Q	547.25	1 Q	572.90	1st place, gold medalist(s)
Qin Kai	3 m springboard	502.95	2 Q	508.50	2 Q	530.10	3rd place, bronze medalist(s)
Huo Liang	10 m platform	472.95	8 Q	549.95	1 Q	508.40	4
Zhou Lüxin	10 m platform	539.80	1 Q	526.20	3 Q	533.15	2nd place, silver medalist(s)
Qin Kai; Wang Feng	3 m synchronized springboard	—N/a				469.08	1st place, gold medalist(s)
Huo Liang; Lin Yue	10 m synchronized platform	—N/a				468.18	1st place, gold medalist(s)

Women

Athlete	Events	Preliminaries		Semifinals		Final	
Athlete	Events	Points	Rank	Points	Rank	Points	Rank
Guo Jingjing	3 m springboard	373.90	1 Q	398.55	1 Q	415.35	1st place, gold medalist(s)
Wu Minxia	3 m springboard	349.45	4 Q	345.30	3 Q	389.85	3rd place, bronze medalist(s)
Chen Ruolin	10 m platform	428.80	1 Q	444.60	1 Q	447.70	1st place, gold medalist(s)
Wang Xin	10 m platform	420.30	3 Q	388.55	3 Q	429.90	3rd place, bronze medalist(s)
Guo Jingjing; Wu Minxia	3 m synchronized springboard	—N/a				343.50	1st place, gold medalist(s)
Chen Ruolin; Wang Xin	10 m synchronized platform	—N/a				363.54	1st place, gold medalist(s)

== Equestrian ==
=== Dressage ===
Athlete	Horse	Event	Grand Prix		Grand Prix Special		Grand Prix Freestyle		Overall	
Athlete	Horse	Event	Score	Rank	Score	Rank	Score	Rank	Score	Rank
Liu Lina	Piroschka	Individual	60.625	43	Did not advance					

=== Eventing ===
Athlete	Horse	Event	Dressage		Cross-country			Jumping						Total	
Athlete	Horse	Event	Dressage		Cross-country			Qualifier			Final			Total	
Athlete	Horse	Event	Penalties	Rank	Penalties	Total	Rank	Penalties	Total	Rank	Penalties	Total	Rank	Penalties	Rank
Alex Hua Tian	Chico	Individual	49.60	31	Eliminated			Did not advance							

=== Show jumping ===
Athlete	Horse	Event	Qualification								Final					Total	
Athlete	Horse	Event	Round 1		Round 2			Round 3			Round A		Round B			Total	
Athlete	Horse	Event	Penalties	Rank	Penalties	Total	Rank	Penalties	Total	Rank	Penalties	Rank	Penalties	Total	Rank	Penalties	Rank
Huang Zuping	Pablo II	Individual	10	56	36	46	66	Did not advance									
Li Zhenqiang	Jumpy Des Fontaines	Individual	9	52	39	48	67	Did not advance									
Zhang Bin	Coertis	Individual	30	74	31	61	69	Did not advance									
Zhao Zhiwen	Tadonia	Individual	17	69	32	49	68	Did not advance									
Huang Zuping; Li Zhenqiang; Zhang Bin; Zhao Zhiwen	See above	Team	—N/a								99	16	Did not advance			99	15

== Fencing ==
Men

Athlete	Event	Round of 64	Round of 32	Round of 16	Quarterfinal	Semifinal	Final / BM	
Athlete	Event	Opposition Score	Opposition Score	Opposition Score	Opposition Score	Opposition Score	Opposition Score	Rank
Li Guojie	Individual épée	Wiercioch (POL); W 15–11	Jin S-J (KOR); L 6–15	Did not advance				
Wang Lei	Individual épée	Bye	Verwijlen (NED); L 10–15	Did not advance				
Yin Lianchi	Individual épée	Bye	Kulcsar (HUN); W 15–9	Zawrotniak (POL); L 13–15	Did not advance			
Dong Guotao; Li Guojie; Wang Lei; Yin Lianchi	Team épée	—N/a		South Africa; W 45–28	Hungary; W 45–43	Poland; L 44–45	Italy; L 35–45	4
Lei Sheng	Individual foil	—N/a	Bye	Mocek (POL); W 15–8	Kleibrink (GER); L 7–15	Did not advance		
Zhu Jun	Individual foil	—N/a	González (ARG); W 15–2	Meinhardt (USA); W 15–9	Cassarà (ITA); W 15–14	Kleibrink (GER); L 4–15	Sanzo (ITA); L 14–15	4
Wang Jingzhi	Individual sabre	Bye	Pillet (FRA); L 14–15	Did not advance				
Zhong Man	Individual sabre	Bye	Kothny (THA); W 15–7	Martí (ESP); W 15–14	Tarantino (ITA); W 15–13	Pillet (FRA); W 15–12	Lopez (FRA); W 15–9	1st place, gold medalist(s)
Zhou Hanming	Individual sabre	Bye	Nemcsik (HUN); W 15–13	Covaliu (ROU); L 12–15	Did not advance			
Huang Yaojiang; Wang Jingzhi; Zhong Man; Zhou Hanming	Team sabre	—N/a			Russia; L 36–45	Classification semi-final Hungary; W 45–38	5th place final Belarus; L 39–45	6

Women

Athlete	Event	Round of 64	Round of 32	Round of 16	Quarterfinal	Semifinal	Final / BM	
Athlete	Event	Opposition Score	Opposition Score	Opposition Score	Opposition Score	Opposition Score	Opposition Score	Rank
Li Na	Individual épée	—N/a	Bye	Lamon (SUI); W 15–10	Flessel-Colovic (FRA); W 15–10	Heidemann (GER); L 13–15	Mincza-Nébald (HUN); L 11–15	4
Zhong Weiping	Individual épée	—N/a	Flessel-Colovic (FRA); L 11–13	Did not advance				
Su Wanwen	Individual foil	Nogueira (POR); W 15–4	Cross (USA); W 15–7	Knapek (HUN); L 10–15	Did not advance			
Sun Chao	Individual foil	Bye	Knapek (HUN); L 13–15	Did not advance				
Zhang Lei	Individual foil	Bye	Wojtkowiak (POL); W 15–8	Vezzali (ITA); L 7–10	Did not advance			
Huang Jialing; Su Wanwen; Sun Chao; Zhang Lei	Team foil	—N/a			Italy; L 24–37	Classification semi-final Egypt; W 45–24	5th place final Germany; W 28–34	6
Bao Yingying	Individual sabre	Bye	Chow T K (HKG); W 15–5	Więckowska (POL); W 15–6	Zagunis (USA); L 9–15	Did not advance		
Huang Haiyang	Individual sabre	Bye	Bianco (ITA); L 12–15	Did not advance				
Tan Xue	Individual sabre	Bye	Bujdoso (GER); W 15–6	Kim K-H (KOR); W 15–8	Velikaya (RUS); L 9–15	Did not advance		
Bao Yingying; Huang Haiyang; Ni Hong; Tan Xue	Team sabre	—N/a			Poland; W 45–25	France; W 45–38	Ukraine; L 44–45	2nd place, silver medalist(s)

== Field hockey ==
=== Men's tournament ===
China's men's team competed in Pool A. Sixteen players were officially enrolled in the squad. Two reserve players were also nominated to be available should a player enrolled in the official squad become injured during the tournament.

Roster

The following is the Chinese roster in the men's field hockey tournament of the 2008 Summer Olympics.

Head Coach: Kim Sang-Ryul

1. Sun Tianjun
6. Luo Fangming
7. De Yunze
8. Jiang Xishang
9. Song Yi (c)
10. Li Wei
12. Meng Xuguang
15. Liu Xiantang
16. Meng Lizhi
17. Hu Liang
18. Meng Jun
19. Yu Yang
20. Na Yubo
25. Su Rifeng (GK)
27. Tao Zhinan (GK)
32. Hu Huiren

Reserve:

11. Lu Fenghui
29. Ao Changrong

Group play

Pos	Team	Pld	W	D	L	GF	GA	GD	Pts	Qualification
1	Spain	5	4	0	1	9	5	+4	12	Semi-finals
2	Germany	5	3	2	0	12	6	+6	11	Semi-finals
3	South Korea	5	2	1	2	13	11	+2	7	Fifth place game
4	New Zealand	5	2	1	2	10	9	+1	7	Seventh place game
5	Belgium	5	1	1	3	9	13	−4	4	Ninth place game
6	China (H)	5	0	1	4	7	16	−9	1	Eleventh place game

(H) Hosts

11 August 2008
08:30

Germany	4–1	China
C. Zeller 21'; Keller 43', 54'; Nevado 68'	Report	Na Yubo 7'

Umpires:
David Leiper (GBR)
Satinder Kumar (IND)

13 August 2008
10:30

China	2–5	South Korea
Na Yubo 6'; Song Yi 8'	Report	Seo Jong-ho 13'; Jang Jong-hyun 35+', 55', 57'; Kang Seong-jung 67'

Umpires:
Amarjit Singh (MAS)
Henrik Ehlers (DEN)

15 August 2008
08:30

Spain	2–1	China
Ribas 17'; Amat 67'	Report	Na Yubo 6'

Umpires:
David Gentles (AUS)
Kim Hong-lae (KOR)

17 August 2008
18:30

New Zealand	2–2	China
Child 34'; McAleese 54'	Report	Song Yi 3', 17'

Umpires:
Murray Grime (AUS)
Andy Mair (GBR)

19 August 2008
21:00

China	1–3	Belgium
Song Yi 4'	Report	Reckinger 28'; Truyens 32'; Dohmen 48'

Umpires:
Murray Grime (AUS)
Gary Simmonds (RSA)

11th–12th place

23 August 2008
08:30

China	4–3 (a.e.t.)	South Africa
Na Yubo 32'; Song Yi 53', 58', 85'	Report	Tsolekile 3'; Symons 63'; Smith 70'

Umpires:
Rob ten Cate (NED)
Satinder Kumar (IND)

=== Women's tournament ===
China's women's team competed in Pool A. Sixteen players were officially enrolled in the squad. Two reserve players were also nominated to be available should a player enrolled in the official squad become injured during the tournament.

Roster

The following is the Chinese roster in the women's field hockey tournament of the 2008 Summer Olympics.

Head Coach: Kim Chang-Back

1. Ma Yibo (c)
3. Chen Zhaoxia
5. Cheng Hui
7. Huang Junxia
8. Fu Baorong
9. Li Shuang
10. Gao Lihua
11. Tang Chunling
12. Zhou Wanfeng
16. Zhang Yimeng (GK)
17. Li Hongxia
18. Ren Ye
19. Chen Qiuqi
21. Zhao Yudiao
22. Song Qingling
31. Pan Fengzhen (GK)

Reserve:

13. Sun Zhen
23. Li Aili

Group play

Team	Pld	W	D	L	GF	GA	GD	Pts	Qualification
Netherlands	5	5	0	0	14	3	+11	15	Advanced to semifinals
China	5	3	1	1	14	4	+10	10	Advanced to semifinals
Australia	5	3	1	1	17	9	+8	10	
Spain	5	2	0	3	4	12	−8	6	
South Korea	5	1	0	4	13	18	−5	3	
South Africa	5	0	0	5	2	18	−16	0	

10 August 2008
10:30

China	3–0	Spain
Fu Baorong 17'; Li Hongxia 31'; Gao Lihua 37'	Report

Umpires:
Ute Conen (GER)
Marelize de Clerk (RSA)

12 August 2008
18:30

China	3–0	South Africa
Tang Chunling 6'; Fu Baorong 33'; Zhao Yudiao 40'	Report

Umpires:
Gina Spitaleri (ITA)
Minka Woolley (AUS)

14 August 2008
08:30

China	0–1	Netherlands
	Report	Paumen 21'

Umpires:
Chieko Soma (JPN)
Soledad Iparruguirre (ARG)

16 August 2008
18:30

South Korea	1–6	China
Lee Seon-ok 53'	Report	Tang Chunling 30', 33', 41'; Fu Baorong 39', 40', 64'

Umpires:
Julie Ashton-Lucy (AUS)
Carolina de la Fuente (ARG)

18 August 2008
21:00

China	2–2	Australia
Li Hongxia 30', 38'	Report	Eastham 51'; Young 62'

Umpires:
Chieko Soma (JPN)
Carolina de la Fuente (ARG)

Semifinal

20 August 2008
18:00

Germany	2–3	China
Keller 4'; Beermann 36'	Report	Gao Lihua 31'; Ma Yibo 39'; Zhao Yudiao 58'

Umpires:
Carolina de la Fuente (ARG)
Julie Ashton-Lucy (AUS)

Gold medal match

22 August 2008
20:30

(silver) China	0–2	Netherlands (gold)
	Report	Van As 51'; Goderie 62'

Umpires:
Soledad Iparraguirre (ARG)
Carolina de la Fuente (ARG)

== Football ==
=== Men's tournament ===
A squad of 18 players, 15 of which must have been born on or after 1 January 1985, and 3 of which can be older dispensation players, was selected to represent China at the Games. A minimum of two goalkeepers (plus one optional dispensation goalkeeper) had to be included in the squad.

Roster

The following is the China squad in the men's football tournament of the 2008 Summer Olympics.

Head coach: Yin Tiesheng

No.	Pos.	Player	Date of birth (age)	Caps	Goals	Club
1	GK	Qiu Shengjiong	1 September 1985 (aged 22)	6	0	(Chinese Football Association) Shanghai Shenhua
2	DF	Tan Wangsong	19 December 1985 (aged 22)	14	2	(Chinese Football Association) Tianjin Teda
3	DF	Feng Xiaoting	22 October 1985 (aged 22)	20	5	(Chinese Football Association) Dalian Shide
4	DF	Yuan Weiwei	25 November 1985 (aged 22)	16	2	(Chinese Football Association) Shandong Luneng
5	DF	Li Weifeng*	1 December 1978 (aged 29)	106	15	(Chinese Football Association) Shanghai Shenhua
6	MF	Zhou Haibin	19 July 1985 (aged 23)	41	8	(Chinese Football Association) Shandong Luneng
7	FW	Hao Junmin	24 March 1987 (aged 21)	15	3	(Chinese Football Association) Tianjin Teda
8	MF	Zheng Zhi* (c)	20 August 1980 (aged 27)	78	23	(The Football Association) Charlton Athletic
9	FW	Gao Lin	14 February 1986 (aged 22)	16	5	(Chinese Football Association) Shanghai Shenhua
10	FW	Han Peng*	13 September 1983 (aged 24)	23	6	(Chinese Football Association) Shandong Luneng
11	MF	Chen Tao	11 March 1985 (aged 23)	31	11	(Chinese Football Association) Changsha Ginde
12	MF	Cui Peng	31 May 1987 (aged 21)	13	1	(Chinese Football Association) Shandong Luneng
13	MF	Shen Longyuan	2 March 1985 (aged 23)	14	2	(Chinese Football Association) Shanghai Shenhua
14	DF	Wan Houliang	25 February 1986 (aged 22)	6	0	(Chinese Football Association) Shaanxi Chanba
15	FW	Jiang Ning	1 September 1986 (aged 21)	11	4	(Chinese Football Association) Qingdao Jonoon
16	MF	Zhao Xuri	3 December 1985 (aged 22)	19	5	(Chinese Football Association) Dalian Shide
17	FW	Dong Fangzhuo	23 January 1985 (aged 23)	26	3	(The Football Association) Manchester United
18	GK	Liu Zhenli	26 June 1985 (aged 23)	4	0	(Chinese Football Association) Qingdao Jonoon
20	FW	Zhu Ting (Note: Replaces Chen Tao who was injured during the competition)	15 July 1985 (aged 23)	21	3	(Chinese Football Association) Dalian Shide

* Over-aged player.

Notes

Group play

Pos	Team	Pld	W	D	L	GF	GA	GD	Pts	Qualification
1	Brazil	3	3	0	0	9	0	+9	9	Qualified for the quarterfinals
2	Belgium	3	2	0	1	3	1	+2	6	Qualified for the quarterfinals
3	China (H)	3	0	1	2	1	6	−5	1	
4	New Zealand	3	0	1	2	1	7	−6	1	

(H) Hosts
7 August 2008
19:45

China	1–1	New Zealand
Dong Fangzhuo 88'	Report	Brockie 53'

Shenyang Olympic Stadium, Shenyang
Attendance: 41,407
Referee: Martín Vázquez (Uruguay)
10 August 2008
19:45

Belgium	2–0	China
Dembélé 8'; Mirallas 80'	Report

Shenyang Olympic Stadium, Shenyang
Attendance: 45,756
Referee: Héctor Baldassi (Argentina)
13 August 2008
19:45

China	0–3	Brazil
	Report	Diego 18'; Thiago Neves 69', 73'

Qinhuangdao Olympic Sports Center Stadium, Qinhuangdao
Attendance: 38,790
Referee: Jerome Damon (South Africa)

=== Women's tournament ===
A squad of 18 players competed for China in the women's competition.

Roster

Head coach: Shang Ruihua

China PR named a squad of 18 players and 4 alternates for the tournament.

No.	Pos.	Player	Date of birth (age)	Caps	Goals	Club
1	GK	Zhang Yanru	10 January 1987 (aged 21)	35	0	(Chinese Football Association) Jiangsu Huatai
2	DF	Yuan Fan	6 November 1986 (aged 21)	31	0	(Chinese Football Association) Shanghai Shenhua
3	DF	Li Jie (captain)	8 July 1979 (aged 29)	196	12	(Chinese Football Association) Beijing Zhaotai
4	DF	Zhang Ying	27 June 1985 (aged 23)	85	4	(Chinese Football Association) Shanghai Shenhua
5	DF	Weng Xinzhi	15 June 1988 (aged 20)	30	0	(Chinese Football Association) Jiangsu Huatai
6	MF	Zhang Na	10 March 1984 (aged 24)	30	1	(Chinese Football Association) Hebei Huabei
7	MF	Bi Yan	17 February 1984 (aged 24)	140	12	(Chinese Football Association) Dalian Haichang
8	FW	Xu Yuan	17 November 1985 (aged 22)	25	6	(Chinese Football Association) Gansu Tianma
9	FW	Han Duan	15 June 1983 (aged 25)	160	100	(Chinese Football Association) Dalian Haichang
10	FW	Liu Sa	11 July 1987 (aged 21)	25	4	(Chinese Football Association) Beijing Zhaotai
11	DF	Pu Wei	20 August 1980 (aged 27)	200	35	(Chinese Football Association) Shanghai Shenhua
12	MF	Lou Jiahui	26 May 1991 (aged 17)	0	0	(Chinese Football Association) Henan Jianye
13	DF	Jiang Shuai	7 June 1982 (aged 26)	15	1	(Chinese Football Association) Tianjin Huisen
14	DF	Liu Huana	17 May 1981 (aged 27)	50	2	(Chinese Football Association) Shaanxi Guoli
15	DF	Zhou Gaoping	20 October 1986 (aged 21)	28	0	(Chinese Football Association) Jiangsu Huatai
16	MF	Wang Dandan	1 May 1985 (aged 23)	25	4	(Chinese Football Association) Beijing Chengjiang
17	MF	Gu Yasha	28 November 1990 (aged 17)	0	0	(Chinese Football Association) Beijing Chengjiang
18	GK	Han Wenxia	23 August 1976 (aged 31)	93	0	(Chinese Football Association) Dalian Haichang

Group play

Pos	Team	Pld	W	D	L	GF	GA	GD	Pts	Qualification
1	China	3	2	1	0	5	2	+3	7	Qualified for the quarterfinals
2	Sweden	3	2	0	1	4	3	+1	6	Qualified for the quarterfinals
3	Canada	3	1	1	1	4	4	0	4	Qualified for the quarterfinals
4	Argentina	3	0	0	3	1	5	−4	0	

6 August 2008
19:45

China	2–1	Sweden
Xu Yuan 6'; Han Duan 72'	Report	Schelin 38'

Tianjin Olympic Center Stadium, Tianjin
Attendance: 37,902
Referee: Hong Eun-ah (Korea Republic)
9 August 2008
19:45

Canada	1–1	China
Sinclair 34'	Report	Xu Yuan 36'

Tianjin Olympic Center Stadium, Tianjin
Attendance: 52,600
Referee: Dagmar Damková (Czech Republic)
12 August 2008
19:45

China	2–0	Argentina
Quiñones 52' (o.g.); Gu Yasha 90'	Report

Qinhuangdao Olympic Sports Center Stadium, Qinhuangdao
Attendance: 31,492
Referee: Nicole Petignat (Switzerland)

Quarterfinals

15 August 2008
21:00

China	0–2	Japan
	Report	Sawa 15'; Nagasato 80'

Qinhuangdao Olympic Sports Center Stadium, Qinhuangdao
Attendance: 28,459
Referee: Christine Beck (Germany)

== Gymnastics ==
=== Artistic ===
Men
Team

Athlete	Event	Qualification								Final							
Athlete	Event	Apparatus						Total	Rank	Apparatus						Total	Rank
Athlete	Event	F	PH	R	V	PB	HB	Total	Rank	F	PH	R	V	PB	HB	Total	Rank
Chen Yibing	Team	14.725	14.475	16.525 Q	16.275	15.075	14.525	91.600	9 Q	14.575	—N/a	16.575	15.950	—N/a			
Huang Xu	Team	—N/a	15.300	15.300	—N/a	16.075 Q	—N/a			—N/a	14.750	16.000	—N/a	16.475	—N/a		
Li Xiaopeng	Team	15.100	—N/a	14.800	16.775	16.425 Q	15.400	—N/a		—N/a			16.775	16.450	15.725	—N/a	
Xiao Qin	Team	14.375	16.000 Q	—N/a	15.725	15.450	15.150	—N/a		—N/a	16.100	—N/a			15.250	—N/a	
Yang Wei	Team	15.400	15.425 Q	16.225 Q	16.550	15.350	14.925	93.875	1 Q	15.425	15.175	16.300	16.600	16.100	—N/a		
Zou Kai	Team	15.700 Q	—N/a		15.700	—N/a	15.600 Q	—N/a		15.925	—N/a				15.975	—N/a	
Total	Team	60.925	61.200	62.850	65.325	63.300	61.075	374.675	1 Q	45.925	46.025	48.875	49.325	49.025	46.950	286.125	1st place, gold medalist(s)

Individual finals

Athlete	Event	Apparatus						Total	Rank
Athlete	Event	F	PH	R	V	PB	HB	Total	Rank
Chen Yibing	All-around	0.000	13.750	16.650	15.900	14.950	12.975	74.225	24
Chen Yibing	Rings	—N/a		16.600	—N/a			16.600	1st place, gold medalist(s)
Huang Xu	Parallel bars	—N/a				15.700	—N/a	15.700	6
Li Xiaopeng	Parallel bars	—N/a				16.450	—N/a	16.450	1st place, gold medalist(s)
Xiao Qin	Pommel horse	—N/a	15.875	—N/a				15.875	1st place, gold medalist(s)
Yang Wei	All-around	15.250	15.275	16.625	16.550	16.100	14.775	94.575	1st place, gold medalist(s)
Yang Wei	Pommel horse	—N/a	15.450	—N/a				15.450	4
Yang Wei	Rings	—N/a		16.425	—N/a			16.425	2nd place, silver medalist(s)
Zou Kai	Floor	16.050	—N/a					16.050	1st place, gold medalist(s)
Zou Kai	Horizontal bar	—N/a					16.200	16.200	1st place, gold medalist(s)

Women
Team

Athlete	Event	Qualification						Final					
Athlete	Event	Apparatus				Total	Rank	Apparatus				Total	Rank
Athlete	Event	F	V	UB	BB	Total	Rank	F	V	UB	BB	Total	Rank
Cheng Fei	Team	15.750 Q	16.150 Q	—N/a	15.875 Q	—N/a		15.450	16.000	—N/a	15.150	—N/a	
Deng Linlin	Team	14.950	15.225	14.725	15.550	60.450	9*	15.250	—N/a	15.925	15.150	—N/a	
He Kexin	Team	—N/a	15.250	15.725 Q	—N/a			—N/a		16.850	—N/a		
Jiang Yuyan	Team	15.050 Q	14.775	15.550	15.250	60.625	7 Q	15.200	—N/a	15.975	—N/a		
Li Shanshan	Team	14.200	—N/a		16.125 Q	—N/a		—N/a			16.050	—N/a	
Yang Yilin	Team	15.000	15.200	16.650 Q	15.500	62.350	3 Q	—N/a	15.100	16.800	—N/a		
Total	Team	60.750	61.825	62.650	63.050	248.275	1 Q	45.800	46.350	49.625	47.125	188.900	1st place, gold medalist(s)

* Only two gymnasts per country may advance to a final.

Individual finals

Athlete	Event	Apparatus				Total	Rank
Athlete	Event	F	V	UB	BB	Total	Rank
Cheng Fei	Floor	14.550	—N/a			14.550	7
Cheng Fei	Vault	—N/a	15.852	—N/a		15.852	3rd place, bronze medalist(s)
Cheng Fei	Balance beam	—N/a			15.950	15.950	3rd place, bronze medalist(s)
Jiang Yuyuan	All-around	14.775	14.825	15.875	15.425	60.900	6
Jiang Yuyuan	Floor	15.350	—N/a			15.350	4
He Kexin	Uneven bars	—N/a		16.725	—N/a	16.725	1st place, gold medalist(s)
Li Shanshan	Balance beam	—N/a			15.300	15.300	6
Yang Yilin	All-around	15.000	15.175	16.725	15.750	62.650	3rd place, bronze medalist(s)
Yang Yilin	Uneven bars	—N/a		16.650	—N/a	16.650	3rd place, bronze medalist(s)

=== Rhythmic ===
Athlete	Event	Qualification						Final					
Athlete	Event	Rope	Hoop	Clubs	Ribbon	Total	Rank	Rope	Hoop	Clubs	Ribbon	Total	Rank
Li Hongyang	Individual	16.675	16.425	16.375	16.475	65.950	13	Did not advance					

Athlete	Event	Qualification				Final			
Athlete	Event	5 ropes	3 hoops 2 clubs	Total	Rank	5 ropes	3 hoops 2 clubs	Total	Rank
Cai Tongtong; Chou Tao; Lü Yuanyang; Sui Jianshuang; Sun Dan; Zhang Shuo	Team	17.300	17.225	34.525	3 Q	17.575	17.650	35.225	2nd place, silver medalist(s)

=== Trampoline ===
Athlete	Event	Qualification		Final	
Athlete	Event	Score	Rank	Score	Rank
Dong Dong	Men's	71.70	3 Q	40.60	3rd place, bronze medalist(s)
Lu Chunlong	Men's	72.40	1 Q	41.00	1st place, gold medalist(s)
He Wenna	Women's	67.20	1 Q	37.80	1st place, gold medalist(s)
Huang Shanshan	Women's	69.00	15	Did not advance	

== Handball ==
=== Men's tournament ===
The men's handball team had competed for the first time at the Olympics. China was drawn in Group A with Poland, France, Croatia, Brazil and Spain.

Roster

The following is the China roster in the men's handball tournament of the 2008 Summer Olympics.

Head coach: (South Korea) Yam Weiming

No.	Pos.	Name	Date of birth (age)	Height	App.	Goals	Club
2	P	Cui Liang	20 February 1983 (aged 25)	1.95 m	80	354	(China) Beijing Army
3	CB	Zhu Jie	30 January 1978 (aged 30)	1.87 m	70	278	(China) Guangdong Handball Team
5	P	Yan Liang	23 January 1985 (aged 23)	2.01 m	40	105	(China) Jiangsu Suzhou
6	RB	Cui Lei	15 October 1980 (aged 27)	1.97 m	50	186	(China) Beijing Army
7	CB	Zhang Ji	5 November 1978 (aged 29)	1.86 m	30	120	(China) Beijing Handball Team
8	P	Zhou Xiaojian	13 January 1985 (aged 23)	1.98 m	40	113	(China) Jiangsu Suzhou
10	RW	Li Hexin	16 September 1985 (aged 22)	1.94 m	20	10	(China) Shanghai Handball Team
11	LW	Zhang Xing	13 June 1986 (aged 22)	1.93 m	30	97	(China) Jiangsu Suzhou
12	GK	Wang Long	27 November 1985 (aged 22)	1.95 m	25		(China) Beijing Handball Team
13	RW	Wang Xiaolong	17 August 1989 (aged 18)	1.87 m	30	116	(China) Anhui Hefei
14	LB	Tian Jianxia	3 September 1986 (aged 21)	1.90 m	40	132	(China) Tianjing Handball Team
16	GK	Ye Qiang	16 June 1978 (aged 30)	1.93 m	75		(China) Jiangsu Suzhou
18	LB	Hao Kexin	25 January 1986 (aged 22)	1.98 m	50	233	(China) Jiangsu Suzhou
19	RB	Miao Qing	4 February 1983 (aged 25)	2.00 m	50	225	(China) Beijing Army
20	LW	Zhu Wenxin	11 February 1980 (aged 28)	1.76 m	50	365	(China) Beijing Army

Group play

Team	Pld	W	D	L	GF	GA	GD	Pts	Qualification
France	5	4	1	0	148	115	+33	9	Qualified for the quarterfinals
Poland	5	3	1	1	147	128	+19	7	Qualified for the quarterfinals
Croatia	5	3	0	2	140	115	+25	6	Qualified for the quarterfinals
Spain	5	3	0	2	152	145	+7	6	Qualified for the quarterfinals
Brazil	5	1	0	4	129	153	−24	2	
China	5	0	0	5	104	164	−60	0	

10 August 2008; 19:00	Poland	33 – 19	China	Olympic Sports Centre Gymnasium; Referees: Karbaschi, Kolahdouzan (IRI)
10 August 2008; 19:00	Jurasik 8	(21–10)	five players 3	Olympic Sports Centre Gymnasium; Referees: Karbaschi, Kolahdouzan (IRI)
10 August 2008; 19:00	3× (yellow card) 3× (suspension)	Report	3× (yellow card) 3× (suspension)	Olympic Sports Centre Gymnasium; Referees: Karbaschi, Kolahdouzan (IRI)

12 August 2008; 14:00	China	19 – 33	France	Olympic Sports Centre Gymnasium; Referees: Canbro, Claesson (SWE)
12 August 2008; 14:00	Hao 5	(7–19)	three players 5	Olympic Sports Centre Gymnasium; Referees: Canbro, Claesson (SWE)
12 August 2008; 14:00	3× (yellow card) 4× (suspension)	Report	3× (yellow card) 2× (suspension)	Olympic Sports Centre Gymnasium; Referees: Canbro, Claesson (SWE)

14 August 2008; 15:45	China	22 – 36	Spain	Olympic Sports Centre Gymnasium; Referees: Elmoamli, Shaban Ali (EGY)
14 August 2008; 15:45	Cui 5	(12–16)	Tomás 7	Olympic Sports Centre Gymnasium; Referees: Elmoamli, Shaban Ali (EGY)
14 August 2008; 15:45	3× (yellow card) 2× (suspension)	Report	3× (yellow card) 1× (suspension)	Olympic Sports Centre Gymnasium; Referees: Elmoamli, Shaban Ali (EGY)

16 August 2008; 09:00	Brazil	29 – 22	China	Olympic Sports Centre Gymnasium; Referees: Elmoamli, Shaban Ali (EGY)
16 August 2008; 09:00	Ribeiro, Laureano 5	(14–10)	Cui Liang, Cui Lei 4	Olympic Sports Centre Gymnasium; Referees: Elmoamli, Shaban Ali (EGY)
16 August 2008; 09:00	3× (yellow card) 3× (suspension)	Report	4× (yellow card) 4× (suspension)	Olympic Sports Centre Gymnasium; Referees: Elmoamli, Shaban Ali (EGY)

18 August 2008; 15:45	Croatia	33 – 22	China	Olympic Sports Centre Gymnasium; Referees: Karbaschi, Kolahdouzan (IRI)
18 August 2008; 15:45	Šprem 8	(17–13)	Hao 6	Olympic Sports Centre Gymnasium; Referees: Karbaschi, Kolahdouzan (IRI)
18 August 2008; 15:45	2× (yellow card) 3× (suspension)	Report	3× (yellow card) 1× (suspension) 1× (red card)	Olympic Sports Centre Gymnasium; Referees: Karbaschi, Kolahdouzan (IRI)

=== Women's tournament ===
Roster

The following is the China roster in the women's handball tournament of the 2008 Summer Olympics.

Head coach: (South Korea) Kang Jae-won

No.	Pos.	Name	Date of birth (age)	Height	App.	Goals	Club
1	GK	Liu Guini	28 May 1982 (aged 26)	1.76 m	50		(China) Shandong Weihai
2	RW	Wei Qiuxiang	15 February 1986 (aged 22)	1.75 m	30	182	(China) Jiangsu Guangzhou
3	P	Liu Yun	6 March 1982 (aged 26)	1.80 m	70	396	(China) Anhui Hefei
7	CB	Zhang Geng	9 March 1980 (aged 28)	1.76 m	50	216	(China) Guangdong Guangzhou
9	RW	Wang Min	14 June 1980 (aged 28)	1.74 m	60	197	(China) Shanghai Handball Team
10	LB	Wang Shasha	8 January 1987 (aged 21)	1.76 m	70	377	(China) Shandong Weihai
12	GK	Huang Hong	7 March 1980 (aged 28)	1.83 m	50		(China) Anhui Hefei
13	LW	Wu Yanan	14 September 1981 (aged 26)	1.70 m	65	226	(China) Beijing Army
14	RB	Liu Xiaomei	2 May 1985 (aged 23)	1.78 m	60	300	(China) Anhui Hefei
15	P	Sun Laimiao	8 April 1981 (aged 27)	1.76 m	50	168	(China) Anhui Hefei
18	CB	Wu Wenjuan	5 July 1981 (aged 27)	1.82 m	60	235	(China) Shanghai Handball Team
19	CB	Li Weiwei	7 July 1982 (aged 26)	1.79 m	60	364	(China) Beijing Army
21	LB	Li Bing	21 January 1980 (aged 28)	1.82 m	70	347	(China) Beijing Army
22	LW	Huang Dongjie	22 December 1981 (aged 26)	1.75 m	55	215	(China) Heilongjiang Harbin
23	RB	Yan Meizhu	28 January 1989 (aged 19)	1.87 m	30	85	(China) Beijing Handball Team

Group play

Team	Pld	W	D	L	GF	GA	GD	Pts	Qualification
Norway	5	5	0	0	154	106	+48	10	Qualified for the quarterfinals
Romania	5	4	0	1	150	112	+38	8	Qualified for the quarterfinals
China	5	2	0	3	122	135	−13	4	Qualified for the quarterfinals
France	5	2	0	3	121	128	−7	4	Qualified for the quarterfinals
Kazakhstan	5	1	1	3	109	137	−28	3	
Angola	5	0	1	4	109	147	−38	1	

9 August 2008; 19:00	Norway	30 – 23	China	Olympic Sports Centre Gymnasium; Referees: Elmoamli, Shaban Ali (EGY)
9 August 2008; 19:00	Hammerseng 7	(13–12)	Li Weiwei 8	Olympic Sports Centre Gymnasium; Referees: Elmoamli, Shaban Ali (EGY)
9 August 2008; 19:00	3× (yellow card) 5× (suspension)	Report	3× (yellow card) 7× (suspension)	Olympic Sports Centre Gymnasium; Referees: Elmoamli, Shaban Ali (EGY)

11 August 2008; 19:00	China	20 – 34	Romania	Olympic Sports Centre Gymnasium; Referees: Liudownyk, Vakula (UKR)
11 August 2008; 19:00	Wei Qiuxiang 6	(11–17)	Amariei 9	Olympic Sports Centre Gymnasium; Referees: Liudownyk, Vakula (UKR)
11 August 2008; 19:00	3× (yellow card) 3× (suspension)	Report	3× (yellow card) 5× (suspension)	Olympic Sports Centre Gymnasium; Referees: Liudownyk, Vakula (UKR)

13 August 2008; 15:45	China	32 – 24	Angola	Olympic Sports Centre Gymnasium; Referees: Canbro, Claesson (SWE)
13 August 2008; 15:45	Liu Xiaomei 7	(14–12)	Almeida 8	Olympic Sports Centre Gymnasium; Referees: Canbro, Claesson (SWE)
13 August 2008; 15:45	3× (yellow card) 5× (suspension) 1× (red card)	Report	4× (yellow card) 2× (suspension)	Olympic Sports Centre Gymnasium; Referees: Canbro, Claesson (SWE)

15 August 2008; 09:00	Kazakhstan	29 – 26	China	Olympic Sports Centre Gymnasium; Referees: Lemme, Ullrich (GER)
15 August 2008; 09:00	Pikalova 8	(14–10)	Li Weiwei 11	Olympic Sports Centre Gymnasium; Referees: Lemme, Ullrich (GER)
15 August 2008; 09:00	3× (yellow card) 5× (suspension)	Report	3× (yellow card) 3× (suspension)	Olympic Sports Centre Gymnasium; Referees: Lemme, Ullrich (GER)

17 August 2008; 15:45	France	18 – 21	China	Olympic Sports Centre Gymnasium; Referees: Liudowyk, Vakula (UKR)
17 August 2008; 15:45	Ayglon 5	(10–9)	Wu Wenjuan 5	Olympic Sports Centre Gymnasium; Referees: Liudowyk, Vakula (UKR)
17 August 2008; 15:45	3× (yellow card) 2× (suspension)	Report	3× (yellow card) 6× (suspension)	Olympic Sports Centre Gymnasium; Referees: Liudowyk, Vakula (UKR)

Quarterfinal

19 August 2008; 18:00	South Korea	31 – 23	China	Olympic Sports Centre Gymnasium; Referees: Aires, Aparecido (BRA)
19 August 2008; 18:00	Park Chung-hee 8	(16–12)	Huang Dongjie 5	Olympic Sports Centre Gymnasium; Referees: Aires, Aparecido (BRA)
19 August 2008; 18:00	3× (yellow card) 4× (suspension)	Report	4× (yellow card) 1× (suspension)	Olympic Sports Centre Gymnasium; Referees: Aires, Aparecido (BRA)

Classification semifinal

21 August 2008; 12:00	Sweden	19 – 20	China	Beijing National Indoor Stadium; Referees: Karbaschi, Kolahdouzan (IRI)
21 August 2008; 12:00	Torstenson 6	(7–8)	Wang Shasha 5	Beijing National Indoor Stadium; Referees: Karbaschi, Kolahdouzan (IRI)
21 August 2008; 12:00	4× (yellow card) 5× (suspension)	Report	3× (yellow card) 3× (suspension)	Beijing National Indoor Stadium; Referees: Karbaschi, Kolahdouzan (IRI)

5th–6th place

23 August 2008; 10:15	China	23 – 31	France	Beijing National Indoor Stadium; Referees: Krstic, Ljubic (SLO)
23 August 2008; 10:15	Liu Yun 7	(10–15)	Herbrecht, Pecqueux-Rolland 7	Beijing National Indoor Stadium; Referees: Krstic, Ljubic (SLO)
23 August 2008; 10:15	3× (yellow card) 1× (suspension)	Report	3× (yellow card) 1× (suspension)	Beijing National Indoor Stadium; Referees: Krstic, Ljubic (SLO)

== Judo ==
Men

Athlete	Event	Preliminary	Round of 32	Round of 16	Quarterfinals	Semifinals	Repechage 1	Repechage 2	Repechage 3	Final / BM	
Athlete	Event	Opposition Result	Opposition Result	Opposition Result	Opposition Result	Opposition Result	Opposition Result	Opposition Result	Opposition Result	Opposition Result	Rank
Liu Renwang	−60 kg	Bye	Utarbayev (KAZ); W 0001–0000	Kishmakov (RUS); L 0000–0100	Did not advance						
Wu Ritubilige	−66 kg	Bye	Ungvári (HUN); L 0001–0011	Did not advance							
Si Rijigawa	−73 kg	—N/a	Leon (VEN); W 0001–0000	Huysuz (TUR); W 0010–0001	Boqiev (TJK); L 0001–1110	Did not advance	Bye	Bilodid (UKR); L 0000–0001	Did not advance		
Guo Lei	−81 kg	Bye	Vis (ARU); W 1100–0000	Mrvaljević (MNE); L 0001–0111	Did not advance						
He Yanzhu	−90 kg	—N/a	Santos (BRA); L 0000–1000	Did not advance							
Shao Ning	−100 kg	—N/a	Matyjaszek (POL); L 0000–1101	Did not advance							
Pan Song	+100 kg	Bye	Dzhanagulov (KGZ); W 1001–0001	Tmenov (RUS); L 0000–0200	Did not advance						

Women

Athlete	Event	Round of 32	Round of 16	Quarterfinals	Semifinals	Repechage 1	Repechage 2	Repechage 3	Final / BM	
Athlete	Event	Opposition Result	Opposition Result	Opposition Result	Opposition Result	Opposition Result	Opposition Result	Opposition Result	Opposition Result	Rank
Wu Shugen	−48 kg	Tani (JPN); L 0000–0100	Did not advance							
Xian Dongmei	−52 kg	Bye	Carrascosa (ESP); W 1000–0000	Monteiro (POR); W 1011–0010	Haddad (ALG); W 1001–0000	Bye			An K-A (PRK); W 0011–0001	1st place, gold medalist(s)
Xu Yan	−57 kg	Latrous (ALG); W 1001–0001	Koivumäki (FIN); W 0020–0000	Sato (JPN); W 0010–0002	Gravenstijn (NED); L 0001–0100	Bye			Harel (FRA); W 0011–0001	3rd place, bronze medalist(s)
Xu Yuhua	−63 kg	Kong J-Y (KOR); L 0100–0012	Did not advance							
Wang Juan	−70 kg	Bye	Ueno (JPN); L 0001–1011	Did not advance		Park K-Y (KOR); W 0010–0000	Mészáros (HUN); L 0000–1010	Did not advance		
Yang Xiuli	−78 kg	Proskurakova (KGZ); W 1000–0000	Lkhamdegd (MGL); W 1021–0000	Levesque (CAN); W 1000–0000	San Miguel (ESP); W 1031–0000	Bye			Castillo (CUB); W 0000–0000 YUS	1st place, gold medalist(s)
Tong Wen	+78 kg	Donguzashvili (RUS); W 1000–0000	Prokof'yeva (UKR); W 1000–0000	Kim N-Y (KOR); W 1001–0000	Ortiz (CUB); W 0010–0000	Bye			Tsukada (JPN); W 1001–0010	1st place, gold medalist(s)

== Modern pentathlon ==
Athlete	Event	Shooting (10 m air pistol)			Fencing (épée one touch)			Swimming (200 m freestyle)			Riding (show jumping)			Running (3000 m)			Total points	Final rank
Athlete	Event	Points	Rank	MP Points	Results	Rank	MP points	Time	Rank	MP points	Penalties	Rank	MP points	Time	Rank	MP Points	Total points	Final rank
Cao Zhongrong	Men's	160	36	856	21–14	5	904	2:01.53	4	1344	488	29	712	9:57.67	29	1012	4828	31
Qian Zhenhua	Men's	189	2	1204	26–9	1	1024	2:07.46	22	1272	168	19	1032	10:04.40	34	984	5516	4
Chen Qian	Women's	177	19	1060	20–15	=11	880	2:18.58	15	1260	0	3	1200	10:27.41	8	1212	5612	5
Xiu Xiu	Women's	183	11	1132	19–16	=14	856	2:17.17	=13	1276	56	12	1144	11:06.31	27	1056	5464	10

== Rowing ==
China qualified for 11 of the total 14 rowing events. Zhang Liang was disqualified from the men's single sculls after he forgot the time of his race and failed to turn to the right heat. When Liang finally arrived to take part in the single scull the competition had already finished. "I wrongly remembered my time as that of the third group, but actually it was the second group", he explained. The rules of the International Rowing Federation say if an athlete fails to attend a race he forfeits his right to compete in further races. Therefore, Zhang not only missed the single sculls but also forfeited his right to compete in the double sculls. This meant his action had also automatically disqualified his teammate Su Hui. The China Water Sports Administration appealed the decision but the plea was rejected. "This shows we still have some problems in team organization", commented Wei Di, the director of China's water sports programs.

Men

Athlete	Event	Heats		Repechage		Quarterfinals		Semifinals		Final	
Athlete	Event	Time	Rank	Time	Rank	Time	Rank	Time	Rank	Time	Rank
Zhang Liang	Single sculls	DNS		—N/a		Did not advance					
Su Hui; Zhang Liang	Double sculls	Excluded				—N/a		Did not advance			
Sun Jie; Zhang Guolin	Lightweight double sculls	6:17.62	2 SA/B	Bye		—N/a		6:29.29	3 FA	6:16.69	5
Guo Kang; Song Kai; Zhang Xingbo; Zhao Linquan	Four	6:09.64	4 R	6:02.37	4	—N/a		Did not advance			
Huang Zhongming; Tian Jun; Wu Chongkui; Zhang Lin	Lightweight four	5:51.30	1 SA/B	Bye		—N/a		6:12.55	5 FB	6:04.48	8
Liu Zhen; Qu Xiaoming; Wang Jingfeng; Wang Xiangdang; Zhang Dechang; Zhang Shunyin; Zhang Yongqiang; Zheng Chuanqi; Zhou Yinan	Eight	5:35.09	3 R	5:42.97	5 FA	—N/a				5:34.59	7

Women

Athlete	Event	Heats		Repechage		Quarterfinals		Semifinals		Final	
Athlete	Event	Time	Rank	Time	Rank	Time	Rank	Time	Rank	Time	Rank
Zhang Xiuyun	Single sculls	7:38.16	1 QF	—N/a		7:23.30	2 SA/B	7:31.33	1 FA	7:25.48	4
Wu You; Gao Yulan	Pair	7:32.50	3 R	7:23.71	1 FA	—N/a				7:22.28	2nd place, silver medalist(s)
Li Qin; Tian Liang	Double sculls	7:03.13	1 FA	Bye		—N/a				7:15.85	4
Xu Dongxiang; Yu Hua	Lightweight double sculls	6:57.58	1 SA/B	Bye		—N/a		7:11.59	2 FA	7:01.90	5
Jin Ziwei; Tang Bin; Xi Aihua; Zhang Yangyang	Quadruple sculls	6:11.83	1 SA/B	Bye		—N/a				6:16.06	1st place, gold medalist(s)

Qualification Legend: FA=Final A (medal); FB=Final B (non-medal); FC=Final C (non-medal); FD=Final D (non-medal); FE=Final E (non-medal); FF=Final F (non-medal); SA/B=Semifinals A/B; SC/D=Semifinals C/D; SE/F=Semifinals E/F; QF=Quarterfinals; R=Repechage

== Sailing ==
China has qualified for all 11 sailing events.

Men

Athlete	Event	Race											Net points	Final rank
Athlete	Event	1	2	3	4	5	6	7	8	9	10	M*	Net points	Final rank
Wang Aichen	RS:X	2	8	9	16	2	14	~~22~~	14	19	1	10	95	7
Shen Sheng	Laser	~~40~~	35	6	4	37	14	10	28	25	CAN	EL	159	20
Deng Daokun; Wang Weidong	470	12	~~DSQ~~	23	16	21	26	OCS	22	8	28	EL	186	26
Li Hongquan; Wang He	Star	~~16~~	16	16	14	16	16	15	15	16	16	EL	140	16

Women

Athlete	Event	Race											Net points	Final rank
Athlete	Event	1	2	3	4	5	6	7	8	9	10	M*	Net points	Final rank
Yin Jian	RS:X	1	1	1	3	3	~~13~~	7	8	8	1	6	39	1st place, gold medalist(s)
Xu Lijia	Laser Radial	~~24~~	3	10	6	5	2	1	16	6	CAN	6	50	3rd place, bronze medalist(s)
Wen Yimei; Yu Chunyan	470	5	10	19	17	16	14	~~OCS~~	12	16	10	EL	119	18
Li Xiaoni; Song Xiaqun; Yu Yanli	Yngling	7	5	~~DSQ~~	4	13	6	8	4	CAN	CAN	8	65	8

Open

Athlete	Event	Race																Net points	Final rank
Athlete	Event	1	2	3	4	5	6	7	8	9	10	11	12	13	14	15	M*	Net points	Final rank
Zhang Peng	Finn	25	23	24	20	5	~~26~~	23	11	CAN	CAN	—N/a					EL	131	24
Hu Xianqiang; Li Fei	49er	18	~~19~~	19	19	16	17	15	17	15	14	18	9	CAN	CAN	CAN	EL	176	19
Chen Xiuke; Luo Youjia	Tornado	9	14	~~OCS~~	DNF	13	5	14	13	12	14	—N/a					EL	102	14

M = Medal race; EL = Eliminated – did not advance into the medal race; CAN = Race cancelled

== Shooting ==
Men

Athlete	Event	Qualification		Final	
Athlete	Event	Points	Rank	Points	Rank
Cao Yifei	10 m air rifle	593	14	Did not advance	
Hu Binyuan	Double trap	138	3 Q	184	3rd place, bronze medalist(s)
Jia Zhanbo	50 m rifle prone	591	27	Did not advance	
Jia Zhanbo	50 m rifle 3 positions	1163	24	Did not advance	
Jin Di	Skeet	118	7	Did not advance	
Li Yajun	Trap	113	21	Did not advance	
Li Yang	Trap	115	16	Did not advance	
Lin Zhongzai	50 m pistol	555	16	Did not advance	
Liu Zhongsheng	25 m rapid fire pistol	572	9	Did not advance	
Pang Wei	10 m air pistol	586	1 Q	688.2	1st place, gold medalist(s)
Qiu Jian	50 m rifle prone	593	19	Did not advance	
Qiu Jian	50 m rifle 3 positions	1173	4	1272.5	1st place, gold medalist(s)
Qu Ridong	Skeet	118	6 Q	142	6
Tan Zongliang	10 m air pistol	580	11	Did not advance	
Tan Zongliang	50 m pistol	565	1 Q	659.5	2nd place, silver medalist(s)
Wang Nan	Double trap	134	12	Did not advance	
Zhang Penghui	25 m rapid fire pistol	DSQ		Did not advance	
Zhu Qinan	10 m air rifle	597	2 Q	699.7	2nd place, silver medalist(s)

Women

Athlete	Event	Qualification		Final	
Athlete	Event	Points	Rank	Points	Rank
Chen Ying	25 m pistol	585	3 Q	793.4 OR	1st place, gold medalist(s)
Du Li	10 m air rifle	399	4 Q	499.6	5
Du Li	50 m rifle 3 positions	589 OR	1 Q	690.3 OR	1st place, gold medalist(s)
Fei Fengji	25 m pistol	582	7 Q	787.9	4
Guo Wenjun	10 m air pistol	390	2 Q	492.3 OR	1st place, gold medalist(s)
Liu Yingzi	Trap	63	12	Did not advance	
Ren Jie	10 m air pistol	381	19	Did not advance	
Wei Ning	Skeet	70	5 Q	91	6
Wu Liuxi	50 m rifle 3 positions	585	7 Q	685.9	8
Zhao Yinghui	10 m air rifle	389	37	Did not advance	

== Softball ==
A squad of 15 players made up China's women's team at the Games. The team finished sixth in the group stage and did not advance to the medal matches.

All times are China Standard Time (UTC+8)

Team	W	L	RS	RA	WIN%	GB	Tiebreaker
United States	7	0	53	1	1.000	-	-
Japan	6	1	23	13	.857	1	-
Australia	5	2	30	11	.714	2	-
Canada	3	4	17	23	.429	4	-
Chinese Taipei	2	5	10	23	.286	5	2-0 vs. CHN/VEN
China	2	5	19	21	.286	5	1-1 vs. TPE/VEN
Venezuela	2	5	15	35	.286	5	0-2 vs. CHN/TPE
Netherlands	1	6	8	48	.143	6	-

Results

Group stage All times are China Standard Time (UTC+8)

Team	1	2	3	4	5	6	7	R	H	E
China	0	0	0	0	5	1	4	10	13	1
Netherlands	0	0	0	0	2	0	0	2	5	3
WP: Huili Yu(1-0) LP: Kristi de Varies(0-1); Home runs: CHN: Lifang Zhang(1), Zhou Yi(1); NED: Marloes Fellinger(1)

Team	1	2	3	4	5	6	7	R	H	E
China	1	0	1	0	3	1	1	7	10	1
Venezuela	0	0	0	1	0	0	0	1	6	0
WP: Wei Lu(1-0) LP: Mariangee Bogado(0-1); Home runs: CHN: Yanhong Yu(1); VEN: None

Team	1	2	3	4	5	6	7	R	H	E
China	0	0	1	0	0	0	0	1	3	0
Australia	1	2	0	0	0	0	0	3	4	2
WP: Tanya Harding(1-1) LP: Huili Yu(1-1); Home runs: CHN: None; AUS: Simmone Morrow(1,2)

Team	1	2	3	4	5	6	7	R	H	E
China	0	0	0	0	0	0	0	0	2	0
Canada	0	0	0	0	0	1	0	1	3	2
WP: Lauren Bay(2-0) LP: Wei Lu(1-1); Home runs: CHN: None; CAN: Jennifer Yee(1)

Team	1	2	3	4	5	6	7	R	H	E
Japan	0	0	3	0	0	0	0	3	2	0
China	0	0	0	0	0	0	0	0	6	2
WP: Yukiko Ueno(2-0) LP: Wei Lu(1-2) Sv: Hiroko Sakai(1); Home runs: JPN: Rie Sato(1); CHN: None

Team	1	2	3	4	5	6	7	R	H	E
Chinese Taipei	1	0	0	1	0	0	0	2	6	1
China	0	1	0	0	0	0	0	1	5	1
WP: Ming-Hui Chueh(1-0) LP: Huili Yu(1-2)

Team	1	2	3	4	5	6	7	R	H	E
China	0	0	0	0	0	X	X	0	1	1
United States	9	0	0	0	X	X	X	9	9	0
WP: Cat Osterman(3-0) LP: Wei Lu(1-3); Home runs: CHN: None; USA: Kelly Kretschman(1)

== Swimming ==
Men

Athlete	Event	Heat		Semifinal		Final	
Athlete	Event	Time	Rank	Time	Rank	Time	Rank
Cai Li	50 m freestyle	22.50	30	Did not advance			
Chen Yin	200 m butterfly	1:56.55	15 Q	1:55.88	11	Did not advance	
Chen Zuo	100 m freestyle	49.08	25	Did not advance			
Deng Jian	200 m backstroke	2:03.34	37	Did not advance			
Lai Zhongjian	200 m breaststroke	2:16.28	44	Did not advance			
Qu Jingyu	200 m individual medley	2:03.15	34	Did not advance			
Shi Feng	100 m butterfly	51.87	12 Q	51.68	9	Did not advance	
Sun Xiaolei	100 m backstroke	56.44	37	Did not advance			
Sun Yang	400 m freestyle	3:50.90	28	—N/a		Did not advance	
Sun Yang	1500 m freestyle	14:48.39	7 Q	—N/a		15:05.12	8
Wu Peng	200 m butterfly	1:55.39	7 Q	1:54.93	5 Q	1:54.35	4
Xin Tong	10 km open water	—N/a				2:09:13.4	23
Xue Ruipeng	100 m breaststroke	1:02.48	46	Did not advance			
Zhang Enjian	200 m freestyle	1:49.15	33	Did not advance			
Zhang Lin	400 m freestyle	3:43.32	2 Q	—N/a		3:42.44	2nd place, silver medalist(s)
Zhang Lin	1500 m freestyle	14:45.84	4 Q	—N/a		14:55.20	7
Cai Li; Chen Zuo; Huang Shaohua; Lü Zhiwu	4 × 100 m freestyle relay	3:16.16	12	—N/a		Did not advance	
Shi Haoran; Sun Yang; Zhang Enjian; Zhang Lin	4 × 200 m freestyle relay	7:13.57	10	—N/a		Did not advance	

Women

Athlete	Event	Heat		Semifinal		Final	
Athlete	Event	Time	Rank	Time	Rank	Time	Rank
Chen Huijia	100 m breaststroke	1:08.24	12 Q	1:08.60	12	Did not advance	
Chen Yanyan	200 m backstroke	2:11.95	19	Did not advance			
Jiao Liuyang	200 m butterfly	2:06.89	4 Q	2:06.42	3 Q	2:04.72	2nd place, silver medalist(s)
Li Jiaxing	200 m individual medley	2:12.53	12 Q	2:13.47	15	Did not advance	
Li Mo	400 m freestyle	4:15.50	26	—N/a		Did not advance	
Li Xuanxu	800 m freestyle	8:24.37	7 Q	—N/a		8:26.34	5
Li Xuanxu	400 m individual medley	4:36.35	6 Q	—N/a		4:42.13	8
Li Zhesi	50 m freestyle	25.00	12 Q	24.90	13	Did not advance	
Liu Jing	400 m individual medley	4:44.96	25	—N/a		Did not advance	
Liu Zige	200 m butterfly	2:06.46	1 Q	2:06.25	1 Q	2:04.18 WR	1st place, gold medalist(s)
Luo Nan	200 m breaststroke	2:29.67	26	Did not advance			
Pang Jiaying	100 m freestyle	54.01	=7 Q	DSQ		Did not advance	
Pang Jiaying	200 m freestyle	1:57.37 OR	6 Q	1:57.34	4 Q	1:55.05	3rd place, bronze medalist(s)
Qi Hui	200 m breaststroke	2:26.16	13 Q	2:27.63	13	Did not advance	
Qi Hui	200 m individual medley	2:14.25	20	Did not advance			
Sun Ye	100 m breaststroke	1:07.81	6 Q	1:07.72	6 Q	1:08.08	7
Tan Miao	400 m freestyle	4:12.35	22	—N/a		Did not advance	
Xu Tianlongzi	100 m backstroke	1:00.82	17	Did not advance			
Xu Yanwei	100 m butterfly	59.43	32	Did not advance			
Yanqiao Fang	10 km open water	—N/a				2:01:07.9	19
You Meihong	800 m freestyle	8:31.11	15	—N/a		Did not advance	
Zhao Jing	100 m backstroke	DSQ		Did not advance			
Zhao Jing	200 m backstroke	2:08.97	4 Q	2:09.59	10	Did not advance	
Zhou Yafei	100 m butterfly	57.70	2 Q	57.68	5 Q	57.84	4
Zhu Qianwei	200 m freestyle	1:59.52	19	Did not advance			
Zhu Yingwen	50 m freestyle	24.91	7 Q	24.76	9	Did not advance	
Zhu Yingwen	100 m freestyle	54.01	=7 Q	53.84	3 Q	54.21	6
Pang Jiaying; Tang Yi; Xu Yanwei; Zhu Yingwen	4 × 100 m freestyle relay	3:36.78	1 Q	—N/a		3:35.64	4
Pang Jiaying; Tan Miao; Tang Jingzhi*; Yang Yu; Zhu Qianwei	4 × 200 m freestyle relay	7:53.77	4 Q	—N/a		7:45.93	2nd place, silver medalist(s)
Pang Jiaying; Sun Ye; Xu Tianlongzi*; Zhao Jing; Zhou Yafei	4 × 100 m medley relay	3:59.21	4 Q	—N/a		3:56.11	3rd place, bronze medalist(s)

*Participated in the heats only and received medal.

== Synchronized swimming ==
China finished fourth at the 2007 world championships and hoped to medal in the event for the first time ever at the 2008 Summer Olympics. The Chinese were coached by Masayo Imura, the legendary Japanese synchronized swimming instructor.

Athlete	Event	Technical routine		Free routine (preliminary)			Free routine (final)		
Athlete	Event	Points	Rank	Points	Total (technical + free)	Rank	Points	Total (technical + free)	Rank
Jiang Tingting; Jiang Wenwen	Duet	48.084	4	48.500	96.584	4 Q	48.250	96.334	4
Gu Beibei; Huang Xuechen; Jiang Tingting; Jiang Wenwen; Liu Ou; Luo Xi; Sun Qiuting; Wang Na; Zhang Xiaohuan	Team	48.584	3	—N/a			48.750	97.334	3rd place, bronze medalist(s)

== Table tennis ==
Men's singles

Athlete	Event	Preliminary round	Round 1	Round 2	Round 3	Round 4	Quarterfinals	Semifinals	Final / BM	
Athlete	Event	Opposition Result	Opposition Result	Opposition Result	Opposition Result	Opposition Result	Opposition Result	Opposition Result	Opposition Result	Rank
Ma Lin	Singles	Bye			Tokic (SLO); W 4–1	Kreanga (GRE); W 4–0	Oh S-E (KOR); W 4–0	Wang Lq (CHN); W 4–2	Wang H (CHN); W 4–1	1st place, gold medalist(s)
Wang Hao	Singles	Bye			Chen Wx (AUT); W 4–0	Kan (JPN); W 4–1	Ko L C (HKG); W 4–1	Persson (SWE); W 4–1	Ma L (CHN); L 1–4	2nd place, silver medalist(s)
Wang Liqin	Singles	Bye			Błaszczyk (POL); W 4–0	Schlager (AUT); W 4–0	Tan Rw (CRO); W 4–0	Ma L (CHN); L 2–4	Persson (SWE); W 4–0	3rd place, bronze medalist(s)

Women's singles

Athlete	Event	Preliminary round	Round 1	Round 2	Round 3	Round 4	Quarterfinals	Semifinals	Final / BM	
Athlete	Event	Opposition Result	Opposition Result	Opposition Result	Opposition Result	Opposition Result	Opposition Result	Opposition Result	Opposition Result	Rank
Guo Yue	Singles	Bye			Lau S F (HKG); W 4–0	Li J (NED); W 4–0	Wu X (DOM); W 4–0	Wang N (CHN); L 2–4	Li Jw (SIN); W 4–2	3rd place, bronze medalist(s)
Wang Nan	Singles	Bye			Póta (HUN); W 4–0	Park M-Y (KOR); W 4–2	Tie Y N (HKG); W 4–1	Guo Y (CHN); W 4–2	Zhang Yn (CHN); L 1–4	2nd place, silver medalist(s)
Zhang Yining	Singles	Bye			Pavlovich (BLR); W 4–0	Fukuhara (JPN); W 4–1	Feng Tw (SIN); W 4–1	Li Jw (SIN); W 4–1	Wang N (CHN); W 4–1	1st place, gold medalist(s)

Team

Athlete	Event	Group round		Semifinals	Bronze playoff 1	Bronze playoff 2	Bronze medal	Final	
Athlete	Event	Opposition Result	Rank	Opposition Result	Opposition Result	Opposition Result	Opposition Result	Opposition Result	Rank
Ma Lin; Wang Hao; Wang Liqin	Men's team	Group A Austria; W 3 – 0 Greece; W 3 – 0 Australia; W 3 – 0	1 Q	South Korea; W 3 – 0	Bye			Germany; W 3 – 0	1st place, gold medalist(s)
Guo Yue; Wang Nan; Zhang Yining	Women's team	Group A Croatia; W 3 – 0 Dominican Republic; W 3 – 0 Austria; W 3 – 0	1 Q	Hong Kong; W 3 – 0	Bye			Singapore; W 3 – 0	1st place, gold medalist(s)

== Taekwondo ==
Athlete	Event	Round of 16	Quarterfinals	Semifinals	Repechage	Bronze Medal	Final	
Athlete	Event	Opposition Result	Opposition Result	Opposition Result	Opposition Result	Opposition Result	Opposition Result	Rank
Zhu Guo	Men's −80 kg	Ferrera (HON); W 3–1	Saei (IRI); L 2–3	Did not advance	Bista (NEP); W 6–2	Cook (GBR); W 4–1	Did not advance	3rd place, bronze medalist(s)
Liu Xiaobo	Men's +80 kg	Beach (NZL); W 4–1	Matos (CUB); L 1–2	Did not advance				
Wu Jingyu	Women's −49 kg	Alango (KEN); W 7–0	Zajc (SWE); W 8–1	Yang S-C (TPE); W 4–1	Bye		Puedpong (THA); W 1–(–1)	1st place, gold medalist(s)
Chen Zhong	Women's +67 kg	Carmona (VEN); W 3–1	Stevenson (GBR); L 1–2*	Did not advance				

* After a successful appeal by the British, judges reversed the result of the match, granting Sarah Stevenson two points for a final round kick to her opponent's head which the judges had previously missed. The reversal of the decision, after video footage was considered, is thought to be a first for the sport.

== Tennis ==
Men

Athlete	Event	Round of 64	Round of 32	Round of 16	Quarterfinals	Semifinals	Final / BM	
Athlete	Event	Opposition Score	Opposition Score	Opposition Score	Opposition Score	Opposition Score	Opposition Score	Rank
Sun Peng	Singles	González (CHI); L 4–6, 4–6	Did not advance					
Yu Xinyuan	Singles	Berdych (CZE); L 1–6, 2–6	Did not advance					
Zeng Shaoxuan	Singles	Nalbandian (ARG); L 2–6, 1–6	Did not advance					
Yu Xinyuan; Zeng Shaoxuan	Doubles	—N/a	Fyrstenberg / Matkowski (POL); L 3–6, 4–6	Did not advance				

Women

Athlete	Event	Round of 64	Round of 32	Round of 16	Quarterfinals	Semifinals	Final / BM	
Athlete	Event	Opposition Score	Opposition Score	Opposition Score	Opposition Score	Opposition Score	Opposition Score	Rank
Li Na	Singles	Kuznetsova (RUS); W 7–6^{(7–5)}, 6–4	Morita (JPN); W 6–2, 7–5	Kanepi (EST); W 4–6, 6–2, 6–0	V Williams (USA); W 7–5, 7–5	Safina (RUS); L 6–7^{(3–7)}, 5–7	Zvonareva (RUS); L 0–6, 5–7	4
Peng Shuai	Singles	Suárez Navarro (ESP); W 7–5, 7–6^{(7–2)}	Cornet (FRA); L 2–6, 2–6	Did not advance				
Yan Zi	Singles	Zvonareva (RUS); L 2–6, 0–6	Did not advance					
Zheng Jie	Singles	Szávay (HUN); W 4–6, 6–3, 7–5	Llagostera Vives (ESP); W 6–7^{(7–9)}, 6–1, 6–4	Safina (RUS); L 4–6, 3–6	Did not advance			
Peng Shuai; Sun Tiantian	Doubles	—N/a	Govortsova / Kustova (BLR); L 6–7^{(1–7)}, 6–7^{(3–7)}	Did not advance				
Yan Zi; Zheng Jie	Doubles	—N/a	Hantuchová / Husárová (SVK); W 6–1, 7–6^{(11–9)}	Gagliardi / Schnyder (SUI); W 6–3, 7–6^{(7–2)}	Kuznetsova / Safina (RUS); W 6–3, 7–5, 10–8	Medina Garrigues / Ruano Pascual (ESP); L 4–6, 6–7^{(5–7)}	A Bondarenko / K Bondarenko (UKR); W 6–2, 6–2	3rd place, bronze medalist(s)

== Triathlon ==
Athlete	Event	Swim (1.5 km)	Trans 1	Bike (40 km)	Trans 2	Run (10 km)	Total Time	Rank
Wang Daqing	Men's	18:06	0:30	59:15	0:33	37:17	1:55:41.87	46
Xing Lin	Women's	20:03	0:28	1:06:22	0:36	40:05	2:07:34.99	40
Zhang Yi	Women's	19:58	0:31	1:07:10	0:37	40:21	2:08:37.56	42

== Volleyball ==
=== Beach ===
Athlete	Event	Preliminary round	Standing	Round of 16	Quarterfinals	Semifinals	Final / BM	
Athlete	Event	Opposition Score	Standing	Opposition Score	Opposition Score	Opposition Score	Opposition Score	Rank
Wu Penggen; Xu Linyin	Men's	Pool A Gosch – Horst (AUT); W 2 – 0 (21–16, 21–15); Kais – Vesik (EST); W 2 – 1 (15–21, 21–11, 15–13); Herrera – Mesa (ESP); W 2 – 0 (21–13, 21–15)	1 Q	Klemperer – Koreng (GER); W 2 – 0 (15–21, 18–21)	Did not advance			
Tian Jia; Wang Jie	Women's	Pool A Kuhn – Schwer (SUI); W 2 – 0 (21–12, 21–18); Mouha – van Breedam (BEL); W 2 – 1 (18–21, 21–19, 15–13); Maaseide – Glesnes (NOR); W 2 – 1 (17–21, 21–14, 15–8)	1 Q	Håkedal – Tørlen (NOR); W 2 – 0 (21–13, 21–15)	D Schwaiger – S Schwaiger (AUT); W 2 – 0 (21–12, 21–12)	Xue C – Zhang X (CHN); W 2 – 1 (22–24, 29–27, 15–8)	May-Treanor – Walsh (USA); L 0 – 2 (18–21, 18–21)	2nd place, silver medalist(s)
Xue Chen; Zhang Xi	Women's	Pool D Koutroumanidou – Tsiartsiani (GRE); W 2 – 1 (21–18, 19–21, 15–12); Goller – Ludwig (GER); W 2 – 0 (21–14, 21–18); Augoustides – Nel (RSA); W 2 – 0 (21–13, 21–9)	1 Q	Crespo – Esteves (CUB); W 2 – 0 (21–19, 21–13)	Branagh – Youngs (USA); W 2 – 0 (21–17, 21–13)	Tian J – Wang J (CHN); L 1 – 2 (24–22, 27–29, 8–15)	Talita – Renata (BRA); W 2 – 0 (21–19, 21–17)	3rd place, bronze medalist(s)

=== Indoor ===
China qualified a team in both the men's and the women's tournaments. The men's team won two of their five group matches, and advanced to the final round, where they lost in the quarterfinal. The women's team won three of their five group matches, and also advanced to the final round. There, they won the quarterfinal, but lost the semifinal. They managed to win their last match, thereby securing the bronze medal.

==== Men's tournament ====
Roster

The following is the Chinese roster in the men's volleyball tournament of the 2008 Summer Olympics.

Head Coach: Zhou Jianan

No.	Name	Date of birth	Height	Weight	Spike	Block	2008 club
1	Bian Hongmin	22 September 1989	2.10 m (6 ft 11 in)	95 kg (209 lb)	355 cm (140 in)	330 cm (130 in)	(China) Zhejiang
4	Yuan Zhi	29 September 1981	1.95 m (6 ft 5 in)	88 kg (194 lb)	348 cm (137 in)	334 cm (131 in)	(China) Liaoning
5	Guo Peng	1 July 1982	2.00 m (6 ft 7 in)	84 kg (185 lb)	360 cm (140 in)	337 cm (133 in)	(China) Army
6	Shi Hairong	27 March 1977	1.92 m (6 ft 4 in)	80 kg (180 lb)	350 cm (140 in)	335 cm (132 in)	(China) Jiangsu
8	Cui Jianjun	1 August 1985	1.90 m (6 ft 3 in)	89 kg (196 lb)	350 cm (140 in)	335 cm (132 in)	(China) Henan
9	Jiao Shuai	28 January 1984	1.94 m (6 ft 4 in)	76 kg (168 lb)	350 cm (140 in)	341 cm (134 in)	(China) Henan
11	Yu Dawei	21 June 1984	1.99 m (6 ft 6 in)	90 kg (200 lb)	345 cm (136 in)	335 cm (132 in)	(China) Shandong
12	Shen Qiong (c)	5 September 1981	1.98 m (6 ft 6 in)	84 kg (185 lb)	359 cm (141 in)	349 cm (137 in)	(China) Shanghai
14	Jiang Fudong	10 January 1983	1.97 m (6 ft 6 in)	85 kg (187 lb)	345 cm (136 in)	336 cm (132 in)	(China) Sichuan
16	Ren Qi (L)	24 February 1984	1.74 m (5 ft 9 in)	70 kg (150 lb)	322 cm (127 in)	312 cm (123 in)	(China) Shanghai
17	Sui Shengsheng	30 May 1980	1.92 m (6 ft 4 in)	75 kg (165 lb)	345 cm (136 in)	334 cm (131 in)	(China) Liaoning
18	Fang Yingchao	3 August 1982	1.98 m (6 ft 6 in)	79 kg (174 lb)	360 cm (140 in)	350 cm (140 in)	(China) Shanghai

Preliminary round

Pos	Team	Pld	W	L	Pts	SPW	SPL	SPR	SW	SL	SR	Qualification
1	United States	5	5	0	10	460	371	1.240	15	4	3.750	Quarterfinals
2	Italy	5	4	1	9	439	401	1.095	13	6	2.167	Quarterfinals
3	Bulgaria	5	3	2	8	446	440	1.014	10	9	1.111	Quarterfinals
4	China	5	2	3	7	445	492	0.904	9	13	0.692	Quarterfinals
5	Venezuela	5	1	4	6	421	451	0.933	8	12	0.667	
6	Japan	5	0	5	5	392	448	0.875	4	15	0.267	

10 August 2008; 20:00	Bulgaria	3–1	China	Capital Indoor Stadium, Beijing; Attendance: 11,000; Referees: Laert Souza (BRA), Mitch Davidson (CAN)
10 August 2008; 20:00	(25–20, 25–21, 26–28, 25–19); Results Statistics			Capital Indoor Stadium, Beijing; Attendance: 11,000; Referees: Laert Souza (BRA), Mitch Davidson (CAN)

12 August 2008; 20:00	Venezuela	2–3	China	Capital Indoor Stadium, Beijing; Attendance: 12,500; Referees: Massimo Menghini (ITA), Konstantin Tufekchiev (BUL)
12 August 2008; 20:00	(21–25, 25–21, 25–16, 21–25, 14–16); Results Statistics			Capital Indoor Stadium, Beijing; Attendance: 12,500; Referees: Massimo Menghini (ITA), Konstantin Tufekchiev (BUL)

14 August 2008; 20:00	China	3–2	Japan	Capital Indoor Stadium, Beijing; Attendance: 13,000; Referees: Bela Hobor (HUN), Frank Leuthauser (GER)
14 August 2008; 20:00	(25–20, 25–23, 17–25, 16–25, 15–10) result statistics			Capital Indoor Stadium, Beijing; Attendance: 13,000; Referees: Bela Hobor (HUN), Frank Leuthauser (GER)

16 August 2008; 10:00	United States	3–0	China	Beijing Institute of Technology Gymnasium, Beijing; Attendance: 3,650; Referees: Patrick Deregnaucourt (FRA), Laert Souza (BRA)
16 August 2008; 10:00	(25–22, 25–12, 25–18) result statistics			Beijing Institute of Technology Gymnasium, Beijing; Attendance: 3,650; Referees: Patrick Deregnaucourt (FRA), Laert Souza (BRA)

18 August 2008; 20:00	China	2–3	Italy	Capital Indoor Stadium, Beijing; Attendance: 12,500; Referees: Mitch Davidson (CAN), Humberto Salas (MEX)
18 August 2008; 20:00	(17–25, 23–25, 25–21, 25–20, 14–16) result statistics			Capital Indoor Stadium, Beijing; Attendance: 12,500; Referees: Mitch Davidson (CAN), Humberto Salas (MEX)

Quarterfinal

20 August 2008; 20:00	China	0–3	Brazil	Capital Indoor Stadium, Beijing; Attendance: 13,000; Referees: Massimo Menghini (ITA), Frank Leuthauser (GER)
20 August 2008; 20:00	(17–25, 15–25, 16–25) result statistics			Capital Indoor Stadium, Beijing; Attendance: 13,000; Referees: Massimo Menghini (ITA), Frank Leuthauser (GER)

==== Women's tournament ====
Roster

The following is the Chinese roster in the women's volleyball tournament of the 2008 Summer Olympics.

Head coach: Chen Zhonghe

№	Name	Date of birth	Height	Weight	Spike	Block	2008 club
1	Wang Yimei	11 January 1988	1.90 m (6 ft 3 in)	90 kg (200 lb)	318 cm (125 in)	305 cm (120 in)	(China) Liaoning
2	Feng Kun (c)	28 December 1978	1.83 m (6 ft 0 in)	75 kg (165 lb)	319 cm (126 in)	310 cm (120 in)	(China) Beijing
3	Yang Hao	21 March 1980	1.83 m (6 ft 0 in)	75 kg (165 lb)	319 cm (126 in)	314 cm (124 in)	(China) Liaoning
4	Liu Yanan	29 September 1980	1.86 m (6 ft 1 in)	73 kg (161 lb)	320 cm (130 in)	313 cm (123 in)	(China) Liaoning
5	Wei Qiuyue	26 September 1988	1.82 m (6 ft 0 in)	65 kg (143 lb)	305 cm (120 in)	300 cm (120 in)	(China) Tianjin
6	Xu Yunli	2 August 1987	1.94 m (6 ft 4 in)	75 kg (165 lb)	313 cm (123 in)	306 cm (120 in)	(China) Fujian
7	Zhou Suhong	23 April 1979	1.82 m (6 ft 0 in)	73 kg (161 lb)	313 cm (123 in)	305 cm (120 in)	(China) Zhejiang
9	Zhao Ruirui	8 October 1981	1.98 m (6 ft 6 in)	70 kg (150 lb)	326 cm (128 in)	315 cm (124 in)	(China) Army
10	Xue Ming	23 February 1987	1.92 m (6 ft 4 in)	68 kg (150 lb)	322 cm (127 in)	310 cm (120 in)	(China) Beijing
11	Li Juan	15 May 1981	1.85 m (6 ft 1 in)	73 kg (161 lb)	315 cm (124 in)	307 cm (121 in)	(China) Tianjin
16	Zhang Na (L)	19 April 1980	1.80 m (5 ft 11 in)	72 kg (159 lb)	302 cm (119 in)	292 cm (115 in)	(China) Tianjin
17	Ma Yunwen	19 October 1986	1.89 m (6 ft 2 in)	70 kg (150 lb)	315 cm (124 in)	307 cm (121 in)	(China) Shanghai

Preliminary round

Pos	Team	Pld	W	L	Pts	SPW	SPL	SPR	SW	SL	SR	Qualification
1	Cuba	5	5	0	10	426	371	1.148	15	3	5.000	Quarterfinals
2	United States	5	4	1	9	459	441	1.041	12	9	1.333	Quarterfinals
3	China	5	3	2	8	467	395	1.182	13	7	1.857	Quarterfinals
4	Japan	5	2	3	7	381	389	0.979	7	11	0.636	Quarterfinals
5	Poland	5	1	4	6	441	445	0.991	9	12	0.750	
6	Venezuela	5	0	5	5	262	395	0.663	1	15	0.067	

9 August 2008; 20:00	Venezuela	0–3	China	Capital Indoor Stadium; Attendance: 12,000; Referees: Dejan Jovanovic (Serbia), Patrick Deregnaucourt (France)
9 August 2008; 20:00	(13–25, 13–25, 18–25) result statistics			Capital Indoor Stadium; Attendance: 12,000; Referees: Dejan Jovanovic (Serbia), Patrick Deregnaucourt (France)

11 August 2008; 20:00	China	3–1	Poland	Capital Indoor Stadium; Attendance: 12,000; Referees: Victor Manuel Rodriguez (Puerto Rico), Francisco de Souza (Brazil)
11 August 2008; 20:00	(22–25, 25–15, 25–20, 25–22) result statistics			Capital Indoor Stadium; Attendance: 12,000; Referees: Victor Manuel Rodriguez (Puerto Rico), Francisco de Souza (Brazil)

13 August 2008; 20:00	Cuba	3–2	China	Capital Indoor Stadium; Attendance: 13,000; Referees: Frank Leuthauser (Germany), Massimo Menghini (Italy)
13 August 2008; 20:00	(18–25, 14–25, 25–23, 32–30, 15–13) result statistics			Capital Indoor Stadium; Attendance: 13,000; Referees: Frank Leuthauser (Germany), Massimo Menghini (Italy)

15 August 2008; 20:00	United States	3–2	China	Capital Indoor Stadium; Attendance: 13,000; Referees: Konstantin Tufekchiev (Bulgaria), Umit Sokullu (Turkey)
15 August 2008; 20:00	(23–25, 25–22, 23–25, 25–20, 15–11) result statistics			Capital Indoor Stadium; Attendance: 13,000; Referees: Konstantin Tufekchiev (Bulgaria), Umit Sokullu (Turkey)

17 August 2008; 20:00	China	3–0	Japan	Capital Indoor Stadium; Attendance: 13,000; Referees: Kim Kun-Tae (South Korea), Janpen Jirakakul (Thailand)
17 August 2008; 20:00	(26–24, 25–16, 25–14) result statistics			Capital Indoor Stadium; Attendance: 13,000; Referees: Kim Kun-Tae (South Korea), Janpen Jirakakul (Thailand)

Quarterfinal

19 August 2008; 20:00	China	3–0	Russia	Capital Indoor Stadium; Attendance: 13,000; Referees: Humberto Salas (Mexico), Victor Manuel Rodriguez (Puerto Rico)
19 August 2008; 20:00	(25–22, 27–25, 25–19) result statistics			Capital Indoor Stadium; Attendance: 13,000; Referees: Humberto Salas (Mexico), Victor Manuel Rodriguez (Puerto Rico)

Semifinal

21 August 2008; 20:00	China	0–3	Brazil	Capital Indoor Stadium; Attendance: 13,000; Referees: Frank Leuthauser (Germany), Andrei Zenovich (Russia)
21 August 2008; 20:00	(25–27, 22–25, 14–25) result statistics			Capital Indoor Stadium; Attendance: 13,000; Referees: Frank Leuthauser (Germany), Andrei Zenovich (Russia)

Bronze medal match

23 August 2008; 12:30	Cuba	1–3	China (bronze)	Capital Indoor Stadium; Attendance: 12,500; Referees: Andrei Zenovich (Russia), Konstantin Tufekchiev (Bulgaria)
23 August 2008; 12:30	(16–25, 25–21, 13–25, 20–25) result statistics			Capital Indoor Stadium; Attendance: 12,500; Referees: Andrei Zenovich (Russia), Konstantin Tufekchiev (Bulgaria)

== Water polo ==
China participated in both the men's and the women's tournaments. The men's team finished in 12th place, while the women's team finished in 5th place.

=== Men's tournament ===
Roster

The following is the Chinese roster in the men's water polo tournament of the 2008 Summer Olympics.

№	Name	Pos.	Height	Weight	Date of birth	Club
1	Ge Weiqing	GK	1.85 m (6 ft 1 in)	90 kg (200 lb)	25 April 1977	(China) Shanghai
2	Liang Zhongxing	CB	1.98 m (6 ft 6 in)	98 kg (216 lb)	23 December 1986	(China) Guangdong Guangzhou
3	Wu Zhiyu	CB	1.98 m (6 ft 6 in)	108 kg (238 lb)	9 September 1983	(China) Shanghai
4	Yu Lijun	CF	1.96 m (6 ft 5 in)	108 kg (238 lb)	28 November 1978	(China) Shanghai
5	Li Jun	CB	1.88 m (6 ft 2 in)	85 kg (187 lb)	18 October 1980	(China) Huana Changsha
6	Tan Feihu	CF	1.90 m (6 ft 3 in)	98 kg (216 lb)	1 January 1987	(China) Huana Changsha
7	Wang Yong	D	1.84 m (6 ft 0 in)	90 kg (200 lb)	29 January 1979	(China) Shanghai
8	Li Bin	D	1.85 m (6 ft 1 in)	95 kg (209 lb)	24 October 1983	(China) Shanghai
9	Wang Beiming	D	1.87 m (6 ft 2 in)	96 kg (212 lb)	13 August 1983	(China) Shanghai
10	Xie Junmin	D	1.83 m (6 ft 0 in)	89 kg (196 lb)	17 May 1983	(China) Guangdong Guangzhou
11	Han Zhidong	D	1.82 m (6 ft 0 in)	80 kg (180 lb)	29 July 1977	(China) Guangdong Guangzhou
12	Wang Yang	D	1.86 m (6 ft 1 in)	78 kg (172 lb)	17 January 1983	(China) Guangdong Guangzhou
13	Ma Jianjun	GK	1.92 m (6 ft 4 in)	84 kg (185 lb)	8 October 1984	(China) Shanghai

Head coach: Wang Minhui

Group play

Team	Pld	W	D	L	GF	GA	GD	Pts	Qualification
United States	5	4	0	1	37	31	+6	8	Qualified for the semifinals
Croatia	5	4	0	1	56	31	+25	8	Qualified for the quarterfinals
Serbia	5	3	0	2	50	38	+12	6	Qualified for the quarterfinals
Germany	5	2	0	3	33	44	−11	4	Will play for places 7–10
Italy	5	2	0	3	57	50	+7	4	Will play for places 7–12
China	5	0	0	5	25	64	−39	0	Will play for places 7–12

All times are China Standard Time (UTC+8).

10 August 2008; 16:40	Report	United States	8–4	China	Ying Tung Natatorium, Beijing; Referees: Balfanbayev (KAZ), Brguljan (MNE)
10 August 2008; 16:40	Report	Score by quarters: 3–1, 1–2, 2–1, 2–0			Ying Tung Natatorium, Beijing; Referees: Balfanbayev (KAZ), Brguljan (MNE)
10 August 2008; 16:40	Report	Azevedo 5, Beaubien 2	Goals	Wang B. 2	Ying Tung Natatorium, Beijing; Referees: Balfanbayev (KAZ), Brguljan (MNE)

12 August 2008; 16:40	Report	Germany	6–5	China	Ying Tung Natatorium, Beijing; Referees: Moliner Molins (ESP), Hart (AUS)
12 August 2008; 16:40	Report	Score by quarters: 0–2, 5–2, 0–0, 1–1			Ying Tung Natatorium, Beijing; Referees: Moliner Molins (ESP), Hart (AUS)
12 August 2008; 16:40	Report	Savić 2, Schertwitis 2	Goals	Yu 2	Ying Tung Natatorium, Beijing; Referees: Moliner Molins (ESP), Hart (AUS)

14 August 2008; 16:40	Report	China	7–19	Italy	Ying Tung Natatorium, Beijing; Referees: Kiszelly (HUN), Koryzna (POL)
14 August 2008; 16:40	Report	Score by quarters: 2–5, 2–5, 1–4, 2–5			Ying Tung Natatorium, Beijing; Referees: Kiszelly (HUN), Koryzna (POL)
14 August 2008; 16:40	Report	Xie 3, Han 2	Goals	Calcaterra 4, Gallo 3, Angelini 3, Di Costanzo 2, Felugo 2, Mistrangelo 2	Ying Tung Natatorium, Beijing; Referees: Kiszelly (HUN), Koryzna (POL)

16 August 2008; 16:40	Report	Serbia	15–5	China	Ying Tung Natatorium, Beijing; Referees: Koryzna (POL), Oshima (JPN)
16 August 2008; 16:40	Report	Score by quarters: 5–2, 2–1, 4–2, 4–0			Ying Tung Natatorium, Beijing; Referees: Koryzna (POL), Oshima (JPN)
16 August 2008; 16:40	Report	Šapić 9, Vujasinović 3	Goals	Liang 3, Xie 2	Ying Tung Natatorium, Beijing; Referees: Koryzna (POL), Oshima (JPN)

18 August 2008; 16:40	Report	China	4–16	Croatia	Ying Tung Natatorium, Beijing
18 August 2008; 16:40	Report	Score by quarters: 0–4, 0–3, 1–1, 3–8			Ying Tung Natatorium, Beijing
18 August 2008; 16:40	Report	Wu 2	Goals	Barač 4, Joković 3, Đogaš 2, Marković 2, Hinić 2	Ying Tung Natatorium, Beijing

Classification quarter-final

20 August 2008; 10:50	Report	Greece	13–8	China	Ying Tung Natatorium, Beijing; Referees: Balfanbayev (KAZ), Knights (NZL)
20 August 2008; 10:50	Report	Score by quarters: 3–1, 4–4, 2–0, 4–3			Ying Tung Natatorium, Beijing; Referees: Balfanbayev (KAZ), Knights (NZL)
20 August 2008; 10:50	Report	Ntoskas 4, G. Afroudakis 3, C. Afroudakis 2	Goals	Xie 3, Wang Yo. 2	Ying Tung Natatorium, Beijing; Referees: Balfanbayev (KAZ), Knights (NZL)

Classification 11th–12th

22 August 2008; 09:30	Report	Canada	8–7	China	Ying Tung Natatorium, Beijing; Referees: Koryzna (POL), Argyros (GRE)
22 August 2008; 09:30	Report	Score by quarters: 1–1, 3–1, 1–2, 3–3			Ying Tung Natatorium, Beijing; Referees: Koryzna (POL), Argyros (GRE)
22 August 2008; 09:30	Report	Boyd 2, Sayegh 2	Goals	Yu 2, Han 2	Ying Tung Natatorium, Beijing; Referees: Koryzna (POL), Argyros (GRE)

=== Women's tournament ===
Roster

The following is the Chinese roster in the women's water polo tournament of the 2008 Summer Olympics.

№	Name	Pos.	Height	Weight	Date of birth	Club
1	Yang Jun	GK	1.82 m (6 ft 0 in)	70 kg (150 lb)	28 April 1988	(China) Tianjin
2	Teng Fei	D	1.70 m (5 ft 7 in)	65 kg (143 lb)	23 January 1988	(China) Tianjin
3	Liu Ping	CB	1.74 m (5 ft 9 in)	70 kg (150 lb)	1 May 1987	(China) Tianjin
4	Sun Yujun	D	1.68 m (5 ft 6 in)	65 kg (143 lb)	30 January 1987	(China) Tianjin
5	He Jin	CF	1.80 m (5 ft 11 in)	90 kg (200 lb)	3 May 1987	(China) Tianjin
6	Sun Yating	CF	1.80 m (5 ft 11 in)	75 kg (165 lb)	24 February 1988	(China) Tianjin
7	Wang Ying	CB	1.86 m (6 ft 1 in)	78 kg (172 lb)	7 August 1988	(China) Guangxi
8	Gao Ao	D	1.71 m (5 ft 7 in)	73 kg (161 lb)	26 July 1990	(China) Tianjin
9	Wang Yi	D	1.79 m (5 ft 10 in)	70 kg (150 lb)	29 July 1987	(China) Guangxi
10	Ma Huanhuan	CB	1.78 m (5 ft 10 in)	72 kg (159 lb)	13 January 1990	(China) Guangxi
11	Sun Huizi	CB	1.80 m (5 ft 11 in)	70 kg (150 lb)	11 June 1990	(China) Sichuan
12	Qiao Leiying	D	1.76 m (5 ft 9 in)	73 kg (161 lb)	24 August 1989	(China) Sichuan
13	Tan Ying	GK	1.84 m (6 ft 0 in)	75 kg (165 lb)	30 June 1987	(China) Sichuan

Head coach: Juan Jane Giralt

Group play

Team	Pld	W	D	L	GF	GA	GD	Pts	Qualification
United States	3	2	1	0	33	27	+6	5	Qualified for semifinals
Italy	3	2	1	0	28	26	+2	5	Qualified for quarterfinals
China	3	1	0	2	33	33	0	2	Qualified for quarterfinals
Russia	3	0	0	3	26	34	−8	0	Will play for places 7th–8th

All times are China Standard Time (UTC+8).

11 August 2008; 17:00	Report	United States	12–11	China	Ying Tung Natatorium, Beijing; Referees: Gabor Kiszelly (HUN), Ahmet Erhan Tulga (TUR)
11 August 2008; 17:00	Report	Score by quarters: 3–3, 5–4, 2–2, 2–2			Ying Tung Natatorium, Beijing; Referees: Gabor Kiszelly (HUN), Ahmet Erhan Tulga (TUR)
11 August 2008; 17:00	Report	Golda 4, Craig 3, Hayes 2	Goals	Gao 3, Teng 2, Sun Yu. 2, Sun H. 2	Ying Tung Natatorium, Beijing; Referees: Gabor Kiszelly (HUN), Ahmet Erhan Tulga (TUR)

13 August 2008; 17:00	Report	Russia	11–13	China	Ying Tung Natatorium, Beijing; Referees: Gaetan Turcotte (CAN), Torsten Bock (GER)
13 August 2008; 17:00	Report	Score by quarters: 2–3, 5–4, 3–1, 1–5			Ying Tung Natatorium, Beijing; Referees: Gaetan Turcotte (CAN), Torsten Bock (GER)
13 August 2008; 17:00	Report	Pantyulina 3, Vylegzhanina 2	Goals	Sun Yu. 4, Gao 2, Sun H. 2	Ying Tung Natatorium, Beijing; Referees: Gaetan Turcotte (CAN), Torsten Bock (GER)

15 August 2008; 17:00	Report	Italy	10–9	China	Ying Tung Natatorium, Beijing; Referees: Gabor Kiszelly (HUN), Boris Margeta (SLO)
15 August 2008; 17:00	Report	Score by quarters: 2–2, 4–2, 2–4, 2–1			Ying Tung Natatorium, Beijing; Referees: Gabor Kiszelly (HUN), Boris Margeta (SLO)
15 August 2008; 17:00	Report	Casanova 4, di Mario 3	Goals	Sun Ya. 3, Wang Yi 2, Qiao 2	Ying Tung Natatorium, Beijing; Referees: Gabor Kiszelly (HUN), Boris Margeta (SLO)

Quarterfinal

17 August 2008; 14:20	Report	China	11–12	Australia	Ying Tung Natatorium, Beijing; Referees: Decio Jr Patelli (BRA), Jaime Moliner Molins (ESP)
17 August 2008; 14:20	Report	Score by quarters: 4–4, 2–2, 2–4, 3–2			Ying Tung Natatorium, Beijing; Referees: Decio Jr Patelli (BRA), Jaime Moliner Molins (ESP)
17 August 2008; 14:20	Report	Ma 3, Sun H. 2	Goals	Gynther 5, Cuffe 2, M. Rippon 2	Ying Tung Natatorium, Beijing; Referees: Decio Jr Patelli (BRA), Jaime Moliner Molins (ESP)

Classification 5th–6th

19 August 2008; 13:00	Report	China	10–7	Italy	Ying Tung Natatorium, Beijing; Referees: Ahmet Erhan Tulga (TUR), Gaetan Turcotte (CAN)
19 August 2008; 13:00	Report	Score by quarters: 3–1, 2–3, 1–3, 4–0			Ying Tung Natatorium, Beijing; Referees: Ahmet Erhan Tulga (TUR), Gaetan Turcotte (CAN)
19 August 2008; 13:00	Report	Gao 4, Sun H. 2	Goals	di Mario 3, Zanchi 2	Ying Tung Natatorium, Beijing; Referees: Ahmet Erhan Tulga (TUR), Gaetan Turcotte (CAN)

== Weightlifting ==
China automatically qualifies for 6 men's and 4 women's places.

Men

Athlete	Event	Snatch		Clean & Jerk		Total	Rank
Athlete	Event	Result	Rank	Result	Rank	Total	Rank
Long Qingquan	−56 kg	132	1	160	1	292	1st place, gold medalist(s)
Zhang Xiangxiang	−62 kg	143	1	176	1	319	1st place, gold medalist(s)
Liao Hui	−69 kg	158	1	190	1	348	1st place, gold medalist(s)
Shi Zhiyong	−69 kg	152	4	—	—	152	DNF
Li Hongli	−77 kg	168	1	198	2	366	2nd place, silver medalist(s)
Lu Yong	−85 kg	180	2	214	1	394	1st place, gold medalist(s)

Women

Athlete	Event	Snatch		Clean & Jerk		Total	Rank
Athlete	Event	Result	Rank	Result	Rank	Total	Rank
Chen Xiexia	−48 kg	95	1	117 OR	1	212 OR	DSQ
Chen Yanqing	−58 kg	106	1	138 OR	1	244 OR	1st place, gold medalist(s)
Liu Chunhong	−69 kg	128 WR	1	158 WR	1	286 WR	DSQ
Cao Lei	−75 kg	128 OR	1	154 OR	1	282 OR	DSQ

== Wrestling ==
Key:

- VT - Victory by Fall.
- PP - Decision by Points - the loser with technical points.
- PO - Decision by Points - the loser without technical points.

Men's freestyle

Athlete	Event	Qualification	Round of 16	Quarterfinal	Semifinal	Repechage 1	Repechage 2	Final / BM	
Athlete	Event	Opposition Result	Opposition Result	Opposition Result	Opposition Result	Opposition Result	Opposition Result	Opposition Result	Rank
Qin He	−60 kg	Quintana (CUB); L 1–3 ^{PP}	Did not advance						13
Wang Qiang	−66 kg	Spiridonov (KAZ); L 1–3 ^{PP}	Did not advance						20
Si Riguleng	−74 kg	Fundora (CUB); L 1–3 ^{PP}	Did not advance						13
Wang Ying	−84 kg	Ketoev (RUS); L 1–3 ^{PP}	Did not advance						14
Liang Lei	−120 kg	Bartnicki (POL); W 3–1 ^{PP}	Mocco (USA); L 0–3 ^{PO}	Did not advance					10

Men's Greco-Roman

Athlete	Event	Qualification	Round of 16	Quarterfinal	Semifinal	Repechage 1	Repechage 2	Final / BM	
Athlete	Event	Opposition Result	Opposition Result	Opposition Result	Opposition Result	Opposition Result	Opposition Result	Opposition Result	Rank
Jiao Huafeng	−55 kg	Bye	Gogitadze (GEO); L 0–3 ^{PO}	Did not advance					17
Sheng Jiang	−60 kg	Rahimov (AZE); L 1–3 ^{PP}	Did not advance			Diaconu (ROU); W 3–1 ^{PP}	Nazaryan (BUL); W 3–1 ^{PP}	Tengizbayev (KAZ); L 1–3 ^{PP}	3rd place, bronze medalist(s)
Li Yanyan	−66 kg	Bye	Panait (ROU); W 3–1 ^{PP}	Bayakhmetov (KAZ); L 1–3 ^{PP}	Did not advance				10
Chang Yongxiang	−74 kg	Bye	Yanakiev (BUL); W 3–1 ^{PP}	Barrera (PER); W 3–1 ^{PP}	Mikhalovich (BLR); W 3–1 ^{PP}	Bye		Kvirkelia (GEO); L 0–3 ^{PO}	2nd place, silver medalist(s)
Ma Sanyi	−84 kg	Bye	Fodor (HUN); L 1–3 ^{PP}	Did not advance		Bye	Gadabadze (AZE); W 3–1 ^{PP}	Avluca (TUR); L 1–3 ^{PP}	5
Jiang Huachen	−96 kg	Bye	Bouguerra (ALG); W 3–0 ^{PO}	Wheeler (USA); L 1–3 ^{PP}	Did not advance				9
Liu Deli	−120 kg	Papadopoulos (GRE); W 3–1 ^{PP}	Byers (USA); L 1–3 ^{PP}	Did not advance					9

- Sheng Jiang originally finished fifth, but in November 2016, he was promoted to bronze due to disqualification of Vitaliy Rahimov.

Women's freestyle

Athlete	Event	Qualification	Round of 16	Quarterfinal	Semifinal	Repechage 1	Repechage 2	Final / BM	
Athlete	Event	Opposition Result	Opposition Result	Opposition Result	Opposition Result	Opposition Result	Opposition Result	Opposition Result	Rank
Li Xiaomei	−48 kg	Bye	Icho (JPN); L 1–3 ^{PP}	Did not advance					13
Xu Li	−55 kg	—N/a	Pavăl (ROU); W 3–0 ^{PO}	Smirnova (KAZ); W 3–1 ^{PP}	Rentería (COL); W 5–0 ^{VT}	Bye		Yoshida (JPN); L 0–5 ^{VT}	2nd place, silver medalist(s)
Xu Haiyan	−63 kg	Bye	Badrakh (MGL); W 3–1 ^{PP}	Dugrenier (CAN); L 1–3 ^{PP}	Did not advance				9
Wang Jiao	−72 kg	—N/a	Fransson (SWE); W 3–1 ^{PP}	Bernard (USA); W 3–1 ^{PP}	Hamaguchi (JPN); W 5–0 ^{VT}	Bye		Zlateva (BUL); W 5–0 ^{VT}	1st place, gold medalist(s)

== Media coverage ==
The main rights to Olympic coverage in China are held by China Central Television (CCTV). The 2008 Summer Olympics were the first ever to be broadcast in high definition (HDTV). Besides HDTV, CCTV will broadcast in digital cable TV. Live broadcasts will run on CCTV-1, CCTV-5 and CCTV-12, with re-run broadcasts on CCTV-2 and CCTV-7. CCTV.com, the only official Beijing Olympic Games mobile phone and Internet broadcast platform on the mainland and Macao, will broadcast 3,800 hours of the Olympic Games. CCTV will follow the homegrown mobile TV China Multimedia Mobile Broadcasting (CMMB) standard. China Telecom, China Netcom and Shanghai Media Group will broadcast using Internet Protocol television (IPTV) services. Radio coverage will be provided by China National Radio (CNR). China Mobile will also enable subscribers to catch live results and data.

Major Chinese Internet portals have signed coverage deals with CCTV.com to be Internet Content Services Sponsors: Sina.com, Netease.com, Tencent and Sohu.com. CCTV has joined with these online partners to run an interactive website offering streaming video broadcasts of events, which will be viewable only in China, and web profiles through which users can contact Olympic athletes. Officials expect 10m to 20m internet users to watch the Olympic Games in China via video streaming. 102m people had watched the games online in China, according to Timo Lumme, marketing director for the IOC. Phoenix TV broadcast the Opening Ceremony

== Kit sponsorship ==
China competed in all 28 Olympic sports. US sportswear company Nike has a sponsorship deal with 22 Chinese sports associations to provide outfits for those Olympic teams at the Beijing Games. Germany's Adidas has the endorsement rights for China's volleyball and football teams while Chinese company Li-Ning is the provider of the shooting, gymnastics, diving and table tennis teams. Yonex is the main sponsor of the China Badminton Team.

== See also ==
- China at the 2008 Summer Paralympics
- China at the Olympics
- Sports in China
- Project 119

Awards
Preceded by South Africa national rugby union team	Laureus World Team of the Year; 2009	Succeeded by Brawn Formula One Team
