= He Pan =

He Pan may refer to:

- He Pan (Jin dynasty) (何攀; 244–301), Chinese official and scholar of Shu Han and the Jin dynasty (266–420)
- He Pan (runner) (born 1988), Chinese female long distance runner
- Pan He (潘鹤), Chinese artist
