= Wu Ritubilige =

Chinese judoka

Wuritubilige (born October 5, 1987 in Ulanqab, Inner Mongolia) is a male Chinese judoka who represented China at the 2008 Summer Olympics in the Half lightweight (60–66 kg) event.

== Major performances ==
- 2007 National Champions Tournament and Olympic Selective Trials for Beijing 2008 – 1st 66 kg class
