= Shao Tingting =

Chinese basketball player

Shao Tingting (Chinese: 邵婷婷; pinyin: Shào Tíngtíng; born 9 February 1985 in Hubei) is a female Chinese basketball player who was part of the team that won the gold medal at the WCBA. She competed at the 2008 Summer Olympics in Beijing.
