= You Meihong =

Chinese swimmer

Personal information
- Born: January 31, 1993 (age 33) Guangzhou, Guangdong

Sport
- Sport: Swimming

You Meihong (born 31 January 1993) is a female Chinese swimmer who competed for Team China at the 2008 Summer Olympics.

== Major achievements ==
- 2008 China Open - 1st 800 m free
