= Hu Xianqiang =

Chinese sailor

Hu Xianqiang (simplified Chinese: 胡贤强; traditional Chinese: 胡賢強; pinyin: Hú Xiánqiáng, born 13 March 1983 in Qingdao, Shandong) is a male Chinese sports sailor who represented Team China at the 2008 Summer Olympics.

== Major performances ==
- 2004/2005 National Championships – 2nd/3rd 470 class long distance race;
- 2005 National Championships – 7th 470 class;
- 2006 National Championships – 1st 49er class/49er class long distance race
