= Hao Kexin =

Chinese handball player (born 1986)

Hao Kexin (born 15 January 1986) is a Chinese handball player who competed in the 2008 Summer Olympics.
