= Zhang Xing =

Chinese handball player (born 1986)

Zhang Xing (Chinese: 张星; pinyin: Zhāng Xīng; born June 13, 1986) is a Chinese handball player who competed in the 2008 Summer Olympics. He did not win a medal, nor did the team make it into the finals.
