= He Pan (runner) =

Chinese long-distance runner

Achievements and titles
- National finals: 2007 Chinese U20s; • 1500m, 3rd (bronze); • 5000m, 8th; 2008 Chinese Champs; • 5000m, 6th; 2009 Chinese Champs; • Half marathon, 12th

He Pan (Chinese: 何盼; born 1 May 1988, in Liaoning) is a female Chinese long-distance runner who specializes in the 5000 metres event. She was selected to represent her country at the 2008 Summer Olympics, but she did not compete. She won the 1500 m at the 6th National City Games of China in 2007, and finished 4th in the 5000 m.

== Personal bests ==
- 1500 metres - 4:11.22 min (2007)
- 5000 metres - 15:08.03 min (2007)
- Marathon - 2:39:29 hrs (2007)
