= Italy at the 2008 Summer Olympics =

- IOC code: ITA
- NOC: Italian National Olympic Committee
- Website: www.coni.it (in Italian)

in Beijing
- Competitors: 344 in 22 sports
- Flag bearers: Antonio Rossi (opening); Clemente Russo (closing)
- Medals Ranked 9th: Gold 8 Silver 9 Bronze 10 Total 27

Summer Olympics appearances (overview)
- 1896; 1900; 1904; 1908; 1912; 1920; 1924; 1928; 1932; 1936; 1948; 1952; 1956; 1960; 1964; 1968; 1972; 1976; 1980; 1984; 1988; 1992; 1996; 2000; 2004; 2008; 2012; 2016; 2020; 2024; 2028

Other related appearances
- 1906 Intercalated Games

Italy competed at the 2008 Summer Olympics, held in Beijing, China. The country sent a delegation of 344 athletes to compete.

== Medalists ==
Medal	Name	Sport	Event	Date
Gold	Matteo Tagliariol	Fencing	Men's individual épée	August 10
Gold	Giulia Quintavalle	Judo	Women's 57 kg	August 11
Gold	Valentina Vezzali	Fencing	Women's individual foil	August 11
Gold	Federica Pellegrini	Swimming	Women's 200 m freestyle	August 13
Gold	Chiara Cainero	Shooting	Women's skeet	August 14
Gold	Andrea Minguzzi	Wrestling	Men's Greco-Roman 84 kg	August 14
Gold	Alex Schwazer	Athletics	Men's 50 km walk	August 22
Gold	Roberto Cammarelle	Boxing	Super heavyweight	August 24
Silver	Giovanni Pellielo	Shooting	Men's trap	August 10
Silver	Ilario Di Buò; Marco Galiazzo; Mauro Nespoli	Archery	Men's team	August 11
Silver	Francesco D'Aniello	Shooting	Men's double trap	August 12
Silver	Alessia Filippi	Swimming	Women's 800 m freestyle	August 16
Silver	Luca Agamennoni; Simone Venier; Rossano Galtarossa; Simone Raineri	Rowing	Men's quadruple sculls	August 17
Silver	Alessandra Sensini	Sailing	Women's sailboard	August 20
Silver	Mauro Sarmiento	Taekwondo	Men's 80 kg	August 22
Silver	Josefa Idem	Canoeing	Women's K-1 500 m	August 23
Silver	Clemente Russo	Boxing	Heavyweight	August 23
Bronze	Tatiana Guderzo	Cycling	Women's road race	August 10
Bronze	Margherita Granbassi	Fencing	Women's individual foil	August 11
Bronze	Salvatore Sanzo	Fencing	Men's individual foil	August 13
Bronze	Matteo Tagliariol; Diego Confalonieri; Alfredo Rota; Stefano Carozzo	Fencing	Men's team épée	August 15
Bronze	Valentina Vezzali; Giovanna Trillini; Margherita Granbassi; Ilaria Salvatori	Fencing	Women's team foil	August 16
Bronze	Aldo Montano; Luigi Tarantino; Giampiero Pastore; Diego Occhiuzzi	Fencing	Men's team sabre	August 17
Bronze	Diego Romero	Sailing	Men's Laser class	August 19
Bronze	Elisa Rigaudo	Athletics	Women's 20 km walk	August 21
Bronze	Vincenzo Picardi	Boxing	Flyweight	August 22
Bronze	Andrea Facchin; Antonio Scaduto	Canoeing	Men's K-2 1000 m	August 22

Medals by sport
Sport	1st place, gold medalist(s)	2nd place, silver medalist(s)	3rd place, bronze medalist(s)	Total
Fencing	2	0	5	7
Shooting	1	2	0	3
Boxing	1	1	1	3
Swimming	1	1	0	2
Athletics	1	0	1	2
Canoeing	0	1	1	2
Sailing	0	1	1	2
Judo	1	0	0	1
Wrestling	1	0	0	1
Archery	0	1	0	1
Rowing	0	1	0	1
Taekwondo	0	1	0	1
Cycling	0	0	1	1
Total	8	9	10	27

== Archery ==
At the 2007 World Outdoor Target Championships, Italy's men's team placed fifth and its women's team placed fourth. This qualified the nation to send full teams of three men and three women to the Olympics.

Men

Athlete	Event	Ranking round		Round of 64	Round of 32	Round of 16	Quarterfinals	Semifinals	Final / BM	
Athlete	Event	Score	Seed	Opposition Score	Opposition Score	Opposition Score	Opposition Score	Opposition Score	Opposition Score	Rank
Ilario Di Buò	Individual	670	9	Bulíř (CZE) (56); W 111–100	Wunderle (USA) (41); L 108 (17)–108 (19)	Did not advance				
Marco Galiazzo	Individual	667	12	Dall (DEN) (53); W 114–97	Wills (GBR) (21); L 110–109	Did not advance				
Mauro Nespoli	Individual	649	44	Wills (GBR) (21); L 99–103	Did not advance					
Ilario Di Buò; Marco Galiazzo; Mauro Nespoli	Team	1986	6	—N/a		Canada (11); W 219–217	Malaysia (3); W 218–213	Ukraine (2); W 223–221	South Korea (1); L 227–225	2nd place, silver medalist(s)

Women

Athlete	Event	Ranking round		Round of 64	Round of 32	Round of 16	Quarterfinals	Semifinals	Final / BM	
Athlete	Event	Score	Seed	Opposition Score	Opposition Score	Opposition Score	Opposition Score	Opposition Score	Opposition Score	Rank
Pia Lionetti	Individual	613	51	Schuh (FRA) (14); L 107–112	Did not advance					
Elena Tonetta	Individual	595	55	Rendón (COL) (10); L 106 (9)–106 (10)	Did not advance					
Natalia Valeeva	Individual	634	30	Bannova (KAZ) (35); W 107–105	Joo H-J (KOR) (3); L 108–110	Did not advance				
Pia Lionetti; Elena Tonetta; Natalia Valeeva	Team	1842	9	—N/a		Chinese Taipei (8); W 215–211	South Korea (1); L 231–217	Did not advance		

== Athletics ==
Key

- Note–Ranks given for track events are within the athlete's heat only
- Q = Qualified for the next round
- q = Qualified for the next round as a fastest loser or, in field events, by position without achieving the qualifying target
- NR = National record
- N/A = Round not applicable for the event
- Bye = Athlete not required to compete in round

Men
Track & road events

Athlete	Event	Heat		Quarterfinal		Semifinal		Final	
Athlete	Event	Result	Rank	Result	Rank	Result	Rank	Result	Rank
Simone Collio	100 m	10.32	3 Q	10.33	7	Did not advance			
Fabio Cerutti	100 m	10.49	5	Did not advance					
Claudio Licciardello	400 m	45.25	3 Q	—N/a		45.64	8	Did not advance	
Christian Obrist	1500 m	3:35.91	4 Q	—N/a		3:37.47	4 Q	3:39.87	11
Matteo Villani	3000 m steeplechase	DNF		—N/a				Did not advance	
Fabio Cerutti; Simone Collio; Emanuele Di Gregorio; Jacques Riparelli	4 × 100 m relay	DSQ		—N/a				Did not advance	
Ottaviano Andriani	Marathon	—N/a						2:16:10	23
Stefano Baldini	Marathon	—N/a						2:13:25	12
Ruggero Pertile	Marathon	—N/a						2:13:39	15
Ivano Brugnetti	20 km walk	—N/a						1:19:51	5
Jean-Jacques Nkouloukidi	20 km walk	—N/a						1:26:53	37
Giorgio Rubino	20 km walk	—N/a						1:22:11	18
Diego Cafagna	50 km walk	—N/a						DSQ	
Marco De Luca	50 km walk	—N/a						3:54:47	19
Alex Schwazer	50 km walk	—N/a						3:37:09 OR	1st place, gold medalist(s)

Field events

Athlete	Event	Qualification		Final	
Athlete	Event	Distance	Position	Distance	Position
Andrew Howe	Long jump	7.81	20	Did not advance	
Fabrizio Donato	Triple jump	16.70	21	Did not advance	
Andrea Bettinelli	High jump	2.25	16	Did not advance	
Filippo Campioli	High jump	2.25	=9 Q	2.20	=10
Alessandro Talotti	High jump	2.20	19	Did not advance	
Giuseppe Gibilisco	Pole vault	5.65	13 q	NM	—
Hannes Kirchler	Discus throw	56.44	32	Did not advance	
Marco Lingua	Hammer throw	NM	—	Did not advance	
Nicola Vizzoni	Hammer throw	75.01	13	Did not advance	

Women
Track & road events

Athlete	Event	Heat		Quarterfinal		Semifinal		Final	
Athlete	Event	Result	Rank	Result	Rank	Result	Rank	Result	Rank
Anita Pistone	100 m	11.43	2 Q	11.56	6	Did not advance			
Vincenza Calì	200 m	23.44	6 q	23.56	7	Did not advance			
Libania Grenot	400 m	50.87 NR	1 Q	—N/a		50.83 NR	5	Did not advance	
Elisa Cusma	800 m	2:00.24	5 q	—N/a		1:59.52	5	Did not advance	
Silvia Weissteiner	5000 m	15:23.45	10	—N/a				Did not advance	
Micol Cattanéo	100 m hurdles	13.13	5	—N/a		Did not advance			
Elena Romagnolo	3000 m steeplechase	9:27.48	5 q	—N/a				9:30.04	11
Bruna Genovese	Marathon	—N/a						2:31:31	17
Anna Incerti	Marathon	—N/a						2:30:55	14
Vincenza Sicari	Marathon	—N/a						2:33:31	29
Elisa Rigaudo	20 km walk	—N/a						1:27:12	3rd place, bronze medalist(s)
Audrey Alloh; Giulia Arcioni; Vincenza Calì; Anita Pistone	4 × 100 m relay	DSQ		—N/a				Did not advance	

Field events

Athlete	Event	Qualification		Final	
Athlete	Event	Distance	Position	Distance	Position
Magdelín Martínez	Triple jump	13.70	21	Did not advance	
Antonietta Di Martino	High jump	1.93	=5 q	1.93	=10
Assunta Legnante	Shot put	18.74	19	Did not advance	
Chiara Rosa	Shot put	18.74	9 Q	18.22	13
Zahra Bani	Javelin throw	NM	—	Did not advance	
Clarissa Claretti	Hammer throw	71.82	5 Q	71.33	7
Silvia Salis	Hammer throw	62.28	22	Did not advance	

== Badminton ==
Athlete	Event	Round of 64	Round of 32	Round of 16	Quarterfinal	Semifinal	Final / BM	
Athlete	Event	Opposition Score	Opposition Score	Opposition Score	Opposition Score	Opposition Score	Opposition Score	Rank
Agnese Allegrini	Women's singles	Griga (UKR); L 15–21, 11–21	Did not advance					

== Boxing ==
Athlete	Event	Round of 32	Round of 16	Quarterfinals	Semifinals	Final	
Athlete	Event	Opposition Result	Opposition Result	Opposition Result	Opposition Result	Opposition Result	Rank
Vincenzo Picardi	Flyweight	Chiyanika (ZAM); W 10–3	Payano (DOM); W 8–4	Cherif (TUN); W 7–5	Jongjohor (THA); L 1–7	Did not advance	3rd place, bronze medalist(s)
Vittorio Parrinello	Bantamweight	Bye	Petchkoom (THA); L 1–12	Did not advance			
Alessio di Savino	Featherweight	Williams (USA); L 1–9	Did not advance				
Domenico Valentino	Lightweight	Tamsamani (MAR); W 15–4	Ugás (CUB); L 2–10	Did not advance			
Clemente Russo	Heavyweight	—N/a	Zuyeu (BLR); W 7–1	Usyk (UKR); W 7–4	Wilder (USA); W 7–1	Chakhkiev (RUS); L 2–4	2nd place, silver medalist(s)
Roberto Cammarelle	Super heavyweight	—N/a	Tomasović (CRO); W 13–1	Rivas (COL); W 9–5	Price (GBR); W RSC	Zhang Zl (CHN); W RSC	1st place, gold medalist(s)

== Canoeing ==
=== Slalom ===
Athlete	Event	Preliminary						Semifinal		Final			
Athlete	Event	Run 1	Rank	Run 2	Rank	Total	Rank	Time	Rank	Time	Rank	Total	Rank
Daniele Molmenti	Men's K-1	85.13	5	83.46	3	168.59	3 Q	88.56	8 Q	142.37	10	230.93	10
Andrea Benetti; Erik Masoero	Men's C-2	100.08	9	102.20	9	202.28	8 Q	103.64	6 Q	100.48	5	204.12	5
Cristina Giai Pron	Women's K-1	102.75	9	100.95	9	203.70	9 Q	104.52	5 Q	251.26	10	355.78	10

=== Sprint ===
Men

Athlete	Event	Heats		Semifinals		Final	
Athlete	Event	Time	Rank	Time	Rank	Time	Rank
Michele Zerial	K-1 500 m	1:36.950	3 QS	1:42.931	4	Did not advance	
Andrea Facchin; Antonio Scaduto	K-2 500 m	1:30.240	3 QF	Bye		1:31.934	9
Andrea Facchin; Antonio Scaduto	K-2 1000 m	3:18.897	3 QF	Bye		3:14.750	3rd place, bronze medalist(s)
Franco Benedini; Luca Piemonte; Alberto Ricchetti; Antonio Rossi	K-4 1000 m	2:58.627	2 QF	Bye		2:57.626	4

Women

Athlete	Event	Heats		Semifinals		Final	
Athlete	Event	Time	Rank	Time	Rank	Time	Rank
Josefa Idem	K-1 500 m	1:48.864	1 QF	Bye		1:50.677	2nd place, silver medalist(s)
Stefania Cicali; Fabiana Sgroi	K-2 500 m	1:47.018	6 QS	1:46.163	6	Did not advance	
Stefania Cicali; Alice Fagioli; Alessandra Galiotto; Fabiana Sgroi	K-4 500 m	1:37.436	4 QS	1:37.887	3 Q	1:36.770	8

Qualification Legend: QS = Qualify to semi-final; QF = Qualify directly to final

== Cycling ==
=== Road ===
Davide Rebellin won the silver medal in the men's road race, but was stripped of that medal, as he tested positive for CERA after the event.

Men

Athlete	Event	Time	Rank
Paolo Bettini	Road race	6:24:24	18
Marzio Bruseghin	Road race	6:34:26	63
Marzio Bruseghin	Time trial	1:06:20	22
Vincenzo Nibali	Road race	Did not finish	
Vincenzo Nibali	Time trial	1:05:36	15
Franco Pellizotti	Road race	6:31:06	50
Davide Rebellin	Road race	~~6:23:49~~	DSQ

Women

Athlete	Event	Time	Rank
Noemi Cantele	Road race	3:32:45	15
Vera Carrara	Road race	Did not finish	
Tatiana Guderzo	Road race	3:32:24	3rd place, bronze medalist(s)
Tatiana Guderzo	Time trial	36:37.97	12

=== Track ===
Italy had qualified places for the men's keirin, sprint, madison and points race.

Sprint

Athlete	Event	Qualification		Round 1	Round 2	Repechage 2	Quarterfinals	Semifinals	Final	
Athlete	Event	Time Speed (km/h)	Rank	Opposition Time Speed (km/h)	Opposition Time Speed (km/h)	Opposition Time Speed (km/h)	Opposition Time Speed (km/h)	Opposition Time Speed (km/h)	Opposition Time Speed (km/h)	Rank
Roberto Chiappa	Men's sprint	10.314; 69.808	8 Q	Watanabe (JPN); W 10.786; 66.753	Bourgain (FRA); L	Awang (MAS); Nimke (GER); L	Did not advance		9th place final Nimke (GER); Bayley (AUS); Watanabe (JPN); L	10

Keirin

Athlete	Event	1st round	Repechage	2nd round	Finals
Athlete	Event	Rank	Rank	Rank	Rank
Roberto Chiappa	Men's keirin	6 R	5	Did not advance	

Omnium

Athlete	Event	Points	Laps	Rank
Angelo Ciccone	Men's points race	8	0	13
Vera Carrara	Women's points race	1	0	14
Angelo Ciccone; Fabio Masotti	Men's madison	0	−3	14

=== Mountain biking ===
Athlete	Event	Time	Rank
Marco Aurelio Fontana	Men's cross-country	1:59:59	5
Yader Zoli	Men's cross-country	LAP (1 lap)	30
Eva Lechner	Women's cross-country	1:58:22	16

=== BMX ===
Athlete	Event	Seeding		Quarterfinals		Semifinals		Final	
Athlete	Event	Result	Rank	Points	Rank	Points	Rank	Result	Rank
Manuel de Vecchi	Men's BMX	36.351	10	11	3 Q	20	8	Did not advance	

== Diving ==
Men

Athlete	Events	Preliminaries		Semifinals		Final	
Athlete	Events	Points	Rank	Points	Rank	Points	Rank
Nicola Marconi	3 m springboard	430.90	18 Q	444.55	14	Did not advance	
Tommaso Marconi	3 m springboard	360.15	28	Did not advance			
Francesco Dell'Uomo	10 m platform	388.80	25	Did not advance			

Women

Athlete	Events	Preliminaries		Semifinals		Final	
Athlete	Events	Points	Rank	Points	Rank	Points	Rank
Tania Cagnotto	3 m springboard	332.90	6 Q	332.40	5 Q	349.20	5
Maria Marconi	3 m springboard	286.10	14 Q	277.50	17	Did not advance	
Tania Cagnotto	10 m platform	328.30	11 Q	296.60	13	Did not advance	
Valentina Marocchi	10 m platform	313.05	15 Q	283.15	15	Did not advance	
Noemi Batki; Francesca Dallapè	3 m synchronized springboard	—N/a				296.70	6

== Equestrian ==
=== Dressage ===
Athlete	Horse	Event	Grand Prix		Grand Prix Special		Grand Prix Freestyle		Overall	
Athlete	Horse	Event	Score	Rank	Score	Rank	Score	Rank	Score	Rank
Pierluigi Sangiorgi	Flourian	Individual	61.875	37	Did not advance					

=== Eventing ===
Athlete	Horse	Event	Dressage		Cross-country			Jumping						Total	
Athlete	Horse	Event	Dressage		Cross-country			Qualifier			Final			Total	
Athlete	Horse	Event	Penalties	Rank	Penalties	Total	Rank	Penalties	Total	Rank	Penalties	Total	Rank	Penalties	Rank
Susanna Bordone	Ava	Individual	37.80	8	28.80	66.60	21	20.00	86.60	26 Q	14.00	100.60	23	100.60	23
Stefano Brecciaroli	Cappa Hill	Individual	50.00 #	33	62.00	112.00 #	46	4.00	116.00 #	41	Did not advance			116.00	40
Fabio Magni	Southern King V	Individual	49.60	31	70.00	119.60 #	50	0.00	119.60 #	42	Did not advance			119.60	41
Vittoria Panizzon	Rock Model	Individual	50.60 #	35	18.40	69.00	25	0.00	69.00	17 Q	8.00	77.00	16	77.00	16
Roberto Rotatori	Irham De Viages	Individual	40.00	12	22.80	62.80	17	28.00	90.80	30	Did not advance			90.80	29
Susanna Bordone; Stefano Brecciaroli; Fabio Magni; Vittoria Panizzon; Roberto Rotatori	See above	Team	127.40	5	71.00	198.40	4	48.00	246.40	6	—N/a			246.40	6

# – Indicates that points do not count in team total

== Fencing ==
Men

Athlete	Event	Round of 64	Round of 32	Round of 16	Quarterfinal	Semifinal	Final / BM	
Athlete	Event	Opposition Score	Opposition Score	Opposition Score	Opposition Score	Opposition Score	Opposition Score	Rank
Diego Confalonieri	Individual épée	Bye	Motyka (POL); W 15–10	Imre (HUN); W 15–9	Abajo (ESP); L 13–14	Did not advance		
Alfredo Rota	Individual épée	Bye	Boczko (HUN); L 10–11	Did not advance				
Matteo Tagliariol	Individual épée	Bye	Torkildsen (NOR); W 15–10	Robeiri (FRA); W 15–11	Verwijlen (NED); W 15–11	Abajo (ESP); W 15–12	Jeannet (FRA); W 15–9	1st place, gold medalist(s)
Stefano Carozzo; Diego Confalonieri; Alfredo Rota; Matteo Tagliariol	Team épée	—N/a		Bye	South Korea; W 45–37	France; L 39–45	China; W 45–35	3rd place, bronze medalist(s)
Andrea Cassarà	Individual foil	—N/a	Bye	Schlosser (AUT); W 15–8	Zhu J (CHN); L 14–15	Did not advance		
Salvatore Sanzo	Individual foil	—N/a	Bye	McGuire (CAN); W 15–3	Le Péchoux (FRA); W 10–9	Ota (JPN); L 14–15	Zhu J (CHN); W 15–14	3rd place, bronze medalist(s)
Aldo Montano	Individual sabre	Bye	Beaudry (CAN); W 15–4	Pina (ESP); L 14–15	Did not advance			
Diego Occhiuzzi	Individual sabre	Bye	Pina (ESP); L 9–15	Did not advance				
Luigi Tarantino	Individual sabre	Bye	Agresta (BRA); W 15–8	Sanson (FRA); W 15–7	Zhong M (CHN); L 13–15	Did not advance		
Aldo Montano; Diego Occhiuzzi; Giampiero Pastore; Luigi Tarantino	Team sabre	—N/a			Belarus; W 45–39	France; L 41–45	Russia; W 45–44	3rd place, bronze medalist(s)

Women

Athlete	Event	Round of 64	Round of 32	Round of 16	Quarterfinal	Semifinal	Final / BM	
Athlete	Event	Opposition Score	Opposition Score	Opposition Score	Opposition Score	Opposition Score	Opposition Score	Rank
Margherita Granbassi	Individual foil	Bye	Angad-Gaur (NED); W 11–6	Nikichina (RUS); W 11–4	Lamonova (RUS); W 12–7	Vezzali (ITA); L 3–12	Trillini (ITA); W 15–12	3rd place, bronze medalist(s)
Giovanna Trillini	Individual foil	Bye	Compañy (CUB); W 15–7	Shanaeva (RUS); W 15–3	Wächter (GER); W 15–8	Nam H-H (KOR); L 10–15	Granbassi (ITA); L 12–15	4
Valentina Vezzali	Individual foil	Bye	Mroczkiewicz (POL); W 15–3	Zhang L (CHN); W 10–7	Knapek (HUN); W 15–3	Granbassi (ITA); W 12–3	Nam H-H (KOR); W 6–5	1st place, gold medalist(s)
Margherita Granbassi; Ilaria Salvatori; Giovanna Trillini; Valentina Vezzali	Team foil	—N/a			China; W 37–24	Russia; L 21–22	Hungary; W 32–23	3rd place, bronze medalist(s)
Ilaria Bianco	Individual sabre	Bye	Huang Hy (CHN); W 15–12	Velikaya (RUS); L 6–15	Did not advance			
Gioia Marzocca	Individual sabre	Bye	Kharlan (UKR); L 8–15	Did not advance				

== Football (soccer) ==
=== Men's tournament ===
Roster

The following is the Italy squad in the men's football tournament of the 2008 Summer Olympics.

Head coach: Pierluigi Casiraghi

No.	Pos.	Player	Date of birth (age)	Caps	Goals	Club
1	GK	Emiliano Viviano	1 December 1985 (aged 22)	30	0	(Italian Football Federation) Brescia
2	DF	Marco Motta	14 May 1986 (aged 22)	52	6	(Italian Football Federation) Udinese
3	DF	Paolo De Ceglie	17 September 1986 (aged 21)	13	2	(Italian Football Federation) Juventus
4	MF	Antonio Nocerino (c)	9 April 1985 (aged 23)	39	0	(Italian Football Federation) Palermo
5	MF	Luca Cigarini	20 June 1986 (aged 22)	21	1	(Italian Football Federation) Parma
6	DF	Domenico Criscito	30 December 1986 (aged 21)	34	3	(Italian Football Federation) Genoa
7	MF	Riccardo Montolivo	18 January 1985 (aged 23)	35	4	(Italian Football Federation) Fiorentina
8	MF	Claudio Marchisio	19 January 1986 (aged 22)	9	1	(Italian Football Federation) Juventus
9	FW	Tommaso Rocchi*	19 September 1977 (aged 30)	18	7	(Italian Football Federation) Lazio
10	FW	Sebastian Giovinco	26 January 1987 (aged 21)	37	7	(Italian Football Federation) Juventus
11	FW	Giuseppe Rossi	1 February 1987 (aged 21)	38	15	(Royal Spanish Football Federation) Villarreal
12	MF	Daniele Dessena	10 May 1987 (aged 21)	22	6	(Italian Football Federation) Sampdoria
13	DF	Andrea Coda	25 April 1985 (aged 23)	44	1	(Italian Football Federation) Udinese
14	FW	Robert Acquafresca	11 September 1987 (aged 20)	22	8	(Italian Football Federation) Cagliari
15	DF	Salvatore Bocchetti	30 November 1986 (aged 21)	6	0	(Italian Football Federation) Genoa
16	DF	Lorenzo De Silvestri	23 May 1988 (aged 20)	50	23	(Italian Football Federation) Lazio
17	MF	Ignazio Abate	12 November 1986 (aged 21)	17	2	(Italian Football Federation) Torino
18	GK	Andrea Consigli	27 January 1987 (aged 21)	41	0	(Italian Football Federation) Atalanta
20	MF	Antonio Candreva (Note: Replaces Claudio Marchisio who was injured during the competition)	28 February 1987 (aged 21)	28	1	(Italian Football Federation) Livorno
21	FW	Andrea Russotto (Note: Replaces Tommaso Rocchi who was injured during the competition)	25 March 1988 (aged 20)	44	11	(Italian Football Federation) Napoli

* Over-aged player.

Notes

Group play

Pos	Team	Pld	W	D	L	GF	GA	GD	Pts	Qualification
1	Italy	3	2	1	0	6	0	+6	7	Qualified for the quarterfinals
2	Cameroon	3	1	2	0	2	1	+1	5	Qualified for the quarterfinals
3	South Korea	3	1	1	1	2	4	−2	4	
4	Honduras	3	0	0	3	0	5	−5	0	

7 August 2008
17:00

Honduras	0–3	Italy
	Report	Giovinco 41'; Rossi 45' (pen.); Acquafresca 52' (pen.)

Qinhuangdao Olympic Sports Center Stadium, Qinhuangdao
Attendance: 21,680
Referee: Damir Skomina (Slovenia)
10 August 2008
19:45

Italy	3–0	South Korea
Rossi 15'; Rocchi 32'; Montolivo 90'	Report

Qinhuangdao Olympic Sports Center Stadium, Qinhuangdao
Attendance: 29,455
Referee: Thomas Einwaller (Austria)
13 August 2008
17:00

Cameroon	0–0	Italy
	Report

Tianjin Olympic Center Stadium, Tianjin
Attendance: 47,307
Referee: Martín Vázquez (Uruguay)

Quarterfinal

16 August 2008
18:00

Italy	2–3	Belgium
Rossi 18' (pen.), 74' (pen.)	Report	Dembélé 23', 79'; Mirallas 45+2'

Beijing Workers' Stadium, Beijing
Attendance: 50,802
Referee: Héctor Baldassi (Argentina)

== Gymnastics ==
=== Artistic ===
Men
Team

Athlete	Event	Qualification								Final							
Athlete	Event	Apparatus						Total	Rank	Apparatus						Total	Rank
Athlete	Event	F	PH	R	V	PB	HB	Total	Rank	F	PH	R	V	PB	HB	Total	Rank
Matteo Angioletti	Team	14.250	—N/a	15.625	16.500	—N/a	13.575	—N/a		Did not advance							
Alberto Busnari	Team	13.525	15.125	—N/a		14.625	14.375	—N/a		Did not advance							
Igor Cassina	Team	—N/a	13.800	—N/a		14.125	16.000 Q	—N/a		Did not advance							
Andrea Coppolino	Team	14.025	12.925	15.975 Q	14.825	13.675	—N/a			Did not advance							
Matteo Morandi	Team	14.175	13.700	16.025 Q	16.100	13.725	13.850	87.575	31	Did not advance							
Enrico Pozzo	Team	14.800	14.325	14.250	15.700	14.750	14.850	88.675	26 Q	Did not advance							
Total	Team	63.125	57.250	56.950	61.875	57.225	59.075	355.500	12	Did not advance							

Individual finals

Athlete	Event	Apparatus						Total	Rank
Athlete	Event	F	PH	R	V	PB	HB	Total	Rank
Igor Cassina	Horizontal bar	—N/a					15.675	15.675	4
Andrea Coppolino	Rings	—N/a		16.225	—N/a			16.225	4
Matteo Morandi	Rings	—N/a		16.200	—N/a			16.200	6
Enrico Pozzo	All-around	15.250	14.625	13.850	15.600	14.600	15.450	89.375	19

Women
Team

Athlete	Event	Qualification						Final					
Athlete	Event	Apparatus				Total	Rank	Apparatus				Total	Rank
Athlete	Event	F	V	UB	BB	Total	Rank	F	V	UB	BB	Total	Rank
Francesca Benolli	Team	13.600	15.075	14.475	13.850	57.000	35	Did not advance					
Monica Bergamelli	Team	—N/a	13.900	—N/a	14.350	—N/a		Did not advance					
Vanessa Ferrari	Team	14.650	14.825	14.050	14.775	58.300	21 Q	Did not advance					
Carlotta Giovannini	Team	13.575	15.100 Q	14.475	13.900	57.050	34	Did not advance					
Federica Macrì	Team	13.800	—N/a	13.550	—N/a			Did not advance					
Lia Parolari	Team	14.575	14.075	14.375	15.175	58.200	23 Q	Did not advance					
Total	Team	56.625	59.075	57.375	58.200	231.275	10	Did not advance					

Individual finals

Athlete	Event	Apparatus				Total	Rank
Athlete	Event	F	V	UB	BB	Total	Rank
Vanessa Ferrari	All-around	13.950	14.700	15.200	15.600	59.450	11
Carlotta Giovannini	Vault	—N/a	14.550	—N/a		14.550	6
Lia Parolari	All-around	14.500	13.950	15.350	15.125	58.925	14

=== Rhythmic ===
Athlete	Event	Qualification				Final			
Athlete	Event	5 ropes	3 hoops 2 clubs	Total	Rank	5 ropes	3 hoops 2 clubs	Total	Rank
Elisa Blanchi; Fabrizia D'Ottavio; Marinella Falca; Daniela Masseroni; Elisa Santoni; Anzhelika Savrayuk	Team	17.150	17.375	34.525	4 Q	17.000	17.425	34.425	4

=== Trampoline ===
Athlete	Event	Qualification		Final	
Athlete	Event	Score	Rank	Score	Rank
Flavio Cannone	Men's	66.50	14	Did not advance	

== Judo ==
Men

Athlete	Event	Preliminary	Round of 32	Round of 16	Quarterfinals	Semifinals	Repechage 1	Repechage 2	Repechage 3	Final / BM	
Athlete	Event	Opposition Result	Opposition Result	Opposition Result	Opposition Result	Opposition Result	Opposition Result	Opposition Result	Opposition Result	Opposition Result	Rank
Giovanni Casale	−66 kg	Bye	Novoa (CHI); W 1000–0000	Pak C-M (PRK); L 0001–0010	Did not advance		Nurmuhammedow (TKM); W 0012–0000	Dias (POR); W 1001–0001	Gadanov (RUS); L 0010–1002	Did not advance	
Giuseppe Maddaloni	−81 kg	Bye	Brenes (PUR); W 0020–0001	Elmont (NED); L 0000–1001	Did not advance		Nyamkhüü (MGL); L 0000–1000	Did not advance			
Roberto Meloni	−90 kg	—N/a	Borodavko (LAT); W 0100–0010	Dafreville (FRA); L 0000–0010	Did not advance		González (CUB); W 1001–0001	Santos (BRA); L 0000–1000	Did not advance		
Paolo Bianchessi	+100 kg	Bye	Ishii (JPN); L 0000–1011	Did not advance			El Shehaby (EGY); W 0010–0000	Tmenov (RUS); L 0000–0010	Did not advance		

Women

Athlete	Event	Round of 32	Round of 16	Quarterfinals	Semifinals	Repechage 1	Repechage 2	Repechage 3	Final / BM	
Athlete	Event	Opposition Result	Opposition Result	Opposition Result	Opposition Result	Opposition Result	Opposition Result	Opposition Result	Opposition Result	Rank
Giulia Quintavalle	−57 kg	Bönisch (GER); W 0101–0001	Khishigbat (MGL); W 1010–0001	Harel (FRA); W 0010–0001	Pekli (AUS); W 0010–0002	Bye			Gravenstijn (NED); W 0011–0001	1st place, gold medalist(s)
Ylenia Scapin	−70 kg	Bye	Jacques (BEL); W 0010–0000	Hernández (CUB); L 0000–1000	Did not advance	Bye	Alvear (COL); L 0010–1000	Did not advance		
Lucia Morico	−78 kg	Bye	Nakazawa (JPN); W 0010–0001	San Miguel (ESP); L 0011–0220	Did not advance	Bye	Silva (BRA); L 0000–1101	Did not advance		
Michela Torrenti	+78 kg	Shepherd (AUS); L 0000–0001	Did not advance							

== Modern pentathlon ==
Athlete	Event	Shooting (10 m air pistol)			Fencing (épée one touch)			Swimming (200 m freestyle)			Riding (show jumping)			Running (3000 m)			Total points	Final rank
Athlete	Event	Points	Rank	MP Points	Results	Rank	MP points	Time	Rank	MP points	Penalties	Rank	MP points	Time	Rank	MP Points	Total points	Final rank
Nicola Benedetti	Men's	183	14	1132	16–19	21	784	2:15.10	34	1180	144	16	1056	9:12.77	3	1192	5344	14
Andrea Valentini	Men's	182	16	1120	18–17	13	832	2:11.70	33	1220	228	22	972	9:24.82	12	1144	5288	17
Sara Bertoli	Women's	174	27	1024	13–22	=29	712	2:21.92	23	1220	328	34	872	10:48.46	17	1128	4956	32
Claudia Corsini	Women's	184	8	1144	14–21	28	736	2:19.22	18	1252	84	17	1116	10:40.01	12	1160	5408	14

== Rowing ==
Men

Athlete	Event	Heats		Repechage		Semifinals		Final	
Athlete	Event	Time	Rank	Time	Rank	Time	Rank	Time	Rank
Giuseppe De Vita; Raffaello Leonardo	Pair	6:51:01	2 SA/B	Bye		6:47:30	5 FB	7:04:91	11
Elia Luini; Marcello Miani	Lightweight double sculls	6:16:16	1 SA/B	Bye		6:31:16	2 FA	6:16:15	4
Lorenzo Carboncini; Carlo Mornati; Niccolò Mornati; Alessio Sartori	Four	6:02:84	2 SA/B	Bye		6:05:21	6 FB	6:08:77	11
Luca Agamennoni; Rossano Galtarossa; Simone Raineri; Simone Venier	Quadruple sculls	5:36:42	2 SA/B	Bye		5:51:20	1 FA	5:43:57	2nd place, silver medalist(s)
Catello Amarante; Salvatore Amitrano; Bruno Mascarenhas; Jiri Vlcek	Lightweight four	5:54:12	3 SA/B	Bye		6:14:73	5 FB	6:03:12	7

Women

Athlete	Event	Heats		Repechage		Quarterfinals		Semifinals		Final	
Athlete	Event	Time	Rank	Time	Rank	Time	Rank	Time	Rank	Time	Rank
Gabriella Bascelli	Single sculls	7:43:67	1 QF	—N/a		7:36:68	3 SA/B	7:42:10	4 FB	7:48:91	8
Elisabetta Sancassani; Laura Schiavone	Double sculls	7:30:25	5 R	7:08:00	4 FB	—N/a				7:29:22	10

Qualification Legend: FA=Final A (medal); FB=Final B (non-medal); FC=Final C (non-medal); FD=Final D (non-medal); FE=Final E (non-medal); FF=Final F (non-medal); SA/B=Semifinals A/B; SC/D=Semifinals C/D; SE/F=Semifinals E/F; QF=Quarterfinals; R=Repechage

== Sailing ==
Men

Athlete	Event	Race											Net points	Final rank
Athlete	Event	1	2	3	4	5	6	7	8	9	10	M*	Net points	Final rank
Fabian Heidegger	RS:X	14	12	8	17	18	13	18	~~24~~	21	17	EL	138	20
Diego Romero	Laser	6	3	5	~~36~~	10	15	11	9	10	CAN	6	75	3rd place, bronze medalist(s)
Andrea Trani; Gabria Zandona'	470	10	4	7	7	2	21	19	6	~~29~~	5	10	91	6
Diego Negri; Luigi Viale	Star	~~13~~	8	12	7	11	7	7	6	13	5	16	92	10

Women

Athlete	Event	Race											Net points	Final rank
Athlete	Event	1	2	3	4	5	6	7	8	9	10	M*	Net points	Final rank
Alessandra Sensini	RS:X	6	2	9	1	~~28~~	3	2	2	5	8	2	40	2nd place, silver medalist(s)
Larissa Nevierov	Laser Radial	17	15	22	9	11	13	16	~~24~~	21	CAN	EL	124	19
Giulia Conti; Giovanna Micol	470	14	7	6	3	6	11	4	~~19~~	12	6	6	75	5
Chiara Calligaris; Giulia Pignolo; Francesca Scognamillo	Yngling	~~15~~	14	13	9	8	9	7	14	CAN	CAN	EL	74	15

Open

Athlete	Event	Race																Net points	Final rank
Athlete	Event	1	2	3	4	5	6	7	8	9	10	11	12	13	14	15	M*	Net points	Final rank
Giorgio Poggi	Finn	17	7	14	~~21~~	6	12	9	9	CAN	CAN	—N/a					EL	74	11
Gianfranco Sibello; Pietro Sibello	49er	3	9	1	1	6	9	3	8	12	~~17~~	3	3	CAN	CAN	CAN	8	66	4
Edoardo Bianchi; Francesco Marcolini	Tornado	~~15~~	9	4	2	8	4	6	11	8	6	—N/a					16	74	7

M = Medal race; EL = Eliminated – did not advance into the medal race; CAN = Race cancelled

== Shooting ==
Men

Athlete	Event	Qualification		Final	
Athlete	Event	Points	Rank	Points	Rank
Mauro Badaracchi	10 m air pistol	571	40	Did not advance	
Andrea Benelli	Skeet	113	24	Did not advance	
Francesco Bruno	50 m pistol	554	19	Did not advance	
Niccolò Campriani	10 m air rifle	594	12	Did not advance	
Niccolò Campriani	50 m rifle prone	588	38	Did not advance	
Niccolò Campriani	50 m rifle 3 positions	1153	39	Did not advance	
Francesco D'Aniello	Double trap	141	2 Q	187	2nd place, silver medalist(s)
Marco De Nicolo	10 m air rifle	592	20	Did not advance	
Marco De Nicolo	50 m rifle prone	593	15	Did not advance	
Marco De Nicolo	50 m rifle 3 positions	1169	9	Did not advance	
Daniele Di Spigno	Double trap	135	10	Did not advance	
Vigilio Fait	10 m air pistol	580	9	Did not advance	
Vigilio Fait	50 m pistol	551	28	Did not advance	
Ennio Falco	Skeet	117	14	Did not advance	
Erminio Frasca	Trap	120	3 Q	140 S/O 1	6
Giovanni Pellielo	Trap	120	4 Q	143	2nd place, silver medalist(s)

Women

Athlete	Event	Qualification		Final	
Athlete	Event	Points	Rank	Points	Rank
Chiara Cainero	Skeet	72 OR	1 Q	93	1st place, gold medalist(s)
Maura Genovesi	10 m air pistol	378	28	Did not advance	
Maura Genovesi	25 m pistol	286	32	Did not advance	
Valentina Turisini	10 m air rifle	393	28	Did not advance	
Valentina Turisini	50 m rifle 3 positions	579	15	Did not advance	
Deborah Gelisio	Trap	66	7	Did not advance	

== Swimming ==
Men

Athlete	Event	Heat		Semifinal		Final	
Athlete	Event	Time	Rank	Time	Rank	Time	Rank
Mattia Aversa	200 m backstroke	2:00.25	25	Did not advance			
Niccolò Beni	200 m butterfly	1:56.99	20	Did not advance			
Alessio Boggiatto	200 m individual medley	1:58.80	7 Q	1:59.77	12	Did not advance	
Alessio Boggiatto	400 m individual medley	4:10.68	6 Q	—N/a		4:12:16	4
Emiliano Brembilla	200 m freestyle	1:47.04	9 Q	1:47.70	11	Did not advance	
Paolo Bossini	200 m breaststroke	2:08.98	2 Q	2:09.95	7 Q	2:11.48	8
Alessandro Calvi	50 m freestyle	22.50	28	Did not advance			
Federico Colbertaldo	400 m freestyle	3:45.28	11	—N/a		Did not advance	
Federico Colbertaldo	1500 m freestyle	14:51.44	10	—N/a		Did not advance	
Mirco di Tora	100 m backstroke	54.39	4 Q	54.92	15	Did not advance	
Loris Facci	200 m breaststroke	2:09.12	3 Q	2:09.75	6 Q	2:10.57	7
Damiano Lestingi	200 m backstroke	1:58.53	11 Q	1:58.25	11	Did not advance	
Filippo Magnini	100 m freestyle	48.30	10 Q	48.11	9	Did not advance	
Luca Marin	400 m individual medley	4:10.22	3 Q	—N/a		4:12.47	5
Mattia Nalesso	100 m butterfly	DNF		Did not advance			
Samuel Pizzetti	1500 m freestyle	15:07.02	17	—N/a		Did not advance	
Massimiliano Rosolino	200 m freestyle	1:48.76	28	Did not advance			
Massimiliano Rosolino	400 m freestyle	3:45.57	13	—N/a		Did not advance	
Alessandro Terrin	100 m breaststroke	DSQ		Did not advance			
Alessandro Calvi; Christian Galenda; Filippo Magnini; Michele Santucci	4 × 100 m freestyle relay	3:12.65	4 Q	—N/a		3:11.48 NR	4
Marco Belotti; Emiliano Brembilla; Nicola Cassio; Massimiliano Rosolino	4 × 200 m freestyle relay	7:07.84	2 Q	—N/a		7:05.35	4
Mirco di Tora; Filippo Magnini; Mattia Nalesso; Alessandro Terrin	4 × 100 m medley relay	3:34.32	8 Q	—N/a		DSQ	

Women

Athlete	Event	Heat		Semifinal		Final	
Athlete	Event	Time	Rank	Time	Rank	Time	Rank
Romina Armellini	100 m backstroke	1:02.21	26	Did not advance			
Ilaria Bianchi	100 m butterfly	58.12	7 Q	DSQ		Did not advance	
Paola Cavallino	200 m butterfly	2:10.46	20	Did not advance			
Cristina Chiuso	50 m freestyle	25.74	34	Did not advance			
Alessia Filippi	800 m freestyle	8:21.95	4 Q	—N/a		8:20.23	2nd place, silver medalist(s)
Alessia Filippi	400 m individual medley	4:35.11	3 Q	—N/a		4:34.34	5
Roberta Panara	100 m breaststroke	1:08.90	22	Did not advance			
Federica Pellegrini	200 m freestyle	1:55.45 WR	1 Q	1:57.23	3 Q	1:54.82 WR	1st place, gold medalist(s)
Federica Pellegrini	400 m freestyle	4:02.19 OR	1 Q	—N/a		4:04.56	5
Maria Laura Simonetto	100 m freestyle	56.72	42	Did not advance			
Cristina Chiuso; Erika Ferraioli; Federica Pellegrini; Maria Laura Simonetto	4 × 100 m freestyle relay	3:40.42	10	—N/a		Did not advance	
Alice Carpanese; Alessia Filippi; Federica Pellegrini; Renata Spagnolo; Flavia Zoccari*	4 × 200 m freestyle relay	7:53.38 NR	3 Q	—N/a		7:49.76	4
Romina Armellini; Ilaria Bianchi; Roberta Panara; Federica Pellegrini	4 × 100 m medley relay	4:04.93	10	—N/a		Did not advance	

== Synchronized swimming ==
Athlete	Event	Technical routine		Free routine (preliminary)			Free routine (final)		
Athlete	Event	Points	Rank	Points	Total (technical + free)	Rank	Points	Total (technical + free)	Rank
Beatrice Adelizzi; Giulia Lapi	Duet	46.834	7	47.000	93.834	7 Q	46.917	93.751	7

== Table tennis ==
Athlete	Event	Preliminary round	Round 1	Round 2	Round 3	Round 4	Quarterfinals	Semifinals	Final / BM	
Athlete	Event	Opposition Result	Opposition Result	Opposition Result	Opposition Result	Opposition Result	Opposition Result	Opposition Result	Opposition Result	Rank
Mihai Bobocica	Men's singles	Norouzi (IRI); W 4–2	Kuzmin (RUS); W 4–1	Tokič (SLO); L 3–4	Did not advance					
Nikoleta Stefanova	Women's singles	Bye	Fadeeva (RUS); W 4–0	Boroš (CRO); L 1–4	Did not advance					
Tan Wenling	Women's singles	Bye	Sorochinskaya (UKR); W 4–2	Li Qb (AUT); L 2-4	Did not advance					

== Taekwondo ==
Athlete	Event	Round of 16	Quarterfinals	Semifinals	Repechage	Bronze Medal	Final	
Athlete	Event	Opposition Result	Opposition Result	Opposition Result	Opposition Result	Opposition Result	Opposition Result	Rank
Mauro Sarmiento	Men's −80 kg	Konan (CIV); W 4–1	S López (USA); W 1–0	Cook (GBR); W 6–5	Bye		Saei (IRI); L 2–4	2nd place, silver medalist(s)
Leonardo Basile	Men's +80 kg	Matos (CUB); L 1–3	Did not advance					
Veronica Calabrese	Women's −57 kg	Patiño (COL); W 2–0	Diedhiou (SEN); W 3–0	Lim S-J (KOR); L 1–5	Bye	D López (USA); L 2–3	Did not advance	5

== Tennis ==
Men

Athlete	Event	Round of 64	Round of 32	Round of 16	Quarterfinals	Semifinals	Final / BM	
Athlete	Event	Opposition Score	Opposition Score	Opposition Score	Opposition Score	Opposition Score	Opposition Score	Rank
Simone Bolelli	Singles	Hănescu (ROU); L 5–7, 6–3, 4–6	Did not advance					
Andreas Seppi	Singles	Robredo (ESP); W 6–4, 4–6, 8–6	Berdych (CZE); L 3–6, 6–7^{(4–7)}	Did not advance				
Potito Starace	Singles	Nadal (ESP); L 2–6, 6–3, 2–6	Did not advance					
Simone Bolelli; Andreas Seppi	Doubles	—N/a	Federer / Wawrinka (SUI); L 5–7, 1–6	Did not advance				

Women

Athlete	Event	Round of 64	Round of 32	Round of 16	Quarterfinals	Semifinals	Final / BM	
Athlete	Event	Opposition Score	Opposition Score	Opposition Score	Opposition Score	Opposition Score	Opposition Score	Rank
Sara Errani	Singles	Stosur (AUS); L 3–6, 2–6	Did not advance					
Flavia Pennetta	Singles	Kanepi (EST); L 2–6, 6–7^{(6–8)}	Did not advance					
Mara Santangelo	Singles	Safina (RUS); L 3–6, 6–7^{(1–7)}	Did not advance					
Francesca Schiavone	Singles	Amanmuradova (UZB); W 6–4, 6–2	Radwańska (POL); W 6–3, 7–6^{(8–6)}	Zvonareva (RUS); L 6–7^{(4–7)}, 4-6	Did not advance			
Flavia Pennetta; Francesca Schiavone	Doubles	—N/a	Dellacqua / Molik (AUS); W 6–4, 6–4	Chuang C-j / Chan Y-j (TPE); W 7–6^{(7–1)}, 1–6, 8–6	A Bondarenko / K Bondarenko (UKR); L 1–6, 6–3, 7–5	Did not advance		
Mara Santangelo; Roberta Vinci	Doubles	—N/a	Kuznetsova / Safina (RUS); L 1–6, 6–3, 5–7	Did not advance				

== Triathlon ==
Athlete	Event	Swim (1.5 km)	Trans 1	Bike (40 km)	Trans 2	Run (10 km)	Total Time	Rank
Emilio D'Aquino	Men's	18:22	0:28	58:56	0:29	35:43	1:53:58.22	40
Daniel Fontana	Men's	18:22	0:28	58:55	0:28	34:26	1:52:39.21	33
Charlotte Bonin	Women's	20:07	0:29	1:06:58	0:38	41:30	2:09:42.09	44
Daniela Chmet	Women's	20:00	0:31	Lapped				

== Volleyball ==
=== Beach ===
Athlete	Event	Preliminary round	Standing	Round of 16	Quarterfinals	Semifinals	Final / BM	
Athlete	Event	Opposition Score	Standing	Opposition Score	Opposition Score	Opposition Score	Opposition Score	Rank
Eugenio Amore; Riccardo Lione	Men's	Pool D Araújo – Luiz (BRA); L 0 – 2 (18–21, 18–21); Doppler – Gartmayer (AUT); L 0 – 2 (19–21, 22–24); Barsouk – Kolodinsky (RUS); L 0 – 2 (17–21, 13–21)	4	Did not advance				

=== Indoor ===
Italy entered both a men's team and a women's team in the indoor tournaments. The men's team won all their group matches but one, thereby advancing to the medal round. There, they won the quarterfinal, but lost both the semifinal and the match for bronze, finishing in 4th place for the tournament. The women's team also won all group matches but one, also advancing to the medal round. They lost the quarterfinal however, finishing in a tie for 5th place in the tournament.

==== Men's tournament ====
Roster

The following is the Italian roster in the men's volleyball tournament of the 2008 Summer Olympics.

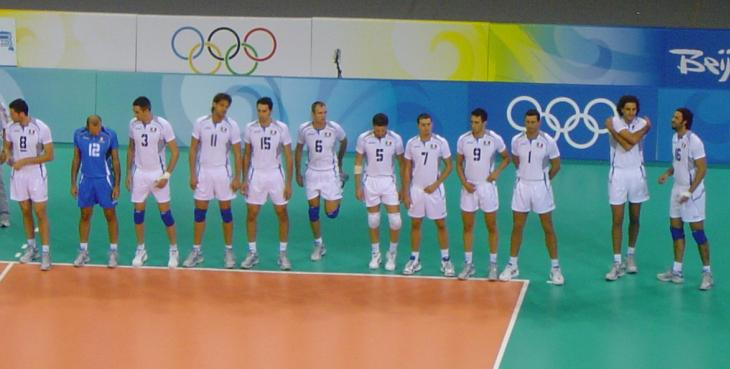
Italy's team just before the group stage match against the United States. From left: Cisolla, Corsano, Gavotto, Zlatanov, Birarelli, Meoni, Vermiglio, Paparoni, Martino, Mastrangelo, Fei, Bovolenta.

Head Coach: Andrea Anastasi

No.	Name	Date of birth	Height	Weight	Spike	Block	2008 club
1	Luigi Mastrangelo	17 August 1975	2.02 m (6 ft 8 in)	90 kg (200 lb)	368 cm (145 in)	336 cm (132 in)	(Italy) M. Roma Volley
3	Mauro Gavotto	16 April 1979	2.01 m (6 ft 7 in)	88 kg (194 lb)	350 cm (140 in)	330 cm (130 in)	(Italy) Acqua Paradiso Gabeca
5	Valerio Vermiglio	1 March 1976	1.90 m (6 ft 3 in)	83 kg (183 lb)	342 cm (135 in)	320 cm (130 in)	(Italy) Lube Banca Marche
6	Marco Meoni	25 May 1973	1.97 m (6 ft 6 in)	86 kg (190 lb)	338 cm (133 in)	313 cm (123 in)	(Italy) Copra Nordmeccanica
7	Alessandro Paparoni	17 August 1981	1.91 m (6 ft 3 in)	75 kg (165 lb)	340 cm (130 in)	314 cm (124 in)	(Italy) Lube Banca Marche
8	Alberto Cisolla (c)	10 October 1977	1.97 m (6 ft 6 in)	86 kg (190 lb)	367 cm (144 in)	345 cm (136 in)	(Italy) Sisley Treviso
9	Matteo Martino	28 January 1987	1.97 m (6 ft 6 in)	84 kg (185 lb)	340 cm (130 in)	322 cm (127 in)	(Italy) Sparkling Milano
11	Hristo Zlatanov	21 April 1976	2.04 m (6 ft 8 in)	103 kg (227 lb)	355 cm (140 in)	315 cm (124 in)	(Italy) Copra Nordmeccanica
12	Mirko Corsano (L)	28 October 1973	1.90 m (6 ft 3 in)	87 kg (192 lb)	342 cm (135 in)	303 cm (119 in)	(Italy) Lube Banca Marche
14	Alessandro Fei	29 November 1978	2.04 m (6 ft 8 in)	90 kg (200 lb)	358 cm (141 in)	336 cm (132 in)	(Italy) Sisley Treviso
15	Emanuele Birarelli	8 February 1981	2.00 m (6 ft 7 in)	95 kg (209 lb)	332 cm (131 in)	316 cm (124 in)	(Italy) Itas Diatec
16	Vigor Bovolenta	30 May 1974	2.02 m (6 ft 8 in)	95 kg (209 lb)	362 cm (143 in)	327 cm (129 in)	(Italy) Copra Nordmeccanica

Group play – Pool A

Pos	Team	Pld	W	L	Pts	SPW	SPL	SPR	SW	SL	SR	Qualification
1	United States	5	5	0	10	460	371	1.240	15	4	3.750	Quarterfinals
2	Italy	5	4	1	9	439	401	1.095	13	6	2.167	Quarterfinals
3	Bulgaria	5	3	2	8	446	440	1.014	10	9	1.111	Quarterfinals
4	China	5	2	3	7	445	492	0.904	9	13	0.692	Quarterfinals
5	Venezuela	5	1	4	6	421	451	0.933	8	12	0.667	
6	Japan	5	0	5	5	392	448	0.875	4	15	0.267	

10 August 2008; 12:10	Italy	3–1	Japan	Beijing Institute of Technology Gymnasium, Beijing; Attendance: 3,000; Referees: Humberto Salas (MEX), Victor Rodriguez (PUR)
10 August 2008; 12:10	(25–19, 25–18, 23–25, 25–17); Results Statistics			Beijing Institute of Technology Gymnasium, Beijing; Attendance: 3,000; Referees: Humberto Salas (MEX), Victor Rodriguez (PUR)

12 August 2008; 12:30	United States	3–1	Italy	Capital Indoor Stadium, Beijing; Attendance: 12,500; Referees: Ibrahim Al-Naama (QAT), Kim Kun-tae (KOR)
12 August 2008; 12:30	(24–26, 25–22, 25–15, 25–21); Results Statistics			Capital Indoor Stadium, Beijing; Attendance: 12,500; Referees: Ibrahim Al-Naama (QAT), Kim Kun-tae (KOR)

14 August 2008; 10:00	Italy	3–0	Venezuela	Beijing Institute of Technology Gymnasium, Beijing; Attendance: 3,300; Referees: Mohammad Shahmiri (IRI), Mitch Davidson (CAN)
14 August 2008; 10:00	(25–21, 25–20, 25–21); Results Statistics			Beijing Institute of Technology Gymnasium, Beijing; Attendance: 3,300; Referees: Mohammad Shahmiri (IRI), Mitch Davidson (CAN)

16 August 2008; 14:50	Italy	3–0	Bulgaria	Capital Indoor Stadium, Beijing; Attendance: 8,000; Referees: Umit Sokullu (TUR), Mohammad Shahmiri (IRI)
16 August 2008; 14:50	(25–20, 25–21, 25–16) result statistics			Capital Indoor Stadium, Beijing; Attendance: 8,000; Referees: Umit Sokullu (TUR), Mohammad Shahmiri (IRI)

18 August 2008; 20:00	China	2–3	Italy	Capital Indoor Stadium, Beijing; Attendance: 12,500; Referees: Mitch Davidson (CAN), Humberto Salas (MEX)
18 August 2008; 20:00	(17–25, 23–25, 25–21, 25–20, 14–16) result statistics			Capital Indoor Stadium, Beijing; Attendance: 12,500; Referees: Mitch Davidson (CAN), Humberto Salas (MEX)

Quarterfinal

20 August 2008; 12:15	Italy	3–2	Poland	Capital Indoor Stadium, Beijing; Attendance: 8,000; Referees: Umit Sokullu (TUR), Patrick Deregnaucourt (FRA)
20 August 2008; 12:15	(25–19, 25–22, 18–25, 26–28, 17–15) result statistics			Capital Indoor Stadium, Beijing; Attendance: 8,000; Referees: Umit Sokullu (TUR), Patrick Deregnaucourt (FRA)

Semifinal

22 August 2008; 20:00	Italy	1–3	Brazil	Capital Indoor Stadium, Beijing; Attendance: 12,500; Referees: Kun-Tae Kim (KOR), Humberto Salas (MEX)
22 August 2008; 20:00	(25–19, 18–25, 21–25, 22–25) result statistics			Capital Indoor Stadium, Beijing; Attendance: 12,500; Referees: Kun-Tae Kim (KOR), Humberto Salas (MEX)

Bronze medal game

24 August 2008; 10:00	(bronze) Russia	3–0	Italy	Capital Indoor Stadium, Beijing; Attendance: 11,500; Referees: Frank Leuthauser (GER), Dejan Jovanovic (SRB)
24 August 2008; 10:00	(25–22, 25–19, 25–23) result statistics			Capital Indoor Stadium, Beijing; Attendance: 11,500; Referees: Frank Leuthauser (GER), Dejan Jovanovic (SRB)

==== Women's tournament ====
Roster

The following is the Italian roster in the women's volleyball tournament of the 2008 Summer Olympics.

Head Coach: Massimo Barbolini

№	Name	Date of birth	Height	Weight	Spike	Block	2008 club
1	Paola Croce	6 March 1978	1.67 m (5 ft 6 in)	52 kg (115 lb)	290 cm (110 in)	265 cm (104 in)	(Italy) Volley Bergamo
3	Nadia Centoni	19 June 1981	1.84 m (6 ft 0 in)	63 kg (139 lb)	307 cm (121 in)	291 cm (115 in)	(France) RC Cannes
5	Martina Guiggi	1 May 1984	1.87 m (6 ft 2 in)	69 kg (152 lb)	315 cm (124 in)	290 cm (110 in)	(Italy) Scavolini Pesaro
6	Jenny Barazza	24 July 1981	1.88 m (6 ft 2 in)	77 kg (170 lb)	300 cm (120 in)	285 cm (112 in)	(Italy) Volley Bergamo
7	Manuela Secolo	22 February 1977	1.80 m (5 ft 11 in)	70 kg (150 lb)	302 cm (119 in)	279 cm (110 in)	(Italy) Famila Chieri
8	Paola Cardullo (L)	18 March 1982	1.62 m (5 ft 4 in)	56 kg (123 lb)	275 cm (108 in)	268 cm (106 in)	(Italy) Asystel Novara
9	Serena Ortolani	7 January 1987	1.86 m (6 ft 1 in)	63 kg (139 lb)	308 cm (121 in)	288 cm (113 in)	(Italy) Yamamay Busto Arsizio
11	Francesca Piccinini	10 January 1979	1.84 m (6 ft 0 in)	75 kg (165 lb)	304 cm (120 in)	279 cm (110 in)	(Italy) Volley Bergamo
12	Francesca Ferretti	15 February 1984	1.80 m (5 ft 11 in)	70 kg (150 lb)	296 cm (117 in)	280 cm (110 in)	(Italy) Scavolini Pesaro
14	Eleonora Lo Bianco (c)	22 December 1979	1.71 m (5 ft 7 in)	70 kg (150 lb)	287 cm (113 in)	273 cm (107 in)	(Italy) Volley Bergamo
15	Taismary Agüero	5 March 1977	1.78 m (5 ft 10 in)	69 kg (152 lb)	322 cm (127 in)	300 cm (120 in)	(Turkey) Türk Telekom Ankara
16	Simona Gioli	17 September 1977	1.84 m (6 ft 0 in)	72 kg (159 lb)	307 cm (121 in)	283 cm (111 in)	(Italy) Despar Sirio Perugia

Group play – Pool A

Pos	Team	Pld	W	L	Pts	SPW	SPL	SPR	SW	SL	SR	Qualification
1	Brazil	5	5	0	10	377	226	1.668	15	0	MAX	Quarterfinals
2	Italy	5	4	1	9	372	315	1.181	12	4	3.000	Quarterfinals
3	Russia	5	3	2	8	353	312	1.131	10	6	1.667	Quarterfinals
4	Serbia	5	2	3	7	343	349	0.983	6	10	0.600	Quarterfinals
5	Kazakhstan	5	1	4	6	323	404	0.800	4	13	0.308	
6	Algeria	5	0	5	5	230	392	0.587	1	15	0.067	

9 August 2008; 10:00	Italy	3–1	Russia	Beijing Institute of Technology Gymnasium; Attendance: 3,100; Referees: Frank Leuthauser (Germany), Karin Zahorcova (Czech Republic)
9 August 2008; 10:00	(25–20, 17–25, 25–16, 25–23) result statistics			Beijing Institute of Technology Gymnasium; Attendance: 3,100; Referees: Frank Leuthauser (Germany), Karin Zahorcova (Czech Republic)

11 August 2008; 12:00	Kazakhstan	0–3	Italy	Beijing Institute of Technology Gymnasium; Attendance: 3,100; Referees: Patricia Salvatore (United States), Humberto Salas (Mexico)
11 August 2008; 12:00	(19–25, 15–25, 21–25) result statistics			Beijing Institute of Technology Gymnasium; Attendance: 3,100; Referees: Patricia Salvatore (United States), Humberto Salas (Mexico)

13 August 2008; 10:00	Italy	3–0	Algeria	Beijing Institute of Technology Gymnasium; Attendance: 3,400; Referees: Karin Zahorcova (Czech Republic), Janpen Jirakakul (Thailand)
13 August 2008; 10:00	(25–7, 25–20, 25–12) result statistics			Beijing Institute of Technology Gymnasium; Attendance: 3,400; Referees: Karin Zahorcova (Czech Republic), Janpen Jirakakul (Thailand)

15 August 2008; 14:30	Serbia	0–3	Italy	Capital Indoor Stadium; Attendance: 11,000; Referees: Frans Loderus (Netherlands), Frank Leuthauser (Germany)
15 August 2008; 14:30	(23–25, 20–25, 19–25) result statistics			Capital Indoor Stadium; Attendance: 11,000; Referees: Frans Loderus (Netherlands), Frank Leuthauser (Germany)

17 August 2008; 15:15	Italy	0–3	Brazil	Capital Indoor Stadium; Attendance: 10,500; Referees: Humberto Salas (Mexico), Mitch Davidson (Canada)
17 August 2008; 15:15	(16–25, 22–25, 17–25) result statistics			Capital Indoor Stadium; Attendance: 10,500; Referees: Humberto Salas (Mexico), Mitch Davidson (Canada)

Quarterfinal

19 August 2008; 22:00	United States	3–2	Italy	Capital Indoor Stadium; Attendance: 10,000; Referees: Francisco de Souza (Brazil), Osamu Sakaide (Japan)
19 August 2008; 22:00	(20–25, 25–21, 19–25, 25–18, 15–6) result statistics			Capital Indoor Stadium; Attendance: 10,000; Referees: Francisco de Souza (Brazil), Osamu Sakaide (Japan)

== Water polo ==
Italy participated in both the men's and the women's tournaments. The men's team finished in 9th place, while the women's team finished in 6th place.

=== Men's tournament ===
Roster

The following is the Italian roster in the men's water polo tournament of the 2008 Summer Olympics.

№	Name	Pos.	Height	Weight	Date of birth	Club
1	Stefano Tempesti	GK	2.05 m (6 ft 9 in)	97 kg (214 lb)	9 June 1979	(Italy) Pro Recco
2	Luigi Di Costanzo	D	1.85 m (6 ft 1 in)	82 kg (181 lb)	5 February 1982	(Italy) Posillipo Naples
3	Leonardo Binchi	CB	2.00 m (6 ft 7 in)	100 kg (220 lb)	27 August 1975	(Italy) Brescia
4	Fabrizio Buonocore	CB	1.86 m (6 ft 1 in)	85 kg (187 lb)	28 April 1977	(Italy) Posillipo Naples
5	Valentino Gallo	D	1.93 m (6 ft 4 in)	90 kg (200 lb)	17 July 1985	(Italy) Posillipo Naples
6	Maurizio Felugo	D	1.89 m (6 ft 2 in)	82 kg (181 lb)	4 March 1981	(Italy) Pro Recco
7	Andrea Mangiante	CB	1.91 m (6 ft 3 in)	92 kg (203 lb)	1 July 1976	(Italy) Pro Recco
8	Alberto Angelini	D	1.76 m (5 ft 9 in)	85 kg (187 lb)	28 September 1974	(Italy) Pro Recco
9	Fabio Bencivenga	CF	2.01 m (6 ft 7 in)	97 kg (214 lb)	20 January 1976	(Italy) Posillipo Naples
10	Alessandro Calcaterra	CF	1.87 m (6 ft 2 in)	102 kg (225 lb)	26 May 1975	(Italy) Pro Recco
11	Leonardo Sottani	D	1.92 m (6 ft 4 in)	86 kg (190 lb)	1 November 1973	(Italy) Cremona
12	Federico Mistrangelo	D	1.81 m (5 ft 11 in)	80 kg (180 lb)	11 May 1981	(Italy) Savona
13	Fabio Violetti	GK	1.91 m (6 ft 3 in)	85 kg (187 lb)	1 February 1974	(Italy) Posillipo Naples

Head coach: Paolo Malara

Group play

Team	Pld	W	D	L	GF	GA	GD	Pts	Qualification
United States	5	4	0	1	37	31	+6	8	Qualified for the semifinals
Croatia	5	4	0	1	56	31	+25	8	Qualified for the quarterfinals
Serbia	5	3	0	2	50	38	+12	6	Qualified for the quarterfinals
Germany	5	2	0	3	33	44	−11	4	Will play for places 7–10
Italy	5	2	0	3	57	50	+7	4	Will play for places 7–12
China	5	0	0	5	25	64	−39	0	Will play for places 7–12

All times are China Standard Time (UTC+8).

10 August 2008; 15:20	Report	Croatia	11–7	Italy	Ying Tung Natatorium, Beijing; Referees: Simion (ROU), Antsiferov (RUS)
10 August 2008; 15:20	Report	Score by quarters: 3–3, 2–0, 4–1, 2–3			Ying Tung Natatorium, Beijing; Referees: Simion (ROU), Antsiferov (RUS)
10 August 2008; 15:20	Report	Bošković 3, Bušlje 2, Marković 2	Goals	Felugo 3, Calcaterra 2	Ying Tung Natatorium, Beijing; Referees: Simion (ROU), Antsiferov (RUS)

12 August 2008; 12:10	Report	Italy	11–12	United States	Ying Tung Natatorium, Beijing; Referees: Brguljan (MNE), Patelli (BRA)
12 August 2008; 12:10	Report	Score by quarters: 1–2, 2–3, 4–3, 4–4			Ying Tung Natatorium, Beijing; Referees: Brguljan (MNE), Patelli (BRA)
12 August 2008; 12:10	Report	Gallo 3, Felugo 3, Calcaterra 2, Sottani 2	Goals	Powers 3, Azevedo 2	Ying Tung Natatorium, Beijing; Referees: Brguljan (MNE), Patelli (BRA)

14 August 2008; 16:40	Report	China	7–19	Italy	Ying Tung Natatorium, Beijing; Referees: Kiszelly (HUN), Koryzna (POL)
14 August 2008; 16:40	Report	Score by quarters: 2–5, 2–5, 1–4, 2–5			Ying Tung Natatorium, Beijing; Referees: Kiszelly (HUN), Koryzna (POL)
14 August 2008; 16:40	Report	Xie 3, Han 2	Goals	Calcaterra 4, Gallo 3, Angelini 3, Di Costanzo 2, Felugo 2, Mistrangelo 2	Ying Tung Natatorium, Beijing; Referees: Kiszelly (HUN), Koryzna (POL)

16 August 2008; 9:30	Report	Germany	8–7	Italy	Ying Tung Natatorium, Beijing; Referees: Brguljan (MNE), Turcotte (CAN)
16 August 2008; 9:30	Report	Score by quarters: 2–1, 3–1, 0–2, 3–3			Ying Tung Natatorium, Beijing; Referees: Brguljan (MNE), Turcotte (CAN)
16 August 2008; 9:30	Report	Schertwitis 2	Goals	Calcaterra 3	Ying Tung Natatorium, Beijing; Referees: Brguljan (MNE), Turcotte (CAN)

18 August 2008; 9:30	Report	Serbia	12–13	Italy	Ying Tung Natatorium, Beijing; Referees: Klopper (NED), Antsiferov (RUS)
18 August 2008; 9:30	Report	Score by quarters: 3–3, 2–3, 3–5, 4–2			Ying Tung Natatorium, Beijing; Referees: Klopper (NED), Antsiferov (RUS)
18 August 2008; 9:30	Report	Šapić 3, Prlainović 2, Filipović 2, Vujasinović 2	Goals	Calcaterra 3, Felugo 2, Bencivenga 2, Sottani 2	Ying Tung Natatorium, Beijing; Referees: Klopper (NED), Antsiferov (RUS)

Classification quarterfinal

20 August 2008; 09:30	Report	Canada	11–13	Italy	Ying Tung Natatorium, Beijing; Referees: Rak (CRO), Ni (CHN)
20 August 2008; 09:30	Report	Score by quarters: 1–4, 3–2, 3–3, 4–4			Ying Tung Natatorium, Beijing; Referees: Rak (CRO), Ni (CHN)
20 August 2008; 09:30	Report	Graham 4, Miller 2	Goals	Sottani 3, Gallo 2, Felugo 2, Calcaterra 2	Ying Tung Natatorium, Beijing; Referees: Rak (CRO), Ni (CHN)

Classification semifinal

22 August 2008; 10:50	Report	Australia	17–16 (OT)	Italy	Ying Tung Natatorium, Beijing; Referees: Moliner Molins (ESP), Chaney (USA)
22 August 2008; 10:50	Report	Score by quarters: 4–2, 1–5, 4–0, 1–3 OT: 0–1, 3–2, 4–3 (PS)			Ying Tung Natatorium, Beijing; Referees: Moliner Molins (ESP), Chaney (USA)
22 August 2008; 10:50	Report	McGregor 3, Franklin 2, Figlioli 2, Maitland 2, Martin 2, Whalan 2	Goals	Calcaterra 6, Gallo 2, Felugo 2, Angelini 2, Sottani 2	Ying Tung Natatorium, Beijing; Referees: Moliner Molins (ESP), Chaney (USA)

Classification 9th–10th

24 August 2008; 09:30	Report	Italy	10–8	Germany	Ying Tung Natatorium, Beijing; Referees: Rak (CRO), Hart (AUS)
24 August 2008; 09:30	Report	Score by quarters: 4–3, 1–1, 1–1, 4–3			Ying Tung Natatorium, Beijing; Referees: Rak (CRO), Hart (AUS)
24 August 2008; 09:30	Report	Calcaterra 5, Gallo 2, Angelini 2	Goals	Savic 2, Schertwitis 2, Schlotterbeck 2	Ying Tung Natatorium, Beijing; Referees: Rak (CRO), Hart (AUS)

=== Women's tournament ===
Roster

The following is the Italian roster in the women's water polo tournament of the 2008 Summer Olympics.

№	Name	Pos.	Height	Weight	Date of birth	Club
1	Elena Gigli	GK	1.92 m (6 ft 4 in)	82 kg (181 lb)	9 July 1985	(Italy) Giotti Fiorentina
2	Martina Miceli	D	1.68 m (5 ft 6 in)	62 kg (137 lb)	22 October 1973	(Italy) Geymonat Orizzonte
3	Elisa Casanova	CF	1.86 m (6 ft 1 in)	100 kg (220 lb)	26 November 1973	(Italy) Giotti Fiorentina
4	Silvia Bosurgi	D	1.64 m (5 ft 5 in)	59 kg (130 lb)	17 April 1979	(Italy) Geymonat Orizzonte
5	Erzsebet Valkai	CF	1.76 m (5 ft 9 in)	74 kg (163 lb)	6 March 1979	(Italy) Ecofim Roma
6	Manuela Zanchi	D	1.83 m (6 ft 0 in)	65 kg (143 lb)	17 October 1977	(Italy) Geymonat Orizzonte
7	Tania di Mario	D	1.68 m (5 ft 6 in)	53 kg (117 lb)	5 April 1979	(Italy) Geymonat Orizzonte
8	Cinzia Ragusa	CB	1.79 m (5 ft 10 in)	70 kg (150 lb)	24 May 1977	(Italy) Geymonat Orizzonte
9	Francesca Pavan	D	1.73 m (5 ft 8 in)	65 kg (143 lb)	24 April 1979	(Italy) Plebiscito Padova
10	Federica Rocco	CB	1.73 m (5 ft 8 in)	70 kg (150 lb)	25 November 1984	(Italy) Plebiscito Padova
11	Maddalena Musumeci	CB	1.70 m (5 ft 7 in)	65 kg (143 lb)	26 March 1976	(Italy) Geymonat Orizzonte
12	Teresa Frassinetti	CF	1.74 m (5 ft 9 in)	70 kg (150 lb)	24 December 1985	(Italy) Giotti Fiorentina
13	Chiara Brancati	GK	1.78 m (5 ft 10 in)	65 kg (143 lb)	20 July 1981	(Italy) Geymonat Orizzonte

Head coach: Mauro Maugeri

Group play

Team	Pld	W	D	L	GF	GA	GD	Pts	Qualification
United States	3	2	1	0	33	27	+6	5	Qualified for semifinals
Italy	3	2	1	0	28	26	+2	5	Qualified for quarterfinals
China	3	1	0	2	33	33	0	2	Qualified for quarterfinals
Russia	3	0	0	3	26	34	−8	0	Will play for places 7th–8th

All times are China Standard Time (UTC+8).

11 August 2008; 14:20	Report	Russia	8–9	Italy	Ying Tung Natatorium, Beijing; Referees: Gaetan Turcotte (CAN), Nikolaos Argyros (GRE)
11 August 2008; 14:20	Report	Score by quarters: 3–3, 2–1, 2–3, 1–2			Ying Tung Natatorium, Beijing; Referees: Gaetan Turcotte (CAN), Nikolaos Argyros (GRE)
11 August 2008; 14:20	Report	Smurova 2	Goals	Miceli 2, di Mario 2	Ying Tung Natatorium, Beijing; Referees: Gaetan Turcotte (CAN), Nikolaos Argyros (GRE)

13 August 2008; 15:40	Report	United States	9–9	Italy	Ying Tung Natatorium, Beijing; Referees: Alan Balfanbayev (KAZ), Gabor Kiszelly (HUN)
13 August 2008; 15:40	Report	Score by quarters: 0–2, 4–2, 2–2, 3–3			Ying Tung Natatorium, Beijing; Referees: Alan Balfanbayev (KAZ), Gabor Kiszelly (HUN)
13 August 2008; 15:40	Report	Hayes 2, Villa 2	Goals	Miceli 2, di Mario 2	Ying Tung Natatorium, Beijing; Referees: Alan Balfanbayev (KAZ), Gabor Kiszelly (HUN)

15 August 2008; 17:00	Report	Italy	10–9	China	Ying Tung Natatorium, Beijing; Referees: Gabor Kiszelly (HUN), Boris Margeta (SLO)
15 August 2008; 17:00	Report	Score by quarters: 2–2, 4–2, 2–4, 2–1			Ying Tung Natatorium, Beijing; Referees: Gabor Kiszelly (HUN), Boris Margeta (SLO)
15 August 2008; 17:00	Report	Casanova 4, di Mario 3	Goals	Sun Ya. 3, Wang Yi 2, Qiao 2	Ying Tung Natatorium, Beijing; Referees: Gabor Kiszelly (HUN), Boris Margeta (SLO)

Quarterfinal

17 August 2008; 15:40	Report	Italy	11–13 (OT, PSO)	Netherlands	Ying Tung Natatorium, Beijing; Referees: Torsten Bock (GER), Nikolaos Argyros (GRE)
17 August 2008; 15:40	Report	Score by quarters: 2–2, 1–3, 3–2, 2–1 OT: 0–0, 0–0 PSO: 3–5			Ying Tung Natatorium, Beijing; Referees: Torsten Bock (GER), Nikolaos Argyros (GRE)
17 August 2008; 15:40	Report	Zanchi 4, Miceli 2, Bosurgi 2	Goals	Cabout 4, de Bruijn 3, Smit 2, van Belkum 2	Ying Tung Natatorium, Beijing; Referees: Torsten Bock (GER), Nikolaos Argyros (GRE)

Classification 5th–6th

19 August 2008; 13:00	Report	China	10–7	Italy	Ying Tung Natatorium, Beijing; Referees: Ahmet Erhan Tulga (TUR), Gaetan Turcotte (CAN)
19 August 2008; 13:00	Report	Score by quarters: 3–1, 2–3, 1–3, 4–0			Ying Tung Natatorium, Beijing; Referees: Ahmet Erhan Tulga (TUR), Gaetan Turcotte (CAN)
19 August 2008; 13:00	Report	Gao 4, Sun H. 2	Goals	di Mario 3, Zanchi 2	Ying Tung Natatorium, Beijing; Referees: Ahmet Erhan Tulga (TUR), Gaetan Turcotte (CAN)

== Weightlifting ==
Athlete	Event	Snatch		Clean & Jerk		Total	Rank
Athlete	Event	Result	Rank	Result	Rank	Total	Rank
Vito Dellino	Men's −56 kg	110	15	137	14	247	14
Giorgio De Luca	Men's −69 kg	131	21	~~160~~	DNF	131	DNF
Moreno Boer	Men's −105 kg	150	17	170	18	330	18
Genny Pagliaro	Women's −48 kg	~~82~~	DNF	—	—	—	DNF

== Wrestling ==
Key:

- VT – Victory by Fall.
- PP – Decision by Points – the loser with technical points.
- PO – Decision by Points – the loser without technical points.

Men's Greco-Roman

Athlete	Event	Qualification	Round of 16	Quarterfinal	Semifinal	Repechage 1	Repechage 2	Final / BM	
Athlete	Event	Opposition Result	Opposition Result	Opposition Result	Opposition Result	Opposition Result	Opposition Result	Opposition Result	Rank
Andrea Minguzzi	−84 kg	Bye	Noumonvi (FRA); W 3–1 ^{PP}	Mishin (RUS); W 3–1 ^{PP}	Abrahamian (SWE); W 3–1 ^{PP}	Bye		Fodor (HUN); W 3–1 ^{PP}	1st place, gold medalist(s)
Daigoro Timoncini	−96 kg	Kato (JPN); W 3–0 ^{PO}	Khushtov (RUS); L 0–3 ^{PO}	Did not advance		Mambetov (KAZ); L 1–3 ^{PP}	Did not advance		11

== See also ==
- Italy at the 2008 Summer Paralympics
