= Shirata =

Shirata (written: 白田) is a Japanese surname. Notable people with the surname include:

- Hisako Shirata (白田 久子, born 1982), Japanese actress and fashion model
- Miyuki Shirata (白田 美由希, born 1984), Japanese sprint canoeist
- Yoshiko Shirata (born 1952), Japanese accounting scholar
