= Canoeing at the 2008 Summer Olympics – Women's K-1 500 metres =

The women's K-1 500 metres competition in canoeing at the 2008 Summer Olympics took place at the Shunyi Olympic Rowing-Canoeing Park in Beijing.

Competition consisted of three rounds: the heats, the semifinals, and the final. Top finishers in each of the three heats advanced directly to the final, while the next six finishers (placed 2 through 7) in each heat moved on to the semifinals. Top three finishers in each of the two semifinals joined the heat winners in the final.

Heats took place on August 19, semifinals on August 21, and the final on August 23.

== Schedule ==
All times are China Standard Time (UTC+8)

Date	Time	Round
Tuesday, August 19, 2008	16:40-17:10	Heats
Thursday, August 21, 2008	16:20-16:40	Semifinals
Saturday, August 23, 2008	16:20-16:35	Final

== Medalists ==
Gold	Silver	Bronze
Inna Osypenko (UKR)	Josefa Idem (ITA)	Katrin Wagner-Augustin (GER)

== Results ==
=== Heats ===
Qualification Rules: Winner->Finals, 2...6->Semifinals, Rest Out

==== Heat 1 ====
Rank	Athletes	Country	Time	Notes
1	Katalin Kovács	Hungary	1:49.424	QF
2	Maria Teresa Portela	Spain	1:51.654	QS
3	Jennifer Hodson	South Africa	1:51.655	QS
4	Shinobu Kitamoto	Japan	1:52.148	QS
5	Chantal Meek	Australia	1:53.374	QS
6	Małgorzata Chojnacka	Poland	1:53.635	QS
7	Karen Furneaux	Canada	1:54.065	QS
8	Estefania Fontanini	Argentina	2:00.291	
9	Khathia Bâ	Senegal	2:17.740	

==== Heat 2 ====
Rank	Athletes	Country	Time	Notes
1	Josefa Idem	Italy	1:48.864	QF
2	Zhong Hongyan	China	1:49.440	QS
3	Lucy Wainwright	Great Britain	1:50.103	QS
4	Carrie Johnson	United States	1:50.221	QS
5	Henriette Engel Hansen	Denmark	1:52.773	QS
6	Teresa Portela	Portugal	1:53.761	QS
7	Anne Rikala	Finland	1:54.294	QS
8	Tatsiana Fedarovich	Belarus	1:57.881	

==== Heat 3 ====
Rank	Athletes	Country	Time	Notes
1	Katrin Wagner-Augustin	Germany	1:48.875	QF
2	Inna Osypenko	Ukraine	1:49.776	QS
3	Špela Ponomarenko	Slovenia	1:49.973	QS
4	Sofia Paldanius	Sweden	1:51.110	QS
5	Yuliana Salkhova	Russia	1:51.628	QS
6	Erin Taylor	New Zealand	1:52.517	QS
7	Zulmarys Sánchez	Venezuela	1:57.728	QS
8	Lee Sun-Ja	South Korea	1:58.140	

=== Semifinals ===
Qualification Rules: 1..3->Final, Rest Out

==== Semifinal 1 ====
Rank	Athletes	Country	Time	Notes
1	Inna Osypenko	Ukraine	1:51.558	QF
2	Lucy Wainwright	Great Britain	1:52.580	QF
3	Jennifer Hodson	South Africa	1:53.209	QF
4	Carrie Johnson	United States	1:53.721	
5	Sofia Paldanius	Sweden	1:53.797	
6	Teresa Portela	Portugal	1:54.831	
7	Chantal Meek	Australia	1:54.876	
8	Małgorzata Chojnacka	Poland	1:55.619	
9	Zulmarys Sánchez	Venezuela	2:02.764	

==== Semifinal 2 ====
Rank	Athletes	Country	Time	Notes
1	Zhong Hongyan	China	1:53.163	QF
2	Yuliana Salkhova	Russia	1:53.603	QF
3	Špela Ponomarenko	Slovenia	1:53.812	QF
4	Anne Rikala	Finland	1:54.025	
5	Erin Taylor	New Zealand	1:54.300	
6	Maria Teresa Portela	Spain	1:54.981	
7	Karen Furneaux	Canada	1:55.145	
8	Henriette Engel Hansen	Denmark	1:55.960	
9	Shinobu Kitamoto	Japan	2:01.105	

=== Final ===
Rank	Athletes	Country	Time	Notes
Gold medal	Inna Osypenko	Ukraine	1:50.673	
Silver medal	Josefa Idem	Italy	1:50.677	
Bronze medal	Katrin Wagner-Augustin	Germany	1:51.022	
4	Katalin Kovács	Hungary	1:51.139	
5	Zhong Hongyan	China	1:52.220	
6	Špela Ponomarenko	Slovenia	1:52.363	
7	Lucy Wainwright	Great Britain	1:53.102	
8	Jennifer Hodson	South Africa	1:53.353	
9	Yuliana Salkhova	Russia	1:53.973	
