= Alexopoulos =

Alexopoulos (Greek: Αλεξόπουλος) is a Greek patronymic surname meaning "son of Alexios". The female form of the surname is Alexopoulou (Αλεξοπούλου). Notable people with the surname include:

== Alexopoulos ==
- Alexios Alexopoulos (born 1971), Greek sprinter
- Athina-Theodora Alexopoulou (born 1983), Greek sprint canoeist
- Constantine John Alexopoulos (1907–1986), Greek-American mycologist
- Georgios Alexopoulos (born 1977), Greek footballer
- Heléne Alexopoulos, American ballet dancer

== Alexopoulou ==
- Athina-Theodora Alexopoulou (born 1983), Greek sprint canoer
- Christina Alexopoulou (born 1978), Greek politician
- Kleoniki Alexopoulou (born 1984), Greek historian
