= Lucy Wainwright =

Lucy Wainwright may refer to:

- Lucy Hardy-Wainwright (born 1978), British Olympic sprint canoer
- Lucy Wainwright Roche (born 1981), American singer-songwriter; daughter of musicians Loudon Wainwright III and Suzzy Roche
