= Canoeing at the 2008 Summer Olympics – Women's K-4 500 metres =

The women's K-4 500 metres competition in canoeing at the 2008 Summer Olympics took place at the Shunyi Olympic Rowing-Canoeing Park in Beijing between August 18 and 22. The K-4 event is raced in four-person kayaks.

Competition consists of three rounds: the heats, the semifinals, and the final. All boats compete in the heats. The top three finishers in each of the two heats advance directly to the final, while the remaining four finishers from both heats move on to the semifinal. The top three finishers in the semifinal join the heats winners in the final.

Heats took place on August 18, semifinals on August 20, and the final on August 22.

== Schedule ==
All times are China Standard Time (UTC+8)

Date	Time	Round
Monday, August 18, 2008	16:30-16:50	Heats
Wednesday, August 20, 2008	16:10-16:20	Semifinal
Friday, August 22, 2008	16:20-16:35	Final

== Medalists ==
Gold	Silver	Bronze
Germany; Fanny Fischer; Nicole Reinhardt; Katrin Wagner-Augustin; Conny Waßmuth	Hungary; Katalin Kovács; Gabriella Szabó; Danuta Kozák; Natasa Janics	Australia; Lisa Oldenhof; Hannah Davis; Chantal Meek; Lyndsie Fogarty

== Results ==
=== Heats ===
Qualification Rules: 1..3->Final, 4..7->Semifinal + 8th best time, Rest Out

==== Heat 1 ====
Rank	Athletes	Country	Time	Notes
1	Fanny Fischer, Nicole Reinhardt, Katrin Wagner-Augustin, Conny Waßmuth	Germany	1:33.912	QF
2	Xu Yaping, Zhong Hongyan, Yu Lamei, Liang Peixing	China	1:36.971	QF
3	Michele Eray, Carol Joyce, Nicola Mocke, Jennifer Hodson	South Africa	1:37.399	QF
4	Stefania Cicali, Alessandra Galiotto, Fabiana Sgroi, Alice Fagioli	Italy	1:37.436	QS
5	Shinobu Kitamoto, Ayaka Kuno, Mikiko Takeya, Yumiko Suzuki	Japan	1:38.618	QS

==== Heat 2 ====
Rank	Athletes	Country	Time	Notes
1	Katalin Kovács, Gabriella Szabó, Danuta Kozák, Nataša Janić	Hungary	1:34.321	QF
2	Beata Mikołajczyk, Aneta Konieczna, Edyta Dzieniszewska, Dorota Kuczkowska	Poland	1:36.497	QF
3	Lisa Oldenhof, Hannah Davis, Chantal Meek, Lyndsie Fogarty	Australia	1:36.516	QF
4	Beatriz Manchón, Jana Smidakova, Sonia Molanes, Maria Teresa Portela	Spain	1:37.914	QS
5	Émilie Fournel, Karen Furneaux, Geneviève Beauchesne-Sévigny, Kristin Gauthier	Canada	1:39.366	QS

=== Semifinal ===
Qualification Rules: 1..3->Final, Rest Out

Rank	Athletes	Country	Time	Notes
1	Beatriz Manchón, Jana Smidakova, Sonia Molanes, Maria Teresa Portela	Spain	1:37.172	QF
2	Shinobu Kitamoto, Ayaka Kuno, Mikiko Takeya, Yumiko Suzuki	Japan	1:37.449	QF
3	Stefania Cicali, Alessandra Galiotto, Fabiana Sgroi, Alice Fagioli	Italy	1:37.887	QF
4	Émilie Fournel, Karen Furneaux, Geneviève Beauchesne-Sévigny, Kristin Gauthier	Canada	1:38.224	

=== Final ===
Rank	Athletes	Country	Time	Notes
Gold medal	Fanny Fischer, Nicole Reinhardt, Katrin Wagner-Augustin, Conny Waßmuth	Germany	1:32.231	
Silver medal	Katalin Kovács, Gabriella Szabó, Danuta Kozák, Nataša Janić	Hungary	1:32.971	
Bronze medal	Lisa Oldenhof, Hannah Davis, Chantal Meek, Lyndsie Fogarty	Australia	1:34.704	
4	Beata Mikołajczyk, Aneta Konieczna, Edyta Dzieniszewska, Dorota Kuczkowska	Poland	1:34.752	
5	Beatriz Manchón, Jana Smidakova, Sonia Molanes, Maria Teresa Portela	Spain	1:35.366	
6	Shinobu Kitamoto, Ayaka Kuno, Mikiko Takeya, Yumiko Suzuki	Japan	1:36.465	
7	Michele Eray, Carol Joyce, Nicola Mocke, Jennifer Hodson	South Africa	1:36.724	
8	Stefania Cicali, Alessandra Galiotto, Fabiana Sgroi, Alice Fagioli	Italy	1:36.770	
9	Xu Yaping, Zhong Hongyan, Yu Lamei, Liang Peixing	China	1:37.418	

For the fourth straight Summer Olympics, a Fischer won a gold medal in the K-4 500 m only this time it was not Birgit, but her niece Fanny. Wagner-Augustin won her third straight Olympic gold medal in the K-4 500 m event while Kovács of Hungary won her third straight Olympic silver medal in this event.
