= Nicola Mocke =

South African sprint canoer and marathon canoeist

Nicola Mocke (born 14 October 1980 in Fish Hoek) is a South African canoe sprinter and marathon canoeist who competed in the late 2000s. At the 2008 Summer Olympics in Beijing, she finished seventh in the K-4 500 m event.
