= Petra Santy =

Belgian sprint canoer (born 1982)

Petra Santy (born 8 November 1982 in Kortrijk) is a Belgian canoe sprinter who competed in the mid-2000s. At the 2004 Summer Olympics in Athens, she was eliminated in the semifinals of the K-1 500 m event.
