= Guglielmo Guerrini =

Personal information
- Nationality: Italian
- Born: May 24, 1950 (age 74); Bagnacavallo, Italy

Sport
- Country: Italy
- Sport: Canoeing

Guglielmo Guerrini (Bagnacavallo, 24 May 1950) is an Italian sport coach, since 1989 is the trainer of the canoeing champion, Josefa Idem.

== Biography ==
In 1990 he married the German canoeist Josefa Idem, whom he trained since 1989. The couple has two sons, Janek and Jonas.

Under his guidance Idem has won five world championship gold medals and three olympic medals. Guerrini studies and applies innovative methodology, is federal technical consultant for canoeing and, in 2009, was nominated responsible for the preparation in the discipline for the Olympic games 2012 in London. He thus guides Idem to her 8th Olympics.

== See also ==
- Josefa Idem
