= Li Ting (canoeist) =

Chinese canoeist

Personal information
- Native name: 李婷
- Nationality: Chinese
- Born: 31 January 1985 (age 41) Yingkou, Liaoning
- Height: 1.75 m (5 ft 9 in)
- Weight: 69 kg (152 lb)

Sport
- Country: China
- Sport: female sprint canoeist

Li Ting (Chinese: 李婷; born January 31, 1985, in Yingkou, Liaoning) is a Chinese sprint canoer who competed in the mid-2000s. At the 2004 Summer Olympics in Athens, she finished ninth in the K-1 500 m event.
