= Nathalie Marie =

French canoeist

- Born: 21 June 1976 (age 49); Saint-Lô
- Occupation: French sprint canoer

Nathalie Marie (born 21 June 1976 in Saint-Lô) is a French sprint canoer who competed in the mid-2000s. At the 2004 Summer Olympics in Athens, she was eliminated in the semifinals of the K-1 500 m event.
