= Canoeing at the 2004 Summer Olympics – Women's K-1 500 metres =

Kayak competition of the XXVIII Olympic Games

These are the results of the women's K-1 500 metres competition in canoeing at the 2004 Summer Olympics. The K-1 event is raced by single-person canoe sprint kayaks.

== Medalists ==
Gold	Silver	Bronze
Natasa Janics (HUN)	Josefa Idem Guerrini (ITA)	Caroline Brunet (CAN)

== Heats ==
The 23 competitors first raced in three heats. The top finisher in each heat moved directly to the final, and the next 6 finishers in each heat qualified for the two semifinal races. Therefore, only two kayakers were eliminated in the heats. The heats were raced on August 24.

Heat	Place	Athlete	Country	Time	Notes
1	1	Nataša Janić	Hungary	1:49.870	QF
1	2	Katrin Wagner	Germany	1:53.234	QS
1	3	Larissa Peisakhovitch	Israel	1:54.234	QS
1	4	Li Ting	China	1:55.474	QS
1	5	Nathalie Marie	France	1:57.342	QS
1	6	Fernanda Lauro	Argentina	1:59.474	QS
1	7	Doan Thi Cach	Vietnam	2:06.126	QS
1		Natalya Sergeyeva	Kazakhstan	DSQ	
2	1	Caroline Brunet	Canada	1:50.366	QF
2	2	Josefa Idem	Italy	1:50.466	QS
2	3	Petra Santy	Belgium	1:52.834	QS
2	4	Lucy Hardy	Great Britain	1:54.518	QS
2	5	Michaela Strnadova	Czech Republic	1:55.806	QS
2	6	Yulia Borzova	Uzbekistan	1:56.586	QS
2	7	Amanda Rankin	Australia	1:56.678	QS
2	8	Sarce Aronggear	Indonesia	2:03.790	
3	1	Marcela Erbanova	Slovakia	1:53.508	QF
3	2	Aneta Pastuszka	Poland	1:53.840	QS
3	3	Athina-Theodora Alexopoulou	Greece	1:54.828	QS
3	4	Jenni Honkanen	Finland	1:55.244	QS
3	5	Carrie Johnson	United States	1:57.708	QS
3	6	Olga Kostenko	Russia	1:58.520	QS
3	7	Miyuki Shirata	Japan	2:00.860	QS

Sergeyeva was disqualified for not keeping her boat in the automatic starting system, delaying the race start by five minutes. She was also disqualified for starting outside of the automatic starting system.

== Semifinals ==
The top three finishers in each of the two semifinals qualified for the final. Fourth place and higher competitors were eliminated. The semifinals were raced on August 26.

Semifinal 1
1.	Katrin Wagner (GER)	1:52.630	QF
2.	Jenni Honkanen (FIN)	1:53.050	QF
3.	Li Ting (CHN)	1:53.598	QF
4.	Petra Santy (BEL)	1:54.534
5.	Athina-Theodora Alexopoulou (GRE)	1:54.950
6.	Olga Kostenko (RUS)	1:55.766
7.	Michaela Strnadova (CZE)	1:56.154
8.	Amanda Rankin (AUS)	1:56.198
9.	Fernanda Lauro (ARG)	2:00.198
Semifinal 2
1.	Josefa Idem (ITA)	1:50.844	QF
2.	Larissa Peisakhovitch (ISR)	1:55.096	QF
3.	Lucy Hardy (GBR)	1:56.432	QF
4.	Carrie Johnson (USA)	1:56.712
5.	Nathalie Marie (FRA)	1:57.944
6.	Yulia Borzova (UZB)	1:59.560
7.	Miyuki Shirata (JPN)	2:03.076
8.	Doan Thi Cach (VIE)	2:06.692
9.	Aneta Pastuszka (POL)	DSQ

Pastuszka was disqualified for competing in an underweight boat.

== Final ==
The final was raced on August 28.

Gold	Nataša Janić (HUN)	1:47.741
Silver	Josefa Idem (ITA)	1:49.729
Bronze	Caroline Brunet (CAN)	1:50.601
4.	Katrin Wagner (GER)	1:52.557
5.	Marcela Erbanova (SVK)	1:52.685
6.	Larissa Peisakhovitch (ISR)	1:53.089
7.	Lucy Hardy (GBR)	1:53.717
8.	Jenni Honkanen (FIN)	1:53.937
9.	Li Ting (CHN)	1:54.473

Janics, who switched her nationality from Serbia and Montenegro to Hungary three months before the 2004 Games, jumped to an early lead and then held off a late challenge from defending Olympic champion Idem.
