= Amanda Rankin =

Australian sprint canoeist (born 1976)

Medal record

Women's canoe sprint

World Championships
Bronze medal – third place	2003 Gainesville	K-4 1000 m

Amanda Rankin (born 22 October 1976) is an Australian sprint canoeist who has competed since the mid-2000s. She won a bronze medal in the K-4 1000 m event at the 2003 ICF Canoe Sprint World Championships in Gainesville.

Rankin also competed at the 2004, Summer Olympics in Athens, finishing sixth in the K-4 500 m event while being eliminated in the semifinals of the K-1 500 m event.
