= Geneviève Beauchesne-Sévigny =

Canadian canoeist (born 1986)

Personal information
- Born: April 23, 1986 (age 40) Montreal, Quebec, Canada
- Height: 170 cm (5 ft 7 in)
- Weight: 65 kg (143 lb)

Sport
- Country: Canada
- Sport: Canoe sprint

Geneviève Beauchesne-Sevigny (born April 23, 1986, in Montreal, Quebec) is a Canadian sprint canoeist who competed in the late 2000s. At the 2008 Summer Olympics in Beijing, she was eliminated in the semifinals of the K-4 500 m event.

Her brother Gabriel Beauchesne-Sévigny too is a sprint canoeist, who also represented Canada at the 2008 Olympics.
