= Lisa Oldenhof =

Australian canoeist (born 1980)

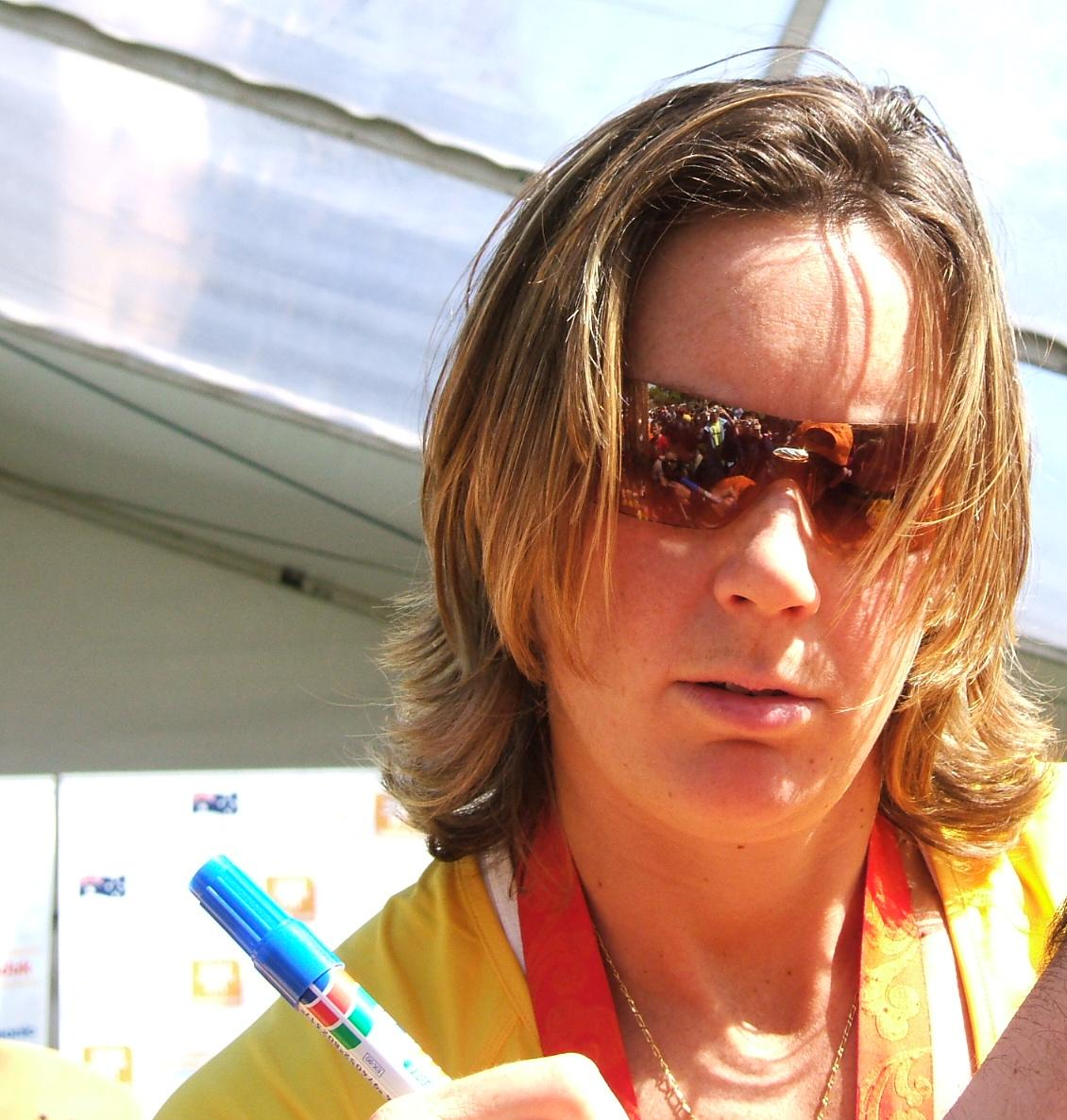

Personal information
- Born: 26 March 1980 (age 46) Perth, Western Australia

Sport
- Sport: canoe sprint
Medal record
Women's canoe sprint
Bronze medal – third place	2008 Beijing	K-4 500 m

Lisa Oldenhof (born 26 March 1980 in Perth, Western Australia) is an Australian sprint canoeist who has competed since the mid-2000s. Competing in two Summer Olympics, she won a bronze medal in the K-4 500 m event at Beijing in 2008.
