= Estefania Fontanini =

Argentine canoeist (born 1988)

Estefanía Fontanini (born February 14, 1988) is an Argentine sprint canoer who competed in the late 2000s. At the 2008 Summer Olympics in Beijing, she was eliminated in the heats of the K-1 500 m event.
