= Erin Taylor =

New Zealand sprint canoeist

Erin Taylor (born 8 June 1987) is a New Zealand sprint canoeist who competed in the late 2000s. At the 2008 Summer Olympics in Beijing, she was eliminated in the semifinals of the K-1 500 m event. She was born in Auckland.
