= Hannah Davis (canoeist) =

Australian sprint canoeist (born 1985)

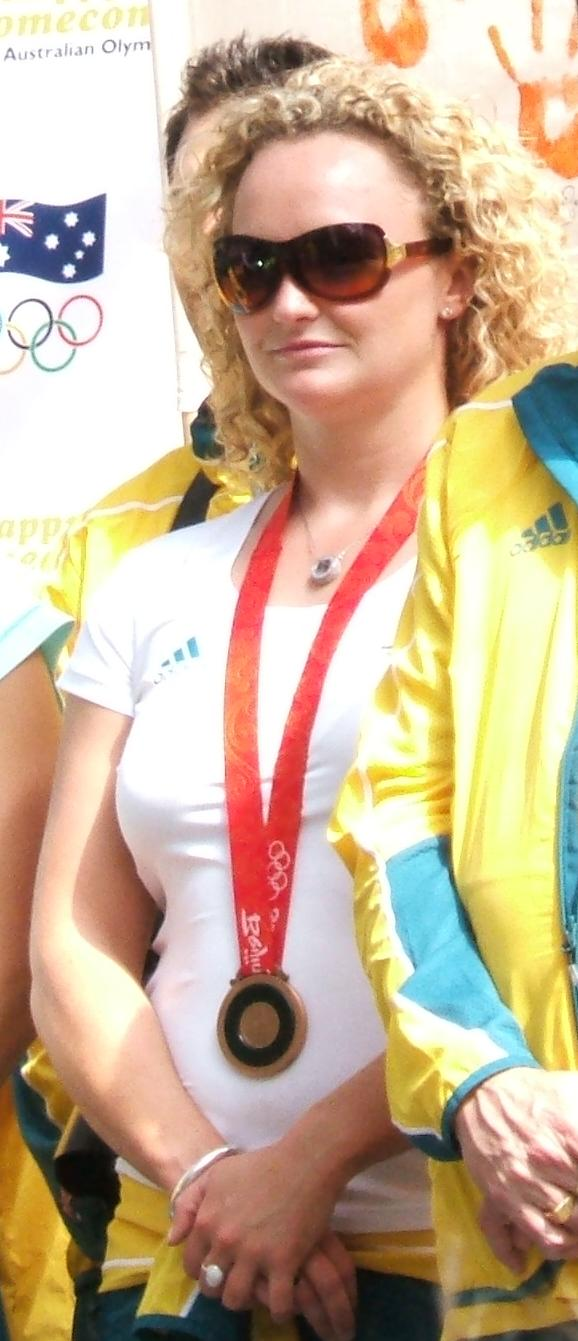
- 2008 Olympic Parade

Personal information
- Nicknames: Han, Shevs, Davo
- Nationality: Australian
- Born: 11 August 1985 (age 41)
- Height: 167 cm (66 in) (2012)
- Weight: 70 kg (154 lb) (2012)

Sport
- Country: Australia
- Sport: Canoeing
- Event: K-4 500 m
- Club: Holdfast Bay Canoe Club
- Coached by: Peter Petho, David Fourier
Medal record
Women's canoe sprint
Bronze medal – third place	2008 Beijing	K-4 500 m
World Championships
Bronze medal – third place	2011 Szeged	K-2 200 m

Hannah Davis (born 11 August 1985) is an Australian sprint canoeist who has competed since the late 2000s. She won a bronze medal at the 2008 Summer Olympics in Beijing in the K-4 500 m event. She also represented Australia at 2012 Summer Olympics in the K-4 500 m event, but did not medal.

== Personal ==
Nicknamed Han, Shevs and Davo, Davis was born 11 August 1985 in Adelaide, South Australia. She attended Mercedes College in South Australia before going to University of Adelaide from 2004 to 2009, where she earned a Bachelor of International Studies. In December 2011, she earned at Masters of Arts in International Relations from the University of Adelaide.

As a child, Davis was a competitive swimmer. This required her to wake up at 5 am every morning to train. Other sports she participated in as a youngster included running and netball. She is also surf lifesaver, competing in the sport when not involved with canoeing. Davis weighs 70 kilograms (150 lb) and is 167 centimetres (66 in) tall.

== Canoeing ==
Davis came into the sport through surf lifesaving. She is a member of the Holdfast Bay Canoe Club. She primarily trains in Adelaide, with a secondary training base in the Gold Coast, Queensland. She has a canoe scholarship with the South Australian Sports Institute and the Australian Institute of Sport.

Davis represented Australia at the 2008 Summer Olympics, where she won a bronze medal in the K-4 500 metres event. Her parents watched her win the bronze medal in China. In the Women's Kayak Doubles, 500 metres event, she finished fifth.

Davis finished third in the K2 200m event and 5th in the K4 500m event at the 2011 World Championships in Szeged, Hungary. She finished 7th in the K4 500m event at the 2011 World Cup 3 in Duisburg, Germany. She finished 5th in the K4 500m event at the 2011 World Cup 2 in Racice, Czech Republic. She finished 1st in the K4 500m event at the 2012 National Championships in Penrith, Australia. She finished 1st in the K4 500m event at the 2012 Oceania Championships in Penrith, Australia.

Davis was selected to represent Australia at 2012 Summer Olympics in the K-4 500 m event. Before the start of the Games, she and her canoe teammates trained in Italy at the AIS European Training Centre located in Varese. Going into the London Games, she was coached by David Foureur who has coached her since 2003 and by Martin Marinov who has coached her since 2007. The Australian K-4 did not qualify for the finals at London 2012.
