= Tatsiana Fedarovich =

Belarusian canoeist

Tatsiana Fedarovich (sometimes listed as Tatyana Fyodorovich, born April 20, 1982) is a Belarusian sprint canoer who competed in the late 2000s. At the 2008 Summer Olympics in Beijing, she was eliminated in the heats of the K-1 500 m event.
