= Liang Peixing =

Chinese canoeist

Personal information
- Native name: 梁培兴
- Nationality: Chinese
- Born: 8 December 1991 (age 34) Chenghai, Shantou, Guangdong

Sport
- Country: China
- Sport: female sprint canoeist

Liang Peixing (born December 8, 1991, in Guangdong) is a Chinese sprint canoer who competed in the late 2000s. She finished ninth in the K-4 500 m event at the 2008 Summer Olympics in Beijing.
