= Carol Joyce =

South African canoeist

Carol Diane Joyce (born 29 December 1981) is a South African Olympic canoe sprinter.

Joyce was born in Port Shepstone, and competed during the late 2000s. At the 2008 Summer Olympics in Beijing, she finished seventh in the K-4 500 m event.
