= Jennifer Hodson =

South African sprint canoer

Jennifer Hodson (born 12 September 1979 in Creighton, KwaZulu–Natal) is a South African canoe sprinter who competed in the late 2000s. At the 2008 Summer Olympics in Beijing, she finished seventh in the K-4 500 m event and eighth in the K-1 500 m event.
