= Đoàn Thị Cách =

Vietnamese canoeist (born 1984)

Đòàn Thị Cách
Personal information
- Native name: Đòàn Thị Cách
- Nationality: Vietnam
- Born: 1 July 1984
- Height: 1.61 m (5 ft 3 in)
- Weight: 54 kg (119 lb)

Sport
- Sport: Canoe sprint
- Event(s): K-1 500 metres, 1000 metres

Achievements and titles
- Olympic finals: 2004 Summer Olympics
Medal record
Women's canoe sprint
Representing Vietnam
Southeast Asian Games
Gold medal – first place	2003 Vietnam	1000 m

Đoàn Thị Cách (born July 1, 1984) is a Nghia Lâm , Nghĩa Hưng , Nam Định Vietnamese sprint canoer who competed in the mid-2000s.

She won the gold medal at the 2003 SEA Games in the 1000 metres event.

At the 2004 Summer Olympics in Athens, she was eliminated in the semifinals of the K-1 500 m event.
