= Lyndsie Fogarty =

Australian sprint canoeist

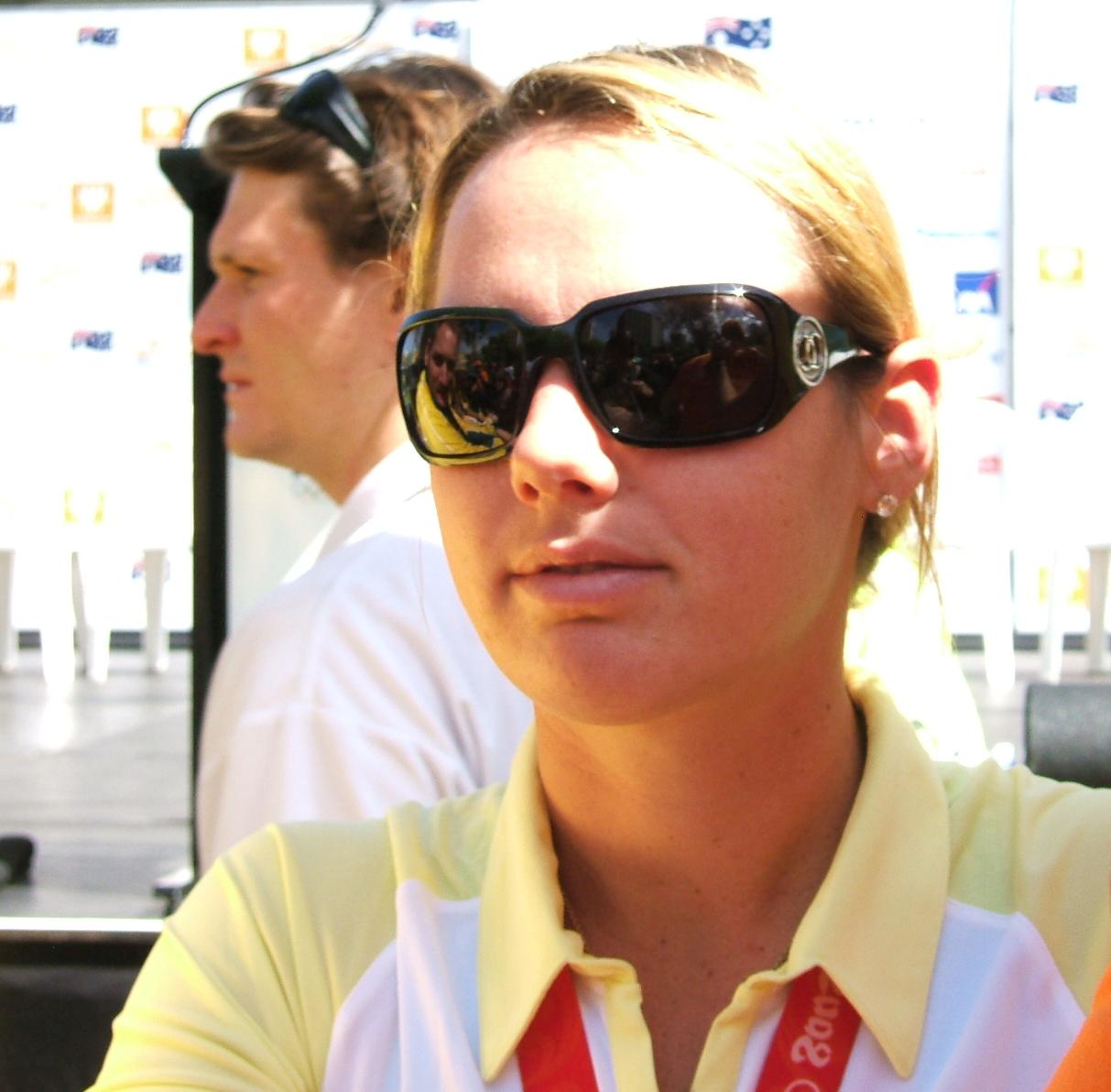

Personal information
- Born: 17 April 1984 (age 42) Brisbane, Queensland

Sport
- Sport: canoe sprint
Medal record
Women's canoe sprint
Bronze medal – third place	2008 Beijing	K-4 500 m

Lyndsie Fogarty (born 17 April 1984 in Brisbane, Queensland) is an Australian sprint canoeist who has competed since the late 2000s. She won a bronze medal at the 2008 Summer Olympics in Beijing in the K-4 500 m event.
