= Mirko Corsano =

Italian volleyball player (born 1973)

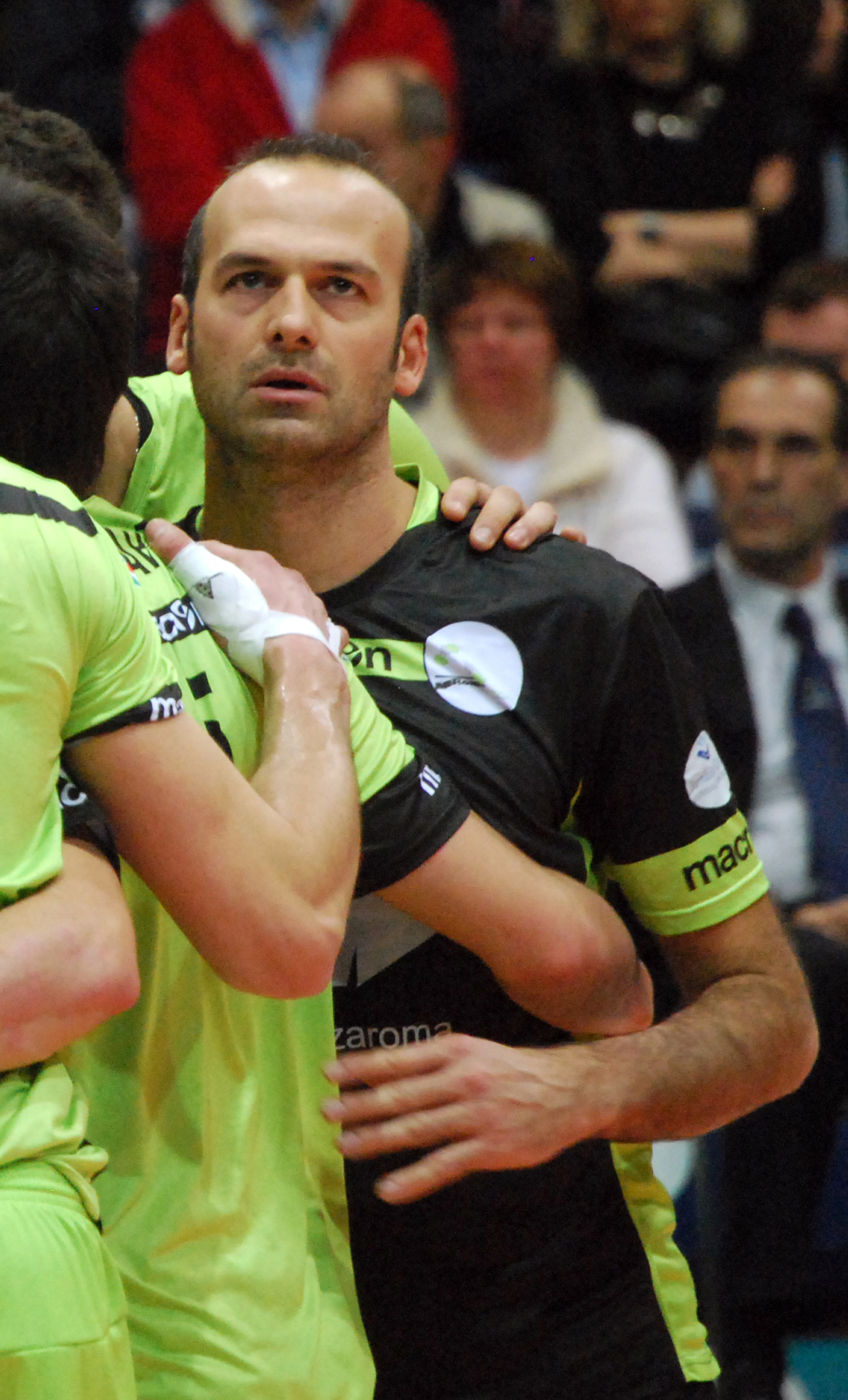

Personal information
- Born: 28 October 1973 (age 52) Casarano, Italy
Medal record
Men's volleyball
Representing Italy
Olympic Games
Bronze medal – third place	2000 Sydney	Team
World Championship
Gold medal – first place	1998 Japan	Team
European Championship
Gold medal – first place	1999 Vienna	Team
Gold medal – first place	2003 Berlin	Team
Gold medal – first place	2005 Rome/Belgrade	Team
Silver medal – second place	2001 Ostrava	Team

Mirko Corsano (born 28 October 1973) is a volleyball player from Italy, who won the bronze medal with the men's national team at the 2000 Summer Olympics. Playing as a libero, he claimed his first title for the Azzurri in 1999 at European Championship in Vienna, Austria.

== Awards ==
=== Individuals ===
- 2001 European Championship "Best Libero"
- 2005 European Championship "Best Libero"
- 2005 FIVB World Grand Champions Cup "Best Libero"
- 2008 Summer Olympics "Best Libero"
