= Josefa Idem =

German-born Italian canoeist and politician

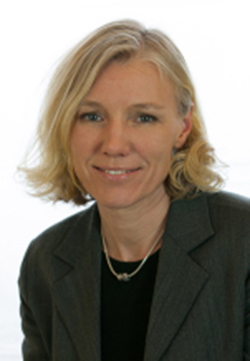

Personal information
- Full name: Josefa Idem Guerrini
- Nationality: Italian
- Born: 23 September 1964 (age 62) Goch, West Germany
- Home town: Santerno, Italy
- Height: 176 cm (5 ft 9 in)
- Weight: 67 kg (148 lb)

Sport
- Country: Italy
- Sport: Canoeing
- Event: Canoe racing
- Coached by: Gugliemo Guerrini
Medal record
Women's canoe sprint
Representing West Germany
Olympic Games
Bronze medal – third place	1984 Los Angeles	K-2 500 m
World Championships
Bronze medal – third place	1989 Plovdiv	K-1 500 m
Bronze medal – third place	1989 Plovdiv	K-1 5000 m
Representing Italy
Olympic Games
Gold medal – first place	2000 Sydney	K-1 500 m
Silver medal – second place	2004 Athens	K-1 500 m
Silver medal – second place	2008 Beijing	K-1 500 m
Bronze medal – third place	1996 Atlanta	K-1 500 m
World Championships
Gold medal – first place	1990 Poznań	K-1 500 m
Gold medal – first place	1991 Paris	K-1 5000 m
Gold medal – first place	1998 Szeged	K-1 1000 m
Gold medal – first place	2001 Poznań	K-1 500 m
Gold medal – first place	2001 Poznań	K-1 1000 m
Silver medal – second place	1990 Poznań	K-1 5000 m
Silver medal – second place	1997 Dartmouth	K-1 200 m
Silver medal – second place	1997 Dartmouth	K-1 500 m
Silver medal – second place	1997 Dartmouth	K-1 1000 m
Silver medal – second place	1998 Szeged	K-1 200 m
Silver medal – second place	1999 Milan	K-1 200 m
Silver medal – second place	1999 Milan	K-1 500 m
Silver medal – second place	1999 Milan	K-1 1000 m
Silver medal – second place	2006 Szeged	K-1 500 m
Bronze medal – third place	1991 Paris	K-1 500 m
Bronze medal – third place	1994 Mexico City	K-1 500 m
Bronze medal – third place	1998 Szeged	K-1 500 m
Bronze medal – third place	2002 Seville	K-1 500 m
Bronze medal – third place	2002 Seville	K-1 1000 m
Bronze medal – third place	2009 Dartmouth	K-1 500 m

Josefa Idem married Guerrini (born 23 September 1964) is an Italian canoe sprinter turned politician. Competing in eight Summer Olympics, she has five medals. Winning 35 international medals during her career, Idem was the first Italian woman to win World Championships (22 total, five gold) and Olympic medals in canoe sprint. At the 2009 world championships, she became the oldest medalist in the history of the world championships.

After her retirement, she was elected in 2013 as member of the Italian Parliament for the Democratic Party, and successively named Minister for Equal Opportunities, Sport and Youth Policies as part of the cabinet of Enrico Letta. On 24 June 2013, she resigned from the charge because of judicial investigation on allegedly unpaid taxes.

== Biography ==
Josefa Idem was born in Goch, West Germany, and began paddling at the age of eleven. In 1977, aged thirteen, she competed at the European Championships in Plovdiv and won gold medals over 200, 500 and 1000 metres as well as a bronze medal in doubles kayaking ("K-2") with Ravetta Rosette. In the following years she focused mainly on her language school education but competed for West Germany at the 1984 Olympics in Los Angeles, winning a bronze medal in the K-2 500 m with Barbara Schüttpelz. The next year, Idem switched to the K-1 events.

At the 1988 Olympics in Seoul, she finished ninth in the K-1 500 m and fifth with the West German quartet in the K-4 500 m. In November the same year Idem moved to Italy where she eventually met Gugliemo Guerrini, her present husband and coach. The cooperation paid off as she won two bronze medals at the 1989 World Championships in Plovdiv, the city where she won her first international medals.

Idem married Guerrini in 1990 and hence became an Italian citizen in 1992. She competed for Italy at the Olympic Games the same year, placing fourth. Four years later, however, at the 1996 Olympics in Atlanta, she won the bronze medal in the K-1 500 m event.

This was the beginning of her most successful period: from 1997 to 2002 she won three World Championships titles (as well as 10 silver and bronze medals), five European titles and finally the Olympic gold medal in Sydney 2000. In 2003, she gave birth to her second child, but she returned to compete in the K-1 500 m at the Games in Athens in 2004, winning the silver medal.

In her seventh Olympic appearance, at the 2008 Olympic Games in Beijing, at the age of 43, she won her fifth medal, the silver in K-1 500 m; after leading for much of the latter part of the race, she was overtaken at the very end by the Ukrainian kayaker, losing to her in a photo finish by only four thousandths of a second, 1:50.677 to 1:50.673. After the race she said that she wanted to continue until the 2012 Olympics in London. Idem qualified for the 2012 Olympics and ultimately achieved a 5th place in the finals.

Today Idem lives in Santerno (in the province of Ravenna), with Guglielmo Guerrini and their two children.

== Political involvement ==
From 2001 to 2007 she served as Ravenna city councillor delegate for sports (assessore in Italian), as member of the centre-left Olive Tree. She then became a member of the Democratic Party, being then named a parliamentary candidate for the Senate after winning the party's 2012 primary elections. She was elected into Parliament as a result of the 2013 general election.

On 28 April 2013, she was named a minister without portfolio for equal opportunities and sports as part of a grand coalition cabinet headed by Democratic Party member Enrico Letta. However, she resigned two months later on 24 June due to legal charges over allegedly unpaid taxes.

Idem has also been involved in social work, most prominently as a spokesperson for Emergency as well as Associazione Italiana Sclerosi Multipla, an organization for multiple sclerosis patients.

== Olympic medals ==
For Germany:

- 1984 Los Angeles: Bronze K2 500 m

For Italy:

- 1996 Atlanta: Bronze K1 500 m
- 2000 Sydney: Gold K1 500 m
- 2004 Athens: Silver K1 500 m
- 2008 Beijing: Silver K1 500 m

== See also ==
- List of athletes with the most appearances at Olympic Games
- Italian sportswomen multiple medalists at Olympics and World Championships
