= Miyuki Shirata =

Japanese canoeist (born 1984)

Miyuki Shirata (白田 美由希, Shirata Miyuki; born July 28, 1984) is a Japanese sprint canoer who competed in the mid-2000s. At the 2004 Summer Olympics in Athens, she was eliminated in the semifinals of the K-1 500 m event.
