= Marialaura Simonetto =

Italian swimmer

Personal information
- Born: November 11, 1987 (age 38)

Sport
- Sport: Swimming
Medal record
Representing Italy
Summer Universiade
Silver medal – second place	2009 Belgrade	4x100m medley relay
European Championships
Silver medal – second place	2008 Eindhoven	4x100m freestyle relay

Marialaura Simonetto (born 11 November 1987) is an Italian swimmer who competed in the 2008 Summer Olympics, but did not medal. She later completed medical school at the University of Padua before completing her neurology residency at Weill Cornell.
