= Yoshiko Shirata =

Japanese accounting scholar (born 1952)

Cindy Yoshiko Shirata
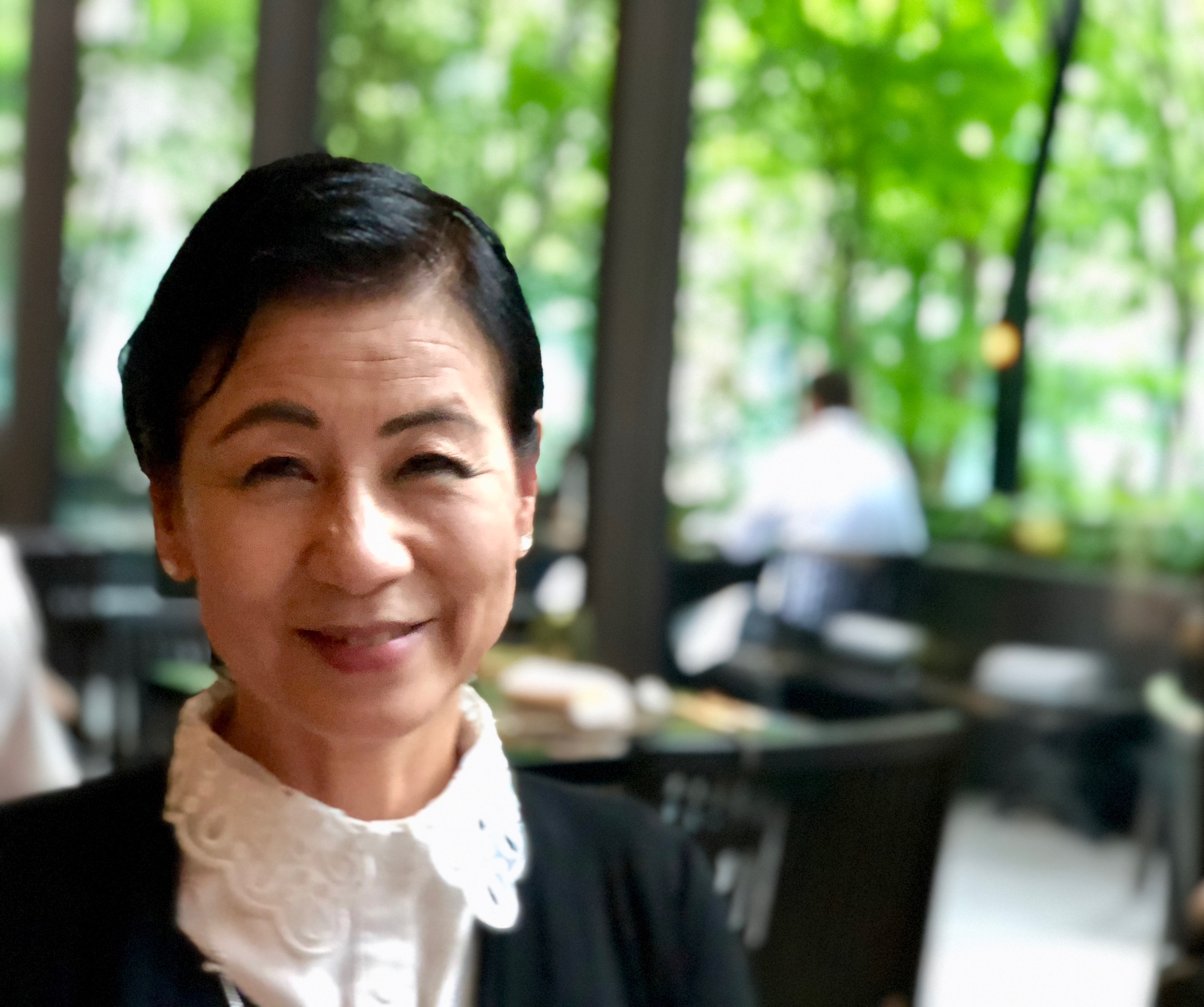
- Shirata in 2019
- Born: December 2, 1952 (age 73); Tokyo, Japan
- Education: University of Tsukuba
- Known for: SAF2002 bankruptcy prediction model

"Cindy" Yoshiko Shirata (born 2 December 1952) is a Japanese accounting scholar who specialized in corporate bankruptcy prediction. She is best known for her SAF2002 bankruptcy prediction model. Her bankruptcy prediction model has been used by major banks and rating companies in Japan. She is considered one of the most well-known experts to develop bankruptcy prediction models in Japan.

== Early life ==
After graduating from high school, Shirata first worked for Japan Airlines (JAL) as a cabin attendant in the 1970s. She then worked as an assistant to the Software Engineering Manager of Pr1me Computer Japan, and an advisor to the President of Spalding Japan, and as advisor to the vice-president of Teikoku Data Bank. Subsequently, she worked as a Managing Associate of Coopers and Lybrand Japan Co., Ltd.
Shirata graduated from the Doctoral Program in Management and Public Policy, University of Tsukuba. In 1994, she was awarded a Master of Business Administration (MBA) and in March 1999, a Doctor of Philosophy in Business Administration (DBA).

== Academic career ==
Shirata started teaching in 1995 as a part-time lecturer at University of Tsukuba, at Tsukuba College of Technology Japan and at Chuo Commerce College, Chuo University. From 1996 until 2005 she has been a part-time teacher at Ryutsu Keizai University. From 1996 to 2001 she was associate professor of accounting, Tsukuba College of Technology Japan and from 2001 until 2005 Professor of Accounting at Nihon University College of Economics. From 2005 to 2007 she was Professor of Accounting, Graduate School of Management Of Technology, at Shibaura Institute of Technology. From 2007 to 2014, she was Professor of Accounting, Graduate School of Business Sciences, University of Tsukuba Tokyo Campus. She is now the Specially Appointed Professor of Tokyo International University and also visiting professor of accounting at Toyo University.

Shirata has also been a visiting professor at various universities, such as LMU Munich, Germany, Sheffield University Management School, University of Sheffield, U.K., and visiting researcher at The Research Institute for Innovation Management, Hosei University, Japan.

=== Other activities ===
From 2006 to 2014, Shirata was a council member of the Science Council of Japan, nominated by the prime minister of Japan. She was also a secretary general of Science Council of Asia from 2011 to 2014.

At present, she holds various positions such as:

- Member of XBRL Japan, Education Committee
- Council Member, Legislative Council of the Ministry of Justice, Japan
- Member of the Board of Directors, Ryoden Trading Co., Ltd.
- Member of the Board of Directors, Japan Overseas Infrastructure Investment Corporation for Transport & Urban Development
- Auditor FamilyMart UNY Holdings
- Honorary Professor, Tokyo International University, Faculty of Commerce

=== Awards and recognition ===
On March 9, 2010, Dr. Shirata won the Best Faculty Member in 2009 Award from the University of Tsukuba.
On June 16, 2017, she was named a Lifetime Achiever by Marquis Who's Who endorsing her as a leader in the accounting education industry.

== The SAF2002 bankruptcy prediction model ==
In 2003, Dr. Shirata introduced the SAF2002 bankruptcy prediction model. The acronym SAF stands for Simple Analysis of Failure. The SAF2002 model was developed by analyzing the financial data of 1,436 bankrupt companies and 3,434 non-bankrupt companies extracted by a systematic sampling method from 107,034 companies. The variables for the model were selected by using a Classification and Regression Tree (CART) type of decision tree learning approach to analyze the financial data of Japanese companies that entered bankruptcy between 1992 and 2001. The four variables of the model that the CART approach identified are:

$(x_1)$ Retained Earnings to Total Liabilities and Owners’ Equity,
$(x_2)$ Net Income Before Tax to Total Liabilities and Owners’ Equity,
$(x_3)$ Inventory Turnover Period, and
$(x_4)$ Interest Expenses to Sales.

Based on a linear model, which exhibited the most stable and discriminant results, the model's SAF value for each firm is based on the following equation:

$$SAF = 0.01036x_1 + 0.02682x_2 + 0.06610x_3 + 0.02368x_4 + 0.70773$$

A SAF value of 0.7 or below quickly raises a firm's bankruptcy risk.

== Selected bibliography ==
- Extracting Key Phrases as Predictors of Corporate Bankruptcy: Empirical Analysis of Annual Reports by Text Mining, The Journal of Emerging Technologies in Accounting 8(1), December 2011, pp. 31–44.
- An Analysis of the "Going Concern Assumption": Text Mining from Japanese Financial Reports, The Journal of Emerging Technologies in Accounting 5(1), January 2009, pp. 1–16.
- Corporate Rehabilitation in Japan: Empirical Study, The Journal of Corporate Renewal, Vol.21 No.1, January 2008, pp. 18–24.
- Accounting Issues of Corporate Rehabilitation in Japan: Emprical Study, Proceedings of 19th Asia-Pacific Conference on International Accounting Issues, November 13, 2007, p. 64.
- Going Concern Criteria: Empirical Analysis of Qualitative Financial Data by Text Mining, Proceedings of 18th Asia-Pacific Conference on International Accounting Issues, October 23, 2006, p. 55.
- An Analysis of the "Going Concern Assumption": Text Mining from Japanese Financial Report, Proceedings of American Accounting Association 2006 Annual Meeting, August 9, 2006, p. 131.
- Impact of the Change in Accounting Principles on Financial Analysis: Empirical Studies, the 17th Asia-Pacific Conference on International Accounting Issues, November 21, 2005, #59:1-17.
- An Attempt to Rate Companies Based on Bankruptcy Prediction Model, the 16th Asia-Pacific Conference on International Accounting Issues, November 9, 2004.
- Predictors of Bankruptcy after Bubble Economy in Japan: What can we learn from Japan Case?, the 15th Asia-Pacific Conference on International Accounting Issues, November 24, 2003.
- The Relationship between Business Failure and Decision Making by Manager: Empirical Analysis, Proceedings of 13th Asian-Pacific Conference on International Accounting Issues, October 28, 2001. pp. 20–23.
- Reliability of Financial Ratio Analysis: The Empirical Study of Bankruptcy Firms in Japan, Proceedings of 2nd Asian Academic Accounting Association Conference, September 18, 2001.p. 16.
- Corporate Governance and Corporate Risks: An Inevitable Nuclear Accident in Japan, Proceeding of 12th Asian-Pacific Conference on Inter-national Accounting Issues, pp. 272–273. October 23, 2000.
- Peculiar behavior of Japanese bankrupt firms: Discovered by AI-based data mining technique, Proceeding of KES'2000 Knowledge- Based Intelligent Engineering System & Allied Technologies IEEE: pp. 663–666, August 30, 2001.
- Extracting Predictors of Corporate Bankruptcy: Empirical Study on Data Mining Methods, Knowledge Discovery and Data Mining: Lecture notes in Artificial intelligence: 1805: pp. 204–207, April 19, 2000, (Cindy Yoshiko SHIRATA, Takao TERANO).
- Bankruptcy Predictability of Japanese Public Financial Statements - Is it reliable?, Proceeding of 11th Asian-Pacific Conference on International Accounting Issues, pp. 197–200. November 23, 1999.
- Empirical Analysis: Prediction of Japanese Corporate Failure, Proceeding of 10th Asian-Pacific Conference on International Accounting Issues, pp. 132–135. October 29, 1998.
- Financial Ratios as Predictors of Bankruptcy in Japan: An Empirical Research. Proceedings of The Second Asian Pacific Interdisciplinary Research in Accounting Conference, pp. 437–445., August 4, 1998.
- Recent Tendency of Corporate Bankruptcy in Japan and the Necessity for Extension of Disclosure, System of Financial Information, Proceedings Tsukuba-Washington International Symposium on Management Issues and Challenges (TWAIN'96), pp. 211–227, July 29, 1996, (Cindy Yoshiko SHIRATA, Yoshito KAKO).
- The Study on the Financial Information Introduced Continuously Contemporary Accounting to Foresee the Corporate Bankruptcy, Proceedings, Tsukuba-Washington International Symposium on Management Issues and Challenges (TWAIN'94), pp. 91–101, July 12, 1994, (Cindy Yoshiko SHIRATA, Yoshito KAKO).
