= Fabiana Sgroi =

Italian canoeist

Fabiana Sgroi (born 13 May 1981 in Palermo) is an Italian sprint canoeist who competed in the late 2000s. At the 2008 Summer Olympics in Beijing, she finished eighth in the K-4 500 m event while being eliminated in the semifinals of the K-2 500 m event.
