= Romina Armellini =

Italian swimmer

Personal information
- Born: November 9, 1984 (age 41) Johannesburg, South Africa

Sport
- Sport: Swimming
- Strokes: Backstroke

Romina Armellini (born 9 November 1984) is an Italian backstroke swimmer who competed in the 2008 Summer Olympics.
