= Alberto Cisolla =

Italian volleyball player (born 1977)

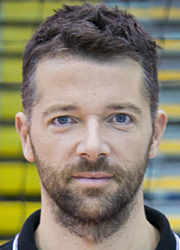
- Cisolla in 2017

Personal information
- Nationality: Italian
- Born: 10 October 1977 (age 49); Treviso, Italy
- Height: 1.97 m (6 ft 6 in)
- Weight: 87 kg (192 lb)
Honours
Men's volleyball
Representing Italy
Olympic Games
Silver medal – second place	2004 Athens	Team competition
World Cup
Silver medal – second place	2003 Japan	Team competition
European Championship
Gold medal – first place	2005 Serbia/Italy	Team competition

Alberto Cisolla (born 10 October 1977 in Treviso) is an Italian volleyball player.

Cisolla, standing at 1.97 m for 87 kg, plays passing-hitter for Callipo Sport.

He won six Italian titles, three European Champions cup, and, with Italian national team, one European Championship (2005, also declared MVP of the tournament). He won a silver medal as part of the Italian team at the 2004 Summer Olympics and also played in the team that came fourth at the 2008 Summer Olympics.

== Clubs ==
Club	Country	From	To
Sisley Treviso	Italy	1996–1997	2008-2009
Volley Lube	Italy	2009-2010	2009-2010
M. Roma Volley	Italy	2010-2011	2011-2012
Top Latina	Italy	2012-2013	2012-2013
Al-Muharraq SC	Bahrain	2013	2013
Callipo Vibo Valentia	Italy	2013-2014	...

== Individual awards ==
- 2005 European Championship "Most Valuable Player"

=== State awards ===
- 2004 Officer's Order of Merit of the Italian Republic

Awards
Preceded by (Italy) Andrea Sartoretti	Most Valuable Player of European Championship; 2005	Succeeded by (Russia) Semyon Poltavskiy
