= Alessandra Galiotto =

Italian canoeist (born 1983)

Alessandra Galiotto (born 28 September 1983 in Arzignano) is an Italian sprint canoer who competed in the late 2000s. At the 2008 Summer Olympics in Beijing, she finished eighth in the K-4 500 m event.
