= Lucy Hardy =

British canoeist

Lucy Hardy-Wainwright (born 5 May 1978) is a British canoe sprinter who has competed since the mid-2000s. Competing in two Summer Olympics, she earned her best finish of seventh in the K-1 500 m event twice (2004, 2008).
