= Alice Fagioli =

Italian canoeist

Alice Fagioli (born 11 June 1980) is an Italian sprint canoer who competed in the late 2000s. At the 2008 Summer Olympics in Beijing, she finished eighth in the K-4 500 m event.
