= Stefania Cicali =

Italian canoeist (born 1987)

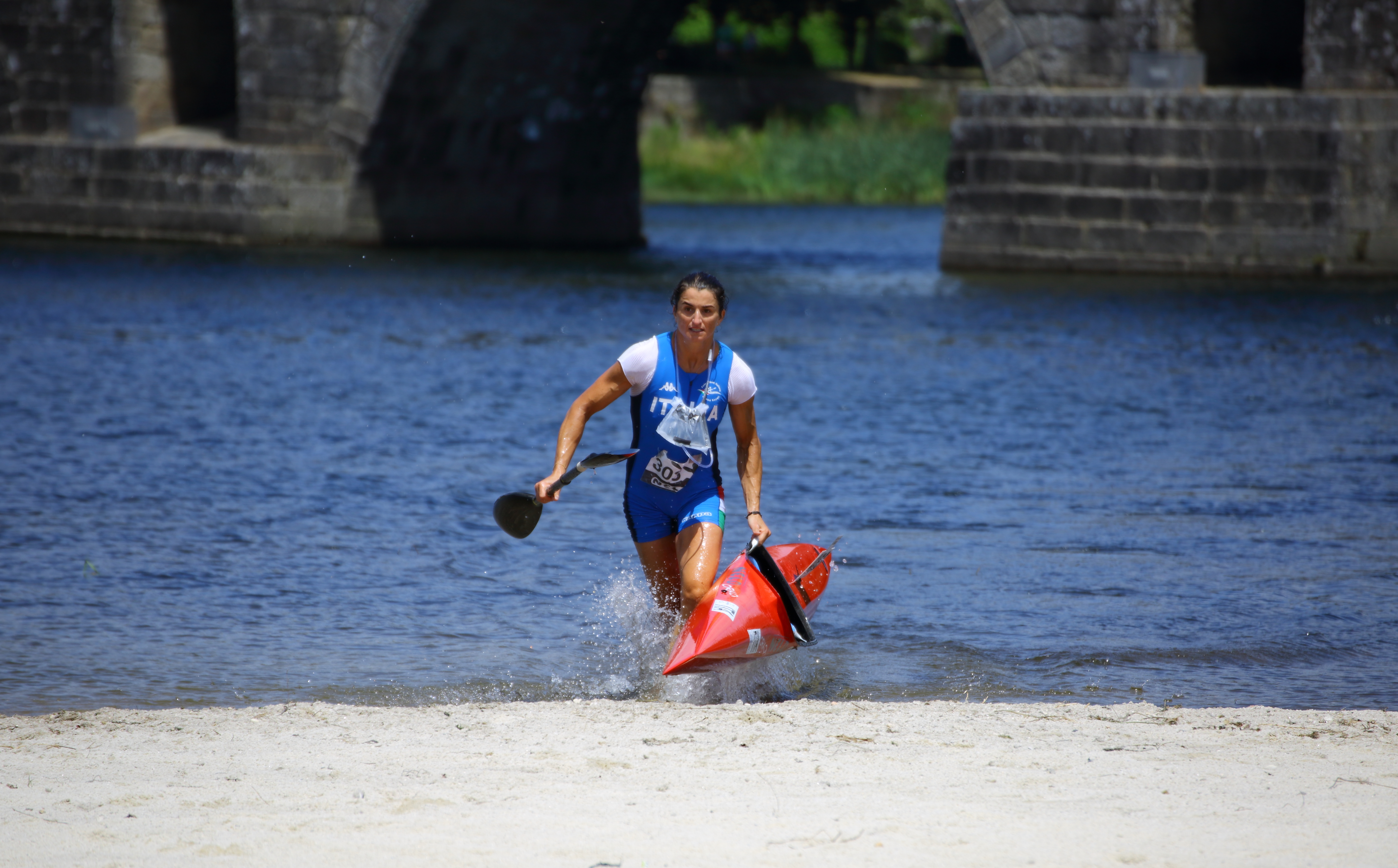
- Cicali in 2017

Personal information
- Nationality: Italian
- Born: 20 October 1987 (age 38) Bagno a Ripoli, Italy

Sport
- Sport: Canoeing
- Event: Canoe marathon
- Club: Fiamme Azzurre
Medal record
Women's canoe sprint
World Games
Silver medal – second place	2013 Cali	K-2 marathon

Stefania Cicali (born 20 October 1987) is an Italian sprint canoer and marathon canoeist who competed in the late 2000s. At the 2008 Summer Olympics in Beijing, she finished eighth in the K-4 500 m event while being eliminated in the semifinals of the K-2 500 m event.
