= Chantal Meek =

English-born Australian canoeist

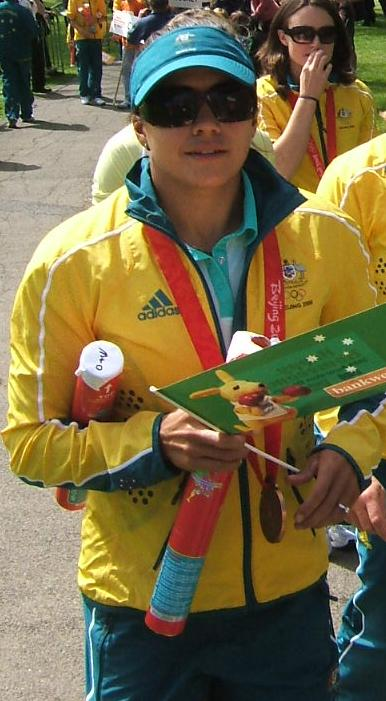
- Meek at the Welcome Home parade in Adelaide in September 2008

Personal information
- Life partner: Mark Minchin

Sport
- Country: Australia
Medal record
Women's canoe sprint
Olympic Games
Bronze medal – third place	2008 Beijing	K-4 500 m
World Championships
Bronze medal – third place	2003 Gainesville	K-4 1000 m

Chantal Meek (born 19 December 1978 in Kent, England) is an English-born Australian sprint canoeist and marathon canoeist who has competed since the mid-2000s. Competing in two Summer Olympics, she won a bronze medal in the K-4 500 m event at Beijing in 2008.

Meek also won a bronze medal in the K-4 1000 m event at the 2003 ICF Canoe Sprint World Championships in Gainesville. Chantal married Mark Minchin in 2008 and is now Chantal Minchin.
