= Athina-Theodora Alexopoulou =

Greek canoeist (born 1983)

Athina-Theodora Alexopoulou (Greek: Αθηνά-Θεοδορα Αλεξοπούλου) (born 17 March 1983 in Athens) is a Greek sprint canoer who competed in the mid-2000s. At the 2004 Summer Olympics in Athens, she was eliminated in the semifinals of the K-1 500 m event.
