= Canoeing at the 2008 Summer Olympics – Men's C-1 500 metres =

The men's C-1 500 metres competition in canoeing at the 2008 Summer Olympics took place at the Shunyi Olympic Rowing-Canoeing Park in Beijing. The C-1 event is raced in single-man sprint canoes. This would be the last time the event would take place at the Summer Olympics. On 13 August 2009, it was announced by the International Canoe Federation that the men's 500 m events would be replaced by 200 m events at the 2012 Summer Olympics with one of them being K-1 200 m for the women. The other events for men at 200 m will be C-1, C-2, and K-1.

Competition consists of three rounds: the heats, the semifinals, and the final. All boats compete in the heats. The top finisher in each of the three heats advances directly to the final, while the next six finishers (places 2 through 7) in each heat move on to the semifinals. The top three finishers in each of the two semifinals join the heats winners in the final.

Heats took place on August 19, semifinals on August 21, and finals on August 23.

== Schedule ==
All times are China Standard Time (UTC+8)

Date	Time	Round
Tuesday, August 19, 2008	16:10-16:40	Heats
Thursday, August 21, 2008	16:00-16:20	Semifinals
Saturday, August 23, 2008	15:45-16:00	Final

== Medalists ==
Gold	Silver	Bronze
Maxim Opalev (RUS)	David Cal (ESP)	Iurii Cheban (UKR)

== Results ==
=== Heats ===
Qualification Rules: 1->Final, 2..7->Semifinals, Rest Out

==== Heat 1 ====
Rank	Canoer	Country	Time	Notes
1	David Cal	Spain	1:48.095	QF
2	Florin Georgian Mironcic	Romania	1:48.608	QS
3	Yuriy Cheban	Ukraine	1:49.454	QS
4	Attila Vajda	Hungary	1:49.942	QS
5	Aldo Pruna	Cuba	1:51.111	QS
6	Nivalter Jesus	Brazil	1:51.363	QS
7	Torsten Lachmann	Australia	2:00.594	QS
8	Fortunato Luis Pacavira	Angola	2:13.265	

==== Heat 2 ====
Rank	Canoer	Country	Time	Notes
1	Aliaksandr Zhukouski	Belarus	1:48.669	QF
2	Mark Oldershaw	Canada	1:48.817	QS
3	Mathieu Goubel	France	1:49.527	QS
4	Andreas Dittmer	Germany	1:49.527	QS
5	Mikhail Yemelyanov	Kazakhstan	1:54.832	QS
6	Marián Ostrčil	Slovakia	1:55.911	QS
7	Calvin Mokoto	South Africa	2:03.372	QS

==== Heat 3 ====
Rank	Canoer	Country	Time	Notes
1	Maxim Opalev	Russia	1:47.849	QF
2	Li Qiang	China	1:49.164	QS
3	Paweł Baraszkiewicz	Poland	1:50.463	QS
4	Vadim Menkov	Uzbekistan	1:52.793	QS
5	Andreas Kiligkaridis	Greece	1:54.541	QS
6	Mikelis Ezmalis	Latvia	1:54.890	QS
7	Sean Pangelinan	Guam	2:12.696	QS

=== Semifinals ===
Qualification Rules: 1..3->Final, Rest Out

==== Semifinal 1 ====
Rank	Canoer	Country	Time	Notes
1	Yuriy Cheban	Ukraine	1:51.507	QF
2	Mathieu Goubel	France	1:52.239	QF
3	Li Qiang	China	1:52.887	QF
4	Andreas Dittmer	Germany	1:53.182	
5	Aldo Pruna	Cuba	1:53.809	
6	Vadim Menkov	Uzbekistan	1:55.610	
7	Nivalter Jesus	Brazil	1:56.139	
8	Marián Ostrčil	Slovakia	1:58.401	
9	Sean Pangelinan	Guam	2:17.940	

==== Semifinal 2 ====
Rank	Canoer	Country	Time	Notes
1	Attila Vajda	Hungary	1:51.029	QF
2	Florin Georgian Mironcic	Romania	1:51.535	QF
3	Paweł Baraszkiewicz	Poland	1:51.744	QF
4	Mark Oldershaw	Canada	1:52.649	
5	Andreas Kiligkaridis	Greece	1:56.310	
6	Mikelis Ezmalis	Latvia	1:56.907	
7	Torsten Lachmann	Australia	1:59.119	
8	Mikhail Yemelyanov	Kazakhstan	2:06.908	
9	Calvin Mokoto	South Africa	2:12.226	

=== Final ===
Rank	Canoer	Country	Time	Notes
Gold medal	Maxim Opalev	Russia	1:47.140	
Silver medal	David Cal	Spain	1:48.397	
Bronze medal	Yuriy Cheban	Ukraine	1:48.766	
4	Mathieu Goubel	France	1:49.056	
5	Aliaksandr Zhukouski	Belarus	1:49.092	
6	Li Qiang	China	1:49.287	
7	Florin Georgian Mironcic	Romania	1:49.861	
8	Paweł Baraszkiewicz	Poland	1:50.048	
9	Attila Vajda	Hungary	1:50.156	

Opalev's gold earned him a complete set of medals in this event, having won a silver in 2000 and a bronze in 2004.
