= Latvia at the 2008 Summer Olympics =

- IOC code: LAT
- NOC: Latvian Olympic Committee
- Website: www.olimpiade.lv (in Latvian and English)

in Beijing
- Competitors: 47 in 11 sports
- Flag bearers: Vadims Vasiļevskis (opening); Māris Štrombergs (closing)
- Medals Ranked 45th: Gold 1 Silver 1 Bronze 1 Total 3

Summer Olympics appearances (overview)
- 1924; 1928; 1932; 1936; 1948–1988; 1992; 1996; 2000; 2004; 2008; 2012; 2016; 2020; 2024

Other related appearances
- Russian Empire (1908–1912); Soviet Union (1952–1988)

Latvia was represented at the 2008 Summer Olympics in Beijing, China by the Latvian Olympic Committee.

In total, 47 athletes including 29 men and 18 women represented Latvia in 11 different sports including athletics, basketball, canoeing, cycling, judo, modern pentathlon, shooting, swimming, tennis, volleyball and weightlifting.

Latvia won a total three medals at the games after Māris Štrombergs won gold in the men's BMX, Ainārs Kovals won silver in the men's javelin throw and Viktors Ščerbatihs won bronze in the men's weightlifting.

== Competitors ==
In total, 47 athletes represented Latvia at the 2008 Summer Olympics in Beijing, China across 11 different sports.

Sport	Men	Women	Total
Athletics	12	5	17
Basketball	0	12	12
Canoeing	3	0	3
Cycling	5	0	5
Judo	2	0	2
Modern pentathlon	1	1	2
Shooting	1	0	1
Swimming	2	0	2
Tennis	1	0	1
Volleyball	2	0	2
Weightlifting	1	0	1
Total	29	18	47

== Medalists ==
Latvia won a total of three medals at the games after Māris Štrombergs won gold in the men's BMX, Ainārs Kovals won silver in the men's javelin throw and Viktors Ščerbatihs won bronze in the weightlifting men's +105 kg category.

Medal	Name	Sport	Event
Gold	Māris Štrombergs	Cycling	Men's BMX
Silver	Ainārs Kovals	Athletics	Men's javelin throw
Bronze	Viktors Ščerbatihs	Weightlifting	Men's +105 kg

== Athletics ==
In total, 17 Latvian athletes participated in the athletics events – Ronalds Arājs, Jolanta Dukure, Aiga Grabuste, Ingus Janevics, Jānis Karlivāns, Igors Kazakēvičs, Ainārs Kovals, Dmitrijs Miļkevičs, Staņislavs Olijars, Sinta Ozoliņa, Inna Poluškina, Ēriks Rags, Igors Sokolovs, Māris Urtāns, Vadims Vasiļevskis, Valērijs Žolnerovičs and Ieva Zunda.

Men
Track & road events

Athlete	Event	Heat		Quarterfinal		Semifinal		Final	
Athlete	Event	Result	Rank	Result	Rank	Result	Rank	Result	Rank
Ronalds Arājs	200 m	21.22	5	Did not advance					
Ingus Janevics	20 km walk	—						DNS	
Ingus Janevics	50 km walk	—						4:12:45	42
Igors Kazakēvičs	50 km walk	—						3:52:38	16
Dmitrijs Miļkevičs	800 m	1:47.12	4	—		Did not advance			
Staņislavs Olijars	110 m hurdles	DNS		Did not advance					
Valērijs Žolnerovičs	3,000 m steeplechase	8:37.65	10	—				Did not advance	

Field events

Athlete	Event	Qualification		Final	
Athlete	Event	Distance	Position	Distance	Position
Ainārs Kovals	Javelin throw	80.15	7 q	86.64	2nd place, silver medalist(s)
Ēriks Rags	Javelin throw	79.33	13	Did not advance	
Igors Sokolovs	Hammer throw	73.72	19	Did not advance	
Māris Urtāns	Shot put	19.57	25	Did not advance	
Vadims Vasiļevskis	Javelin throw	83.51	1 Q	81.32	9

Decathlon
Athlete	Event	100 m	LJ	SP	HJ	400 m	110H	DT	PV	JT	1500 m	Final	Rank
Jānis Karlivāns	Result	11.36	7.26	14.85	1.84	51.61	15.28	44.54	DNS	—	—	DNF	
Jānis Karlivāns	Points	782	876	780	661	742	816	757	0	—	—	DNF	

Women
Track & road events

Athlete	Event	Heat		Semifinal		Final	
Athlete	Event	Result	Rank	Result	Rank	Result	Rank
Jolanta Dukure	20 km walk	—				1:41:03	41
Inna Poluškina	3,000 m steeplechase	10:18.60	14	—		Did not advance	
Ieva Zunda	400 m hurdles	57.43	5	Did not advance			

Field events

Athlete	Event	Qualification		Final	
Athlete	Event	Distance	Position	Distance	Position
Sinta Ozoliņa	Javelin throw	60.13	12 q	53.38	11

Heptathlon
Athlete	Event	100H	HJ	SP	200 m	LJ	JT	800 m	Final	Rank
Aiga Grabuste	Result	13.78	1.77	12.70	24.71	6.36	39.02	2:16.87	6050 PB	19*
Aiga Grabuste	Points	1010	941	707	914	962	649	867	6050 PB	19*

* The athlete who finished in second place, Lyudmila Blonska of Ukraine, tested positive for a banned substance. Both the A and the B tests were positive, therefore Blonska was stripped of her silver medal, and Grabuste moved up a position.

== Basketball ==
In total, 12 Latvian athletes participated in the basketball events – Elīna Babkina, Gunta Baško, Aija Brumermane, Zane Eglīte, Anda Eibele, Liene Jansone, Anete Jēkabsone-Žogota, Dita Krūmberga, Ieva Kubliņ, Aija Putniņa, Zane Tamane and Ieva Tāre in the women's tournament.

Group play

Pos	Team	Pld	W	L	PF	PA	PD	Pts	Qualification
1	Australia	5	5	0	424	319	+105	10	Quarterfinals
2	Russia	5	4	1	339	333	+6	9	Quarterfinals
3	Belarus	5	2	3	324	332	−8	7 (Note: Head-to-head record: Belarus 1–0 South Korea)	Quarterfinals
4	South Korea	5	2	3	327	360	−33	7	Quarterfinals
5	Latvia	5	1	4	334	387	−53	6 (Note: Head-to-head record: Latvia 1–0 Brazil)	
6	Brazil	5	1	4	337	354	−17	6	

Source: FIBA archive
Rules for classification: 1) points; 2) head-to-head points; 3) head-to-head goal average; 4) head-to-head number of points scored.
Notes:

9 August 2008
22:15

Report

Latvia	57–62	Russia
Scoring by quarter: 7–14, 24–15, 17–12, 9–21
Pts: Jansone 24; Rebs: Tamane 6, Kubliņa 6 Asts: Jēkabsone-Žogota 6		Pts: Shchegoleva 12, Korstin 12; Rebs: Shchegoleva 12; Asts: Rakhmatulina 5

Wukesong Indoor Stadium, Beijing
Attendance: 11,083
Referees: Pablo Estevez (ARG)

11 August 2008
16:45

Report

Latvia	57–79	Belarus
Scoring by quarter: 20–21, 15–19, 14–20, 8–19
Pts: Baško 19; Rebs: Jansone, Kubliņa, Tamane 6 Asts: Eglīte 3		Pts: Leuchanka 22; Rebs: Verameyenka 9 Asts: Marchanka 5

Wukesong Indoor Stadium, Beijing
Attendance: 11,083
Referees: Ilija Belosevic (SRB)

13 August 2008
14:30

Report

Brazil	78–79	Latvia
Scoring by quarter: 23–14, 13–17, 23–26, 19–22
Pts: Zakrzeski 16; Rebs: Santos, Zakrzeski 9 Asts: Pinto 4		Pts: Jēkabsone 25; Rebs: Kubliņa 7 Asts: Jēkabsone 5

Wukesong Indoor Stadium, Beijing
Attendance: 11,083
Referees: Reynaldo Mercedes (DOM)

15 August 2008
11:15

Report

Latvia	73–96	Australia
Scoring by quarter: 18–19, 20–22, 18–35, 17–20
Pts: Tāre 14; Rebs: Brumermane, Jansone 5 Asts: Tāre 4		Pts: Jackson 30; Rebs: Taylor 11; Asts: Harrower, Taylor 4

Wukesong Indoor Stadium, Beijing
Attendance: 11,083
Referees: Pablo Estevez (ARG)

17 August 2008
14:30

Report

South Korea	72–68	Latvia
Scoring by quarter: 20–22, 22–13, 18–9, 12–24
Pts: Park 17; Rebs: Lee 10; Asts: Lee 4		Pts: Jēkabsone-Žogota 22; Rebs: Tamane 11; Asts: Jēkabsone-Žogota 5

Wukesong Indoor Stadium, Beijing
Attendance: 11,083
Referees: Jose Carreon (PUR)

== Canoeing ==
In total, three Latvian athletes participated in the canoeing events – Miķelis Ežmalis in the men's C-1 500 m and the Men's C-1 1,000 m and Krists Straume and Kristaps Zaļupe in the men's K-2 500 m and the Men's K-2 1,000 m.

Athlete	Event	Heats		Semifinals		Final	
Athlete	Event	Time	Rank	Time	Rank	Time	Rank
Miķelis Ežmalis	Men's C-1 500 m	1:54.890	6 QS	1:56.907	6	Did not advance	
Miķelis Ežmalis	Men's C-1 1,000 m	4:13.777	4 QS	4:16.820	9	Did not advance	
Krists Straume; Kristaps Zaļupe	Men's K-2 500 m	1:31.020	4 QS	1:32.649	4	Did not advance	
Krists Straume; Kristaps Zaļupe	Men's K-2 1,000 m	3:23.198	5 QS	3:23.408	1 Q	3:19.387	7

Qualification Legend: QS = Qualify to semi-final; QF = Qualify directly to final

== Cycling ==
In total, five Latvian athletes participated in the cycling events – Raivis Belohvoščiks, Ivo Lakučs, Artūrs Matisons, Gatis Smukulis and Māris Štrombergs.

=== Road ===
Athlete	Event	Time	Rank
Raivis Belohvoščiks	Men's road race	Did not finish	
Raivis Belohvoščiks	Men's time trial	1:08:54	36
Gatis Smukulis	Men's road race	6:36:48	68

=== BMX ===
Athlete	Event	Seeding		Quarterfinals		Semifinals		Final	
Athlete	Event	Result	Rank	Points	Rank	Points	Rank	Result	Rank
Ivo Lakučs	Men's BMX	36.509	16	21	8	Did not advance			
Artūrs Matisons	Men's BMX	36.072	4	6	2 Q	22	7	Did not advance	
Māris Štrombergs	Men's BMX	35.910	2	7	1 Q	3	1 Q	36.190	1st place, gold medalist(s)

== Judo ==
In total, two Latvian athletes participated in the judo events – Jevgeņijs Borodavko in the men's −90 kg category and Vsevolods Zeļonijs in the men's −73 kg category.

Athlete	Event	Round of 32	Round of 16	Quarterfinals	Semifinals	Repechage 1	Repechage 2	Repechage 3	Final / BM	
Athlete	Event	Opposition Result	Opposition Result	Opposition Result	Opposition Result	Opposition Result	Opposition Result	Opposition Result	Opposition Result	Rank
Vsevolods Zeļonijs	Men's −73 kg	Wiłkomirski (POL); L 0010–0020	Did not advance							
Jevgeņijs Borodavko	Men's −90 kg	Meloni (ITA); L 0010–0100	Did not advance							

== Modern pentathlon ==
In total, two Latvian athletes participated in the modern pentathlon events – Deniss Čerkovskis in the men's competition and Jeļena Rubļevska in the women's competition.

Athlete	Event	Shooting (10 m air pistol)			Fencing (épée one touch)			Swimming (200 m freestyle)			Riding (show jumping)			Running (3000 m)			Total points	Final rank
Athlete	Event	Points	Rank	MP Points	Results	Rank	MP points	Time	Rank	MP points	Penalties	Rank	MP points	Time	Rank	MP Points	Total points	Final rank
Deniss Čerkovskis	Men's	184	12	1144	15–20	24	760	2:10.46	29	1236	112	9	1088	9:29.96	13	1124	5352	11
Jeļena Rubļevska	Women's	181	35	908	27–8	2	1048	2:22.94	25	1208	220	31	980	10:49.35	18	1124	5268	23

== Shooting ==
In total, one Latvian athlete participated in the shooting events – Afanasijs Kuzmins in the men's 25 m rapid fire pistol.

Athlete	Event	Qualification		Final	
Athlete	Event	Points	Rank	Points	Rank
Afanasijs Kuzmins	25 m rapid fire pistol	565	17	Did not advance	

== Swimming ==
In total, two Latvian athletes participated in the swimming events – Andrejs Dūda in the men's 100 m butterfly and the men's 200 m individual medley and Romāns Miloslavskis in the men's 100 m freestyle and men's 200 m freestyle.

Athlete	Event	Heat		Semifinal		Final	
Athlete	Event	Time	Rank	Time	Rank	Time	Rank
Andrejs Dūda	100 m butterfly	55.20	59	Did not advance			
Andrejs Dūda	200 m individual medley	2:04.18	38	Did not advance			
Romāns Miloslavskis	100 m freestyle	50.40	46	Did not advance			
Romāns Miloslavskis	200 m freestyle	1:48.41	25	Did not advance			

== Tennis ==
In total, one Latvian athletes participated in the tennis events – Ernests Gulbis in the men's singles.

Athlete	Event	Round of 64	Round of 32	Round of 16	Quarterfinals	Semifinals	Final / BM	
Athlete	Event	Opposition Score	Opposition Score	Opposition Score	Opposition Score	Opposition Score	Opposition Score	Rank
Ernests Gulbis	Men's singles	Davydenko (RUS); L 4–6, 2–6	Did not advance					

== Volleyball ==
In total, two Latvian athletes participated in the volleyball events – Mārtiņš Pļaviņš and Aleksandrs Samoilovs in the beach volleyball men's tournament.

Athlete	Event	Preliminary round	Standing	Round of 16	Quarterfinals	Semifinals	Final / BM	
Athlete	Event	Opposition Score	Standing	Opposition Score	Opposition Score	Opposition Score	Opposition Score	Rank
Mārtiņš Pļaviņš; Aleksandrs Samoilovs	Men's	Pool B Dalhausser – Rogers (USA); W 2 – 0 (21–19, 21–18); Baracetti – Conde (ARG); L 0 – 2 (21–23, 19–21); Heuscher – Heyer (SUI); W 2 – 1 (21–17, 21–23, 15–13)	1 Q	Gosch – Horst (AUT); L 0 – 2 (17–21, 18–21)	Did not advance			

== Weightlifting ==
In total, one Latvian athlete participated in the weightlifting events – Viktors Ščerbatihs in the men's +105 kg category.

Athlete	Event	Snatch		Clean & Jerk		Total	Rank
Athlete	Event	Result	Rank	Result	Rank	Total	Rank
Viktors Ščerbatihs	Men's +105 kg	206	3	242	3	448	3rd place, bronze medalist(s)
