= Canoeing at the 2008 Summer Olympics – Men's K-2 500 metres =

The men's K-2 500 metres competition in canoeing at the 2008 Summer Olympics took place at the Shunyi Olympic Rowing-Canoeing Park in Beijing. The K-2 event is raced in two-person kayaks. This would be the last time the event would take place at the Summer Olympics. On 13 August 2009, it was announced by the International Canoe Federation that the men's 500 m events would be replaced by 200 m events at the 2012 Summer Olympics with one of them being K-1 200 m for the women. The other events for men at 200 m will be C-1, C-2, and K-1.

Competition consists of three rounds: the heats, the semifinals, and the final. All boats compete in the heats. The top three finishers in each of the two heats advances directly to the final, while the nine fastest times in both heats move on to the semifinals. The top three finishers in the semifinal join the heats winners in the final.

Heats took place on August 19, semifinals took place on August 21, and finals on August 23.

== Schedule ==
All times are China Standard Time (UTC+8)

Date	Time	Round
Tuesday, August 19, 2008	17:10-17:30	Heats
Thursday, August 21, 2008	16:40-16:50	Semifinal
Saturday, August 23, 2008	16:35-16:50	Final

== Medalists ==
Gold	Silver	Bronze
Saúl Craviotto and Carlos Pérez (ESP)	Ronald Rauhe and Tim Wieskötter (GER)	Raman Piatrushenka and Vadzim Makhneu (BLR)

== Results ==
=== Heats ===
Qualification Rules: 1..3->Final, 4..7->Semifinal + 8th best time, Rest Out

==== Heat 1 ====
Rank	Athletes	Country	Time	Notes
1	Ronald Rauhe, Tim Wieskötter	Germany	1:28.736	QF
2	Vincent Lecrubier, Sébastien Jouve	France	1:29.805	QF
3	Andrea Facchin, Antonio Massimiliano Scaduto	Italy	1:30.240	QF
4	Krists Straume, Kristaps Zalupe	Latvia	1:31.020	QS
5	Alvydas Duonėla, Egidijus Balčiūnas	Lithuania	1:31.232	QS
6	Clint Robinson, Jacob Clear	Australia	1:31.712	QS
7	Alexey Dergunov, Dmitriy Kaltenberger	Kazakhstan	1:33.363	QS
8	Shen Jie, Huang Zhipeng	China	1:34.432	

==== Heat 2 ====
Rank	Athletes	Country	Time	Notes
1	Raman Piatrushenka, Vadzim Makhneu	Belarus	1:28.661	QF
2	Saúl Craviotto, Carlos Perez	Spain	1:28.983	QF
3	Zoltán Kammerer, Gábor Kucsera	Hungary	1:30.099	QF
4	Richard Dober, Jr., Andrew Willows	Canada	1:30.234	QS
5	Kim Wraae Knudsen, René Holten Poulsen	Denmark	1:30.348	QS
6	Marek Twardowski, Adam Wysocki	Poland	1:32.107	QS
7	Mika Hokajärvi, Kalle Mikkonen	Finland	1:33.785	QS
8	José Giovanni Ramos, Gabriel Rodríguez	Venezuela	1:34.220	QS

=== Semifinal ===
Qualification Rules: 1..3->Final, Rest Out

Rank	Athletes	Country	Time	Notes
1	Richard Dober, Jr., Andrew Willows	Canada	1:31.232	QF
2	Marek Twardowski, Adam Wysocki	Poland	1:31.481	QF
3	Kim Wraae Knudsen, René Holten Poulsen	Denmark	1:31.796	QF
4	Krists Straume, Kristaps Zaļupe	Latvia	1:32.649	
5	Alvydas Duonėla, Egidijus Balčiūnas	Lithuania	1:32.887	
6	Alexey Dergunov, Dmitriy Kaltenberger	Kazakhstan	1:33.512	
7	Clint Robinson, Jacob Clear	Australia	1:33.839	
8	Mika Hokajärvi, Kalle Mikkonen	Finland	1:34.994	
9	José Giovanni Ramos, Gabriel Rodríguez	Venezuela	1:37.285	

=== Final ===
Rank	Athletes	Country	Time	Notes
Gold medal	Saúl Craviotto, Carlos Perez	Spain	1:28.736	
Silver medal	Ronald Rauhe, Tim Wieskötter	Germany	1:28.827	
Bronze medal	Raman Piatrushenka, Vadzim Makhneu	Belarus	1:30.005	
4	Zoltán Kammerer, Gábor Kucsera	Hungary	1:30.285	
5	Kim Wraae Knudsen, René Holten Poulsen	Denmark	1:30.569	
6	Richard Dober, Jr., Andrew Willows	Canada	1:30.857	
7	Vincent Lecrubier, Sébastien Jouve	France	1:31.312	
8	Marek Twardowski, Adam Wysocki	Poland	1:31.869	
9	Andrea Facchin, Antonio Massimiliano Scaduto	Italy	1:31.934	
