= Canoeing at the 2008 Summer Olympics – Men's C-1 1000 metres =

The men's C-1 1000 metres competition in canoeing at the 2008 Summer Olympics took place at the Shunyi Olympic Rowing-Canoeing Park in Beijing between August 18 and 22. The C-1 event is raced in single-man sprint canoes.

Competition consists of three rounds: the heats, the semifinals, and the final. All boats compete in the heats. The top finisher in each of the three heats advances directly to the final, while the next six finishers (places 2 through 7) in each heat move on to the semifinals. The top three finishers in each of the two semifinals join the heats winners in the final.

Heats took place on August 18, semifinals on August 20, and the final on August 22.

== Medalists ==
| Gold | Silver | Bronze |
| Attila Vajda (HUN) | David Cal (ESP) | Thomas Hall (CAN) |

== Schedule ==
All times are China Standard Time (UTC+8)

| Date | Time | Round |
|---|---|---|
| Monday, August 18, 2008 | 16:00-16:30 | Heats |
| Wednesday, August 20, 2008 | 15:50-16:10 | Semifinals |
| Friday, August 22, 2008 | 15:45-16:00 | Final |

== Results ==
=== Heats ===
Qualification Rules: 1->Final, 2..7->Semifinals, Rest Out

==== Heat 1 ====
| Rank | Canoer | Country | Time | Notes |
|---|---|---|---|---|
| 1 | Attila Vajda | Hungary | 3:55.319 | QF |
| 2 | Florin Georgian Mironcic | Romania | 3:57.538 | QS |
| 3 | Marcin Grzybowski | Poland | 4:02.010 | QS |
| 4 | Miķelis Ežmalis | Latvia | 4:13.777 | QS |
| 5 | Torsten Lachmann | Australia | 4:15.188 | QS |
| 6 | Everardo Cristóbal | Mexico | 4:15.280 | QS |
| 7 | Fortunato Luis Pacavira | Angola | 4:39.538 | QS |
| 8 | Sean Pangelinan | Guam | 4:49.284 | |

==== Heat 2 ====
| Rank | Canoer | Country | Time | Notes |
|---|---|---|---|---|
| 1 | Vadim Menkov | Uzbekistan | 3:56.793 | QF |
| 2 | Mathieu Goubel | France | 3:56.972 | QS |
| 3 | Marián Ostrčil | Slovakia | 4:00.191 | QS |
| 4 | Aliaksandr Zhukouski | Belarus | 4:01.380 | QS |
| 5 | Viktor Melantiev | Russia | 4:03.316 | QS |
| 6 | Nivalter Santos | Brazil | 4:17.407 | QS |
| 7 | Mikhail Yemelyanov | Kazakhstan | 4:19.259 | QS |

==== Heat 3 ====
| Rank | Canoer | Country | Time | Notes |
|---|---|---|---|---|
| 1 | David Cal | Spain | 3:58.756 | QF |
| 2 | Andreas Dittmer | Germany | 4:00.505 | QS |
| 3 | Aldo Pruna Díaz | Cuba | 4:02.351 | QS |
| 4 | Thomas Hall | Canada | 4:05.198 | QS |
| 5 | Andreas Kiligkaridis | Greece | 4:18.488 | QS |
| 6 | Yuriy Cheban | Ukraine | 4:23.188 | QS |
| 7 | Calvin Mokoto | South Africa | 4:33.887 | QS |

=== Semifinals ===
Qualification Rules: 1..3->Final, Rest Out

==== Semifinal 1 ====
| Rank | Canoer | Country | Time | Notes |
|---|---|---|---|---|
| 1 | Thomas Hall | Canada | 3:58.820 | QF |
| 2 | Florin Georgian Mironcic | Romania | 3:59.664 | QF |
| 3 | Aldo Pruna Díaz | Cuba | 4:01.745 | QF |
| 4 | Viktor Melantiev | Russia | 4:02.854 | |
| 5 | Marián Ostrčil | Slovakia | 4:03.696 | |
| 6 | Everardo Cristóbal | Mexico | 4:04.267 | |
| 7 | Yuriy Cheban | Ukraine | 4:06.095 | |
| 8 | Mikhail Yemelyanov | Kazakhstan | 4:16.813 | |
| 9 | Miķelis Ežmalis | Latvia | 4:16.820 | |

==== Semifinal 2 ====
| Rank | Canoer | Country | Time | Notes |
|---|---|---|---|---|
| 1 | Mathieu Goubel | France | 3:57.607 | QF |
| 2 | Andreas Dittmer | Germany | 3:58.595 | QF |
| 3 | Aliaksandr Zhukouski | Belarus | 3:58.851 | QF |
| 4 | Marcin Grzybowski | Poland | 4:00.226 | |
| 5 | Andreas Kiligkaridis | Greece | 4:04.627 | |
| 6 | Torsten Lachmann | Australia | 4:09.792 | |
| 7 | Nivalter Santos | Brazil | 4:12.556 | |
| 8 | Calvin Mokoto | South Africa | 4:26.650 | |
| 9 | Fortunato Luis Pacavira | Angola | 4:40.697 | |

=== Final ===
| Rank | Canoer | Country | Time | Notes |
|---|---|---|---|---|
| 1st place, gold medalist(s) | Attila Vajda | Hungary | 3:50.467 | |
| 2nd place, silver medalist(s) | David Cal | Spain | 3:52.751 | |
| 3rd place, bronze medalist(s) | Thomas Hall | Canada | 3:53.653 | |
| 4 | Vadim Menkov | Uzbekistan | 3:54.237 | |
| 5 | Aliaksandr Zhukouski | Belarus | 3:55.645 | |
| 6 | Florin Georgian Mironcic | Romania | 3:57.876 | |
| 7 | Mathieu Goubel | France | 3:57.889 | |
| 8 | Andreas Dittmer | Germany | 3:57.894 | |
| 9 | Aldo Pruna Díaz | Cuba | 3:59.087 | |

Menkov led for the early part of the race, but was passed at the 750 meter mark by defending Olympic champion Cal and defending world champion Vajda. The Hungarian pulled away in the final 150 meters to win his gold medal which he dedicated to his fallen teammate György Kolonics, who had died a month earlier training for the 2008 Summer Olympics.
