= Canoeing at the 2004 Summer Olympics – Men's C-1 500 metres =

These are the results of the men's C-1 500 metres competition in canoeing at the 2004 Summer Olympics. The C-1 event is raced by single-man sprint canoes.

== Medalists ==
Gold	Silver	Bronze
Andreas Dittmer (GER)	David Cal (ESP)	Maxim Opalev (RUS)

== Heats ==
The 19 competitors first raced in three heats. The first-place finishers from each of the heats advanced directly to the final, and the remaining 16 canoers moved on to the two semifinal races. The heats were raced on August 24.

Heat	Place	Athlete	Country	Time	Notes
1	1	Andreas Dittmer	Germany	1:49.146	QF
1	2	Martin Marinov	Australia	1:49.698	QS
1	3	Aldo Pruna Diaz	Cuba	1:50.246	QS
1	4	Aliaksandr Zhukouski	Belarus	1:50.378	QS
1	5	Andreas Kiligkaridis	Greece	1:53.662	QS
1	6	Yuriy Cheban	Ukraine	2:00.238	QS
1	7	Darwin Correa	Uruguay	2:02.014	QS
2	1	Maxim Opalev	Russia	1:48.144	QF
2	2	Dagnis Vinogradovs	Latvia	1:50.776	QS
2	3	Florin Georgian Mironcic	Romania	1:51.568	QS
2	4	Wang Bing	China	1:51.920	QS
2	5	Emanuel Horvaticek	Croatia	1:55.528	QS
2	6	Kaissar Nurmaganbetov	Kazakhstan	1:55.636	QS
3	1	David Cal	Spain	1:48.397	QF
3	2	Martin Doktor	Czech Republic	1:49.557	QS
3	3	Richard Dalton	Canada	1:50.005	QS
3	4	Márton Joób	Hungary	1:51.025	QS
3	5	Stanimir Atanasov	Bulgaria	1:52.917	QS
3	6	Marián Ostrčil	Slovakia	1:58.357	QS

== Semifinals ==
The top three finishers in each of the two semifinals qualified for the final, joining the three first-place finishers from the initial heats. Fourth place and higher competitors were eliminated. The semifinals were raced on August 26.

Semifinal 1
1.	Martin Doktor (CZE)	1:50.253	QF
2.	Márton Joób (HUN)	1:50.813	QF
3.	Wang Bing (CHN)	1:51.649	QF
4.	Aldo Pruna Diaz (CUB)	1:53.229
5.	Kaissar Nurmaganbetov (KAZ)	1:53.333
6.	Yuriy Cheban (UKR)	1:53.385
7.	Andreas Kiligkaridis (GRE)	1:53.793
8.	Florin Georgian Mironcic (ROU)	1:53.957
Semifinal 2
1.	Aliaksandr Zhukouski (BLR)	1:50.563	QF
2.	Stanimir Atanasov (BUL)	1:50.631	QF
3.	Richard Dalton (CAN)	1:51.027	QF
4.	Martin Marinov (AUS)	1:51.219
5.	Dagnis Vinogradovs (LAT)	1:52.511
6.	Marián Ostrčil (SVK)	1:52.871
7.	Darwin Correa (URU)	1:58.727
8.	Emanuel Horvaticek (CRO)	2:06.347

== Final ==
The final was raced on August 28.

Gold	Andreas Dittmer (GER)	1:46.383
Silver	David Cal (ESP)	1:46.723
Bronze	Maxim Opalev (RUS)	1:47.767
4.	Aliaksandr Zhukouski (BLR)	1:47.903
5.	Martin Doktor (CZE)	1:47.999
6.	Richard Dalton (CAN)	1:48.103
7.	Márton Joób (HUN)	1:48.195
8.	Stanimir Atanasov (BUL)	1:49.759
9.	Wang Bing (CHN)	1:49.903

Dittmar learned his lesson from the previous day in letting Cal get out to far ahead in the C-1 1000 m event by staying close to the Spaniard through the entire race before winning his third Olympic gold medal.
