= Latvia at the 2004 Summer Olympics =

- IOC code: LAT
- NOC: Latvian Olympic Committee
- Website: www.olimpiade.lv (in Latvian and English)

in Athens
- Competitors: 32 in 11 sports
- Flag bearer: Vadims Vasiļevskis
- Medals Ranked 58th: Gold 0 Silver 4 Bronze 0 Total 4

Summer Olympics appearances (overview)
- 1924; 1928; 1932; 1936; 1948–1988; 1992; 1996; 2000; 2004; 2008; 2012; 2016; 2020; 2024

Other related appearances
- Russian Empire (1908–1912); Soviet Union (1952–1988)

Latvia competed at the 2004 Summer Olympics in Athens, Greece, from 13 to 29 August 2004. This was the nation's eighth appearance at the Summer Olympics.

The Latvian Olympic Committee sent the nation's smallest delegation to the Games since the breakup of the Soviet Union. A total of 32 athletes, 22 men and 10 women, competed only in 11 sports. Fourteen athletes had previously competed in Sydney, including silver medalist Aigars Fadejevs in men's race walk, defending Olympic champion Igors Vihrovs in men's floor exercises, and judoka and bronze medalist Vsevolods Zeļonijs. Pistol shooter and former Olympic champion Afanasijs Kuzmins, the oldest of the team, at age 57, became the first Latvian athlete to compete in seven Olympic games (including three of his appearances under the Soviet Union). Meanwhile, javelin thrower and Latvia's top Olympic medal contender Vadims Vasiļevskis was appointed by the committee to become the nation's flag bearer in the opening ceremony.

Latvia left Athens with a total of four Olympic silver medals, surpassing a single short of the overall tally from Sydney. Three of these medals were awarded to the athletes for the first time in men's javelin throw, modern pentathlon, and weightlifting. Gymnast Jevgēņijs Saproņenko claimed another sporting medal for his team with a silver in the men's vault exercises, adding it to a prestigious gold from Igors Vihrovs in Sydney four years earlier.

== Medalists ==
Medal	Name	Sport	Event	Date
Silver	Jevgēņijs Saproņenko	Gymnastics	Men's vault	August 23
Silver	Viktors Ščerbatihs	Weightlifting	Men's +105 kg	August 25
Silver	Jeļena Rubļevska	Modern pentathlon	Women's event	August 27
Silver	Vadims Vasiļevskis	Athletics	Men's javelin throw	August 28

== Athletics ==
Latvian athletes have so far achieved qualifying standards in the following athletics events (up to a maximum of 3 athletes in each event at the 'A' Standard, and 1 at the 'B' Standard).

Key

- Note – Ranks given for track events are within the athlete's heat only
- Q = Qualified for the next round
- q = Qualified for the next round as a fastest loser or, in field events, by position without achieving the qualifying target
- NR = National record
- N/A = Round not applicable for the event
- Bye = Athlete not required to compete in round

Men
Track & road events

Athlete	Event	Heat		Quarterfinal		Semifinal		Final	
Athlete	Event	Result	Rank	Result	Rank	Result	Rank	Result	Rank
Aigars Fadejevs	20 km walk	—						1:22:08	9
Aigars Fadejevs	50 km walk	—						3:52:52	11
Modris Liepiņš	50 km walk	—						4:04:26	25
Dmitrijs Miļkevičs	800 m	1:46.66	=1 Q	—		1:46.62	6	Did not advance	
Staņislavs Olijars	110 m hurdles	13.27	2 Q	13.26	1 Q	13.20	3 Q	13.21	5

Field events

Athlete	Event	Qualification		Final	
Athlete	Event	Distance	Position	Distance	Position
Voldemārs Lūsis	Javelin throw	79.27	17	Did not advance	
Ēriks Rags	Javelin throw	80.84	11 q	83.14	7
Vadims Vasiļevskis	Javelin throw	84.43 PB	3 Q	84.95	2nd place, silver medalist(s)

Combined events – Decathlon

Athlete	Event	100 m	LJ	SP	HJ	400 m	110H	DT	PV	JT	1500 m	Final	Rank
Jānis Karlivāns	Result	11.33	7.26	13.30	1.97	50.54	14.98	45.10	4.50	52.92	4:38.67	6363	25
Jānis Karlivāns	Points	789	876	686	776	790	852	733	760	632	689	6363	25

Women
Track & road events

Athlete	Event	Heat		Semifinal		Final	
Athlete	Event	Result	Rank	Result	Rank	Result	Rank
Anita Liepiņa	20 km walk	—				1:39:54	45
Jeļena Prokopčuka	10000 m	—				31:04.10	7
Ieva Zunda	400 m hurdles	56.21	4	Did not advance			

Field events

Athlete	Event	Qualification		Final	
Athlete	Event	Distance	Position	Distance	Position
Valentīna Gotovska	Long jump	6.41	23	Did not advance	
Ilze Gribule	Javelin throw	54.92	34	Did not advance	
Ineta Radēviča	Long jump	6.53	13	Did not advance	
Ineta Radēviča	Triple jump	14.12	20	Did not advance	
Dace Ruskule	Discus throw	57.43	28	Did not advance	

== Canoeing ==
=== Sprint ===
Athlete	Event	Heats		Semifinals		Final	
Athlete	Event	Time	Rank	Time	Rank	Time	Rank
Dagnis Vinogradovs	Men's C-1 500 m	1:50.776	2 q	1:52.511	5	Did not advance	
Dagnis Vinogradovs	Men's C-1 1000 m	3:57.070	4 q	3:53.656	3 Q	3:53.537	6

Qualification Legend: Q = Qualify to final; q = Qualify to semifinal

== Cycling ==
=== Road ===
Athlete	Event	Time	Rank
Andris Naudužs	Men's road race	Did not finish	
Romāns Vainšteins	Men's road race	5:43:03	28

== Gymnastics ==
=== Artistic ===
Men

Athlete	Event	Qualification								Final							
Athlete	Event	Apparatus						Total	Rank	Apparatus						Total	Rank
Athlete	Event	F	PH	R	V	PB	HB	Total	Rank	F	PH	R	V	PB	HB	Total	Rank
Igors Vihrovs	All-around	9.662	9.462	9.225	9.425	9.287	9.362	56.423	17 Q	9.687	8.862	9.187	9.700	9.700	9.000	9.437	18
Jevgēņijs Saproņenko	Vault	—			9.650	—		9.650	7 Q	—			9.706	—		9.706	2nd place, silver medalist(s)

== Judo ==
Athlete	Event	Round of 32	Round of 16	Quarterfinals	Semifinals	Repechage 1	Repechage 2	Repechage 3	Final / BM	
Athlete	Event	Opposition Result	Opposition Result	Opposition Result	Opposition Result	Opposition Result	Opposition Result	Opposition Result	Opposition Result	Rank
Vsevolods Zeļonijs	Men's −73 kg	Damdin (MGL); L 0011–0010	Did not advance							

== Modern pentathlon ==
Athlete	Event	Shooting (10 m air pistol)			Fencing (épée one touch)			Swimming (200 m freestyle)			Riding (show jumping)			Running (3000 m)			Total points	Final rank
Athlete	Event	Points	Rank	MP points	Results	Rank	MP points	Time	Rank	MP points	Penalties	Rank	MP points	Time	Rank	MP Points	Total points	Final rank
Deniss Čerkovskis	Men's	180	11	1096	19–13	=2	916	2:09.00	17	1252	196	23	1004	9:38.77	3	1088	5356	4
Jeļena Rubļevska	Women's	171	15	988	23–9	1	1028	2:26.96	21	1160	84	14	1116	10:58.00	4	1088	5380	2nd place, silver medalist(s)

== Sailing ==
Latvian sailors have qualified one boat for each of the following events.

Women

Athlete	Event	Race											Net points	Final rank
Athlete	Event	1	2	3	4	5	6	7	8	9	10	M*	Net points	Final rank
Vita Matīse	Mistral	22	21	20	21	20	21	~~23~~	20	10	19	19	193	20

== Shooting ==
Men

Athlete	Event	Qualification		Final	
Athlete	Event	Points	Rank	Points	Rank
Afanasijs Kuzmins	25 m rapid fire pistol	574	14	Did not advance	

== Swimming ==
Latvian swimmers earned qualifying standards in the following events (up to a maximum of 2 swimmers in each event at the A-standard time, and 1 at the B-standard time):

Men

Athlete	Event	Heat		Semifinal		Final	
Athlete	Event	Time	Rank	Time	Rank	Time	Rank
Guntars Deičmans	200 m individual medley	2:03.68	25	Did not advance			
Guntars Deičmans	400 m individual medley	4:29.17	30	—		Did not advance	
Andrejs Dūda	100 m butterfly	56.81	53	Did not advance			
Romāns Miloslavskis	100 m freestyle	50.94	35	Did not advance			
Romāns Miloslavskis	200 m freestyle	1:50.83	23	Did not advance			
Pāvels Murāns	100 m breaststroke	1:06.45	51	Did not advance			

Women

Athlete	Event	Heat		Semifinal		Final	
Athlete	Event	Time	Rank	Time	Rank	Time	Rank
Agnese Ozoliņa	100 m freestyle	59.03	43	Did not advance			

== Weightlifting ==
One Latvian weightlifter qualified for the following events:

Athlete	Event	Snatch		Clean & Jerk		Total	Rank
Athlete	Event	Result	Rank	Result	Rank	Total	Rank
Viktors Ščerbatihs	Men's +105 kg	205	3	250	2	455	2nd place, silver medalist(s)

== Wrestling ==
Latvia has qualified the following quota places.

Key:

- VT - Victory by Fall.
- PP - Decision by Points - the loser with technical points.
- PO - Decision by Points - the loser without technical points.

Men's Greco-Roman

Athlete	Event	Elimination Pool			Quarterfinal	Semifinal	Final / BM	
Athlete	Event	Opposition Result	Opposition Result	Rank	Opposition Result	Opposition Result	Opposition Result	Rank
Igors Kostins	−96 kg	Cheglakov (UZB); L 1–3 ^{PP}	Özal (TUR); L 0–3 ^{PO}	3	Did not advance			17

== See also ==
- Latvia at the 2004 Summer Paralympics
