= Canoeing at the 2012 Summer Olympics – Men's C-1 1000 metres =

Men's canoe sprint C-1 1000 metres at the Games of the XXX Olympiad
- Venue: Eton Dorney
- Date: 6 to 8 August
- Competitors: 17 from 17 nations
- Winning time: 3:47.176

Medalists
1st place, gold medalist(s)		Sebastian Brendel	Germany
2nd place, silver medalist(s)		David Cal	Spain
3rd place, bronze medalist(s)		Mark Oldershaw	Canada

The men's canoe sprint C-1 1000 metres at the 2012 Olympic Games in London took place between 6 and 8 August at Eton Dorney.

== Competition format ==
The competition comprised heats, semifinals, and a final round. The top five boats from each heat, and the fastest loser, advanced to the semifinals. The top four boats in each semifinal advanced to the "A" final, and competed for medals. A placing "B" final was held for the other semifinalists.

== Schedule ==
All times are British Summer Time (UTC+01:00)

Date	Time	Round
Monday 6 August 2012	09:54; 11:14	Heats; Semifinals
Wednesday 8 August 2012	09:48	Finals

== Results ==
=== Heats ===
First five and the best 6th placed rower are qualified for the semifinals.

==== Heat 1 ====
Rank	Canoer	Country	Time	Notes
1	Mathieu Goubel	France	3:58.122	Q
2	Attila Vajda	Hungary	3:59.853	Q
3	Ilia Shtokalov	Russia	4:04.109	Q
4	Jake Donaghey	Australia	4:21.928	Q
5	Ndiatte Gueye	Senegal	4:33.884	Q
6	Rudolph Williams	Samoa	4:54.211	

==== Heat 2 ====
Rank	Canoer	Country	Time	Notes
1	David Cal	Spain	3:54.590	Q
2	Mark Oldershaw	Canada	3:55.211	Q
3	Sebastian Brendel	Germany	3:56.469	Q
4	Everardo Cristóbal	Mexico	3:58.673	Q
5	Piotr Kuleta	Poland	4:04.889	Q
6	Fortunato Pacavira	Angola	4:39.723	q

==== Heat 3 ====
Rank	Canoer	Country	Time	Notes
1	Iosif Chirilă	Romania	4:05.863	Q
2	Vadim Menkov	Uzbekistan	4:05.895	Q
3	Aliaksandr Zhukouski	Belarus	4:06.190	Q
4	Alexandr Dyadchuk	Kazakhstan	4:44.175	Q
5	Richard Jefferies	Great Britain	4:48.511	Q

=== Semifinals ===
The fastest four canoeists in each semifinal qualify for the 'A' final. The slowest four canoeists in each semifinal qualify for the 'B' final.

==== Semifinal 1 ====
Rank	Canoer	Country	Time	Notes
1	Sebastian Brendel	Germany	3:52.122	Q
2	Attila Vajda	Hungary	3:52.365	Q
3	David Cal	Spain	3:52.767	Q
4	Vadim Menkov	Uzbekistan	3:53.257	Q
5	Piotr Kuleta	Poland	3:53.802	
6	Jake Donaghey	Australia	4:26.202	
7	Fortunato Pacavira	Angola	4:43.027	
8	Alexandr Dyadchuk	Kazakhstan	4:56.724	

==== Semifinal 2 ====
Rank	Canoer	Country	Time	Notes
1	Mathieu Goubel	France	3:51.811	Q
2	Mark Oldershaw	Canada	3:52.197	Q
3	Ilia Shtokalov	Russia	3:53.305	Q
4	Aliaksandr Zhukouski	Belarus	3:54.002	Q
5	Everardo Cristóbal	Mexico	3:54.590	
6	Iosif Chirilă	Romania	4:07.794	
7	Ndiatte Gueye	Senegal	4:37.171	
8	Richard Jefferies	Great Britain	4:49.874	

=== Finals ===
==== Final B ====
Rank	Canoer	Country	Time	Notes
1	Piotr Kuleta	Poland	3:54.414	
2	Everardo Cristóbal	Mexico	3:56.118	
3	Iosif Chirilă	Romania	3:59.730	
4	Jake Donaghey	Australia	4:22.005	
5	Ndiatte Gueye	Senegal	4:32.251	
6	Fortunato Pacavira	Angola	4:35.017	
7	Richard Jefferies	Great Britain	4:42.992	
8	Alexandr Dyadchuk	Kazakhstan	4:55.737	

==== Final A ====
Rank	Canoer	Country	Time	Notes
1st place, gold medalist(s)	Sebastian Brendel	Germany	3:47.176	
2nd place, silver medalist(s)	David Cal	Spain	3:48.053	
3rd place, bronze medalist(s)	Mark Oldershaw	Canada	3:48.502	
4	Vadim Menkov	Uzbekistan	3:49.255	
5	Mathieu Goubel	France	3:50.758	
6	Attila Vajda	Hungary	3:50.926	
7	Aliaksandr Zhukouski	Belarus	3:51.166	
8	Ilia Shtokalov	Russia	3:51.535	
