= Thomas Hall (canoeist) =

Personal information
- Born: February 21, 1982 (age 44) Montreal, Canada

Sport
- Sport: Canoeing
Medal record
Representing Canada
Men's canoe sprint
Olympic Games
Bronze medal – third place	2008 Beijing	C-1 1000 m
World Championships
Silver medal – second place	2006 Szeged	C-4 1000 m
Pan American Games
Gold medal – first place	2003 Santo Domingo	C-1 1000m
Bronze medal – third place	2003 Santo Domingo	C-2 500m

Thomas Hall (born February 21, 1982) is an Olympic sprint canoeist from Pointe Claire, Quebec, Canada. Training with the Pointe-Claire Canoe Club, he began his international career in 1999, winning a gold medal in the C-1 1000 m event at the Junior World Championships. By the time of the 2008 Summer Olympics, he had made a total of 44 top three finishes in international canoeing competitions, including 14 wins. Among these were a gold and a bronze medal at the 2003 Pan American Games. At the Beijing Olympic Games, he won a bronze medal in the Men's C-1 1000 metres event.

== Early life and biography ==
Born in Montreal, he grew up in suburban Pointe-Claire. His mother had competed in the North American kayak championships. His sister is a competitive kayaker as well, while his brother James is a musician in The Sam Roberts Band. For Thomas Steve Giles, Attila Buday Tamas Buday Jr. and Andreas Dittmer are among his role models. He also claims that J. R. R. Tolkien was a "key influence" for him growing up and he re-read The Lord of the Rings every year for a number of years. As of 2008, he was a physical education student at McGill University and, as of 2011 he was studying business at Mount Saint Vincent University in Halifax, Nova Scotia, although still living in Montreal.

== International competition ==
After joining the Pointe Claire Canoe Club, his first major international victory was the Junior World Championships in August 1999 in Zagreb, Croatia, where he placed first in the C-1 1000 m event. Earlier that month he had placed fifth in the C-1 20 km event at the Marathon Junior Cup in Hungary. Beginning in 2000 Hall began competing in an increasing amount of international tournaments. In June 2000, at the Bochum International Regatta in Bochum, Germany, he took second, third and fifth place in the junior C-2 1000 m, C-4 500 m and C-1 1000 m events respectively. In August of that year, he finished second in the junior C-1 1000 m event at the Pan American Sprint Canoe Championships in Lake Placid, New York.

Beginning with a first-place finish in the C-4 1000 m event at the World Cup in Paris, France, he acquired a total of six medals over the course of 2001, including first in the C-1 JrM 1000 m event at Canadian Sprint Canoe Championships in Lac-Beauport, Quebec. In August 2002, he had a second-place finish in the C-4 1000 m event at the same tournament in Minnedosa, Manitoba. That same year, he also took third place in the junior C-1 500 m event at the Pan American Sprint Canoe Championships in Lake Placid, and in the C-2 1000 m event at the Pan American Canoe Championships in Curitiba, Brazil. In August 2003, he came in first in the C-1 1000 m event and third in the C-1 500 m event at the Pan American Games that were held in Santo Domingo, Dominican Republic.

After a third-place finish at the Canadian Olympic Trials in Montreal, he earned seven additional top three finishes in 2004, including wins in the C-4 1000 m event at the World Cup in Račice, Czech Republic and the Junior C-1 500 m event at the Canadian Championships in Dartmouth, Nova Scotia. In 2005, he placed first in the C-1 500 m event and second in the C-1 1000 m national team selection trials in Montreal. At that year's Canadian Championships, also held in Montreal, he placed second in the C-1 1000 m event. In 2006, he placed second and third in the C-1 500 m and C-1 1000 m events respectively at the National Team Trials in Lake Lanier, Georgia. That year, at the ICF World Cup in Duisburg, Germany, he placed first in the C-1 4 × 200 m event and ended the year with a second-place finish in the C-4 1000 m event at the Senior World Championships in Szeged, Hungary.

After five international top three finishes in 2007, he acquired an additional eight top three finishes in 2008 before the 2008 Summer Olympics in Beijing. Included among these were first-place finishes in events at the Continental Olympic Qualifier and the National Team Trials in Montreal and the IFC World Cup in Duisburg and Poznań, Poland. The win in Poland solidified his winning of the 2008 overall World Cup Champion in the Canoe Discipline. He is the first Canadian to win this title. He then went on to win a bronze medal in the C-1 1000 m event at the Olympic Games in the Shunyi Olympic Rowing-Canoeing Park, finishing half a second ahead of Vadim Menkov of Uzbekistan with a time of 3:53.653, but behind Attila Vajda of Hungary and David Cal of Spain. He credited his victory to "a sea change in [...] life" beginning in January, as well as a closer bond with his coach, Michael Creamer.
