= Canoeing at the 2008 Summer Olympics – Men's K-2 1000 metres =

The men's K-2 1000 metres competition in canoeing at the 2008 Summer Olympics took place at the Shunyi Olympic Rowing-Canoeing Park in Beijing between August 18 and 22. The K-2 event is raced in two-person kayaks.

Competition consists of three rounds: the heats, the semifinals, and the final. All boats compete in the heats. The top 3 in each of the two heats advances directly to the final, while the next four finishers (places 4 through 7) in each heat move on to the semifinals. The top three finishers in each of the two semifinals join the heats winners in the final.

== Schedule ==
All times are China Standard Time (UTC+8)

Date	Time	Round
Monday, August 18, 2008	16:50-17:10	Heats
Wednesday, August 20, 2008	16:20-16:30	Semifinal
Friday, August 22, 2008	16:35-16:50	Final

== Medalists ==
Gold	Silver	Bronze
Andreas Ihle and Martin Hollstein (GER)	Kim Wraae Knudsen and René Holten Poulsen (DEN)	Andrea Facchin and Antonio Scaduto (ITA)

== Results ==
=== Heats ===
Qualification Rules: 1..3->Final, 4..7->Semifinal + 8th best time, Rest Out

==== Heat 1 ====
Rank	Athletes	Country	Time	Notes
1	Martin Hollstein, Andreas Ihle	Germany	3:15.987	QF
2	Kim Wraae Knudsen, René Holten Poulsen	Denmark	3:18.709	QF
3	Philippe Colin, Cyrille Carré	France	3:18.968	QF
4	Kevin De Bont, Bob Maesen	Belgium	3:21.604	QS
5	Shen Jie, Huang Zhipeng	China	3:26.443	QS
6	José Giovanni Ramos, Gabriel Rodríguez	Venezuela	3:31.569	QS
-	Markus Oscarsson, Anders Gustafsson	Sweden	-	Disqualified

==== Heat 2 ====
Rank	Athletes	Country	Time	Notes
1	Zoltán Kammerer, Gábor Kucsera	Hungary	3:17.636	QF
2	Adam Seroczyński, Mariusz Kujawski	Poland	3:18.282	QF
3	Andrea Facchin, Antonio Massimiliano Scaduto	Italy	3:18.897	QF
4	Mike Walker, Steven Ferguson	New Zealand	3:19.167	QS
5	Krists Straume, Kristaps Zaļupe	Latvia	3:23.198	QS
6	Mika Hokajärvi, Kalle Mikkonen	Finland	3:23.475	QS
7	Steven Jorens, Ryan Cuthbert	Canada	3:29.037	QS

Sweden's disqualification as of 2009 was not given.

=== Semifinal ===
Qualification Rules: 1..3->Final, Rest Out

Rank	Athletes	Country	Time	Notes
1	Krists Straume, Kristaps Zaļupe	Latvia	3:23.408	QF
2	Mike Walker, Steven Ferguson	New Zealand	3:23.511	QF
3	Shen Jie, Huang Zhipeng	China	3:24.031	QF
4	Kevin De Bont, Bob Maesen	Belgium	3:24.148	
5	Steven Jorens, Ryan Cuthbert	Canada	3:26.635	
6	Mika Hokajärvi, Kalle Mikkonen	Finland	3:27.018	
7	José Giovanni Ramos, Gabriel Rodríguez	Venezuela	3:27.423	

=== Final ===
Rank	Athletes	Country	Time	Notes
Gold medal	Martin Hollstein, Andreas Ihle	Germany	3:11.809	
Silver medal	Kim Wraae Knudsen, René Holten Poulsen	Denmark	3:13.580	
Bronze medal	Andrea Facchin, Antonio Massimiliano Scaduto	Italy	3:14.750	
4	Zoltán Kammerer, Gábor Kucsera	Hungary	3:15.049	
5	Mike Walker, Steven Ferguson	New Zealand	3:15.329	
6	Philippe Colin, Cyrille Carré	France	3:16.532	
7	Krists Straume, Kristaps Zaļupe	Latvia	3:19.387	
8	Shen Jie, Huang Zhipeng	China	3:22.058	
DSQ	Adam Seroczyński, Mariusz Kujawski	Poland	3:14.828	DSQ

Poland finished fourth originally, but was disqualified when Seroczyński tested positive for doping. After a year of deliberation and court cases, it was determined on 11 December 2009 that Poland was disqualified. Additionally, Seroczyński was banned from competition for two years. He is the first canoer to fail a doping test in the Summer Olympics.
