= Mikhail Tarasov =

Mikhail Tarasov may refer to:

- Svoy (Mikhail Tarasov, born 1980), American producer/writer/artist
- Mikhail Tarasov (canoeist) (born 1981), Uzbekistani sprint canoer
- Mikhail Tarasov (politician) (1899–1970), Soviet politician
