= Canoeing at the 2010 South American Games – Men's C-1 200 metres =

Event at the 2010 South American Games

The Men's C-1 200m event at the 2010 South American Games was held over March 29 at 9:20.

== Medalists ==
Gold	Silver	Bronze
Nivalter Jesus; Brazil	Ronny Ratia; Venezuela	Alvaro Sario Raguileo; Chile

== Results ==
Rank	Athlete	Time
1st place, gold medalist(s)	Nivalter Jesus (BRA)	43.180
2nd place, silver medalist(s)	Ronny Ratia (VEN)	44.430
3rd place, bronze medalist(s)	Alvaro Dario Raguileo (CHI)	45.270
4	Andres Felipe Arana (ECU)	45.940
5	Yesid Rodríguez (COL)	47.400
6	Leonardo Niveiro (ARG)	49.070
