= Uruguay at the 2004 Summer Olympics =

- IOC code: URU
- NOC: Uruguayan Olympic Committee
- Website: www.cou.org.uy (in Spanish)

in Athens
- Competitors: 15 in 6 sports
- Flag bearer: Serrana Fernández
- Medals: Gold 0 Silver 0 Bronze 0 Total 0

Summer Olympics appearances (overview)
- 1924; 1928; 1932; 1936; 1948; 1952; 1956; 1960; 1964; 1968; 1972; 1976; 1980; 1984; 1988; 1992; 1996; 2000; 2004; 2008; 2012; 2016; 2020; 2024; 2028

Uruguay competed at the 2004 Summer Olympics in Athens, Greece, from 13 to 29 August 2004. This was the nation's eighteenth appearance at the Olympics, except the 1980 Summer Olympics in Moscow, because of its full support to the United States boycott.

The Uruguayan Olympic Committee (Spanish: Comité Olímpico Uruguayo, COU) sent a total of 15 athletes to the Games, 13 men and 2 women, to compete in 6 different sports. Four athletes from the Uruguayan team had previously competed in Sydney, including track cyclist Milton Wynants, who won the bronze in the men's points race, and backstroke swimmer Serrana Fernández, who later carried the nation's flag in the opening ceremony.

Following Wynants' blistering finish in men's track cycling from Sydney four years earlier, Uruguay, however, failed to win a single Olympic medal in Athens.

== Athletics ==
Uruguayan athletes have so far achieved qualifying standards in the following athletics events (up to a maximum of 3 athletes in each event at the 'A' Standard, and 1 at the 'B' Standard).

Key

- Note–Ranks given for track events are within the athlete's heat only
- Q = Qualified for the next round
- q = Qualified for the next round as a fastest loser or, in field events, by position without achieving the qualifying target
- NR = National record
- N/A = Round not applicable for the event
- Bye = Athlete not required to compete in round

Men

Athlete	Event	Heat		Quarterfinal		Semifinal		Final	
Athlete	Event	Result	Rank	Result	Rank	Result	Rank	Result	Rank
Andrés Silva	400 m	46.48	6	—N/a		Did not advance			
Heber Viera	200 m	20.94	5	Did not advance					

Women

Athlete	Event	Heat		Semifinal		Final	
Athlete	Event	Result	Rank	Result	Rank	Result	Rank
Elena Guerra	1500 m	4:35.31	14	Did not advance			

== Canoeing ==
=== Sprint ===
Athlete	Event	Heats		Semifinals		Final	
Athlete	Event	Time	Rank	Time	Rank	Time	Rank
Darwin Correa	Men's C-1 500 m	2:02.014	7 q	1:58.727	7	Did not advance	
Darwin Correa	Men's C-1 1000 m	4:27.115	6 q	4:22.096	7	Did not advance	

Qualification Legend: Q = Qualify to final; q = Qualify to semifinal

== Cycling ==
=== Track ===
Omnium

Athlete	Event	Points	Laps	Rank
Milton Wynants	Men's points race	46	0	9
Tomás Margalef; Milton Wynants	Men's madison	3	−1	10

== Rowing ==
Uruguayan rowers qualified the following boats:

Men

Athlete	Event	Heats		Repechage		Semifinals		Final	
Athlete	Event	Time	Rank	Time	Rank	Time	Rank	Time	Rank
Leandro Salvagno Rattaro	Single sculls	7:43.91	5 R	7:02.68	3 SD/E	7:24.41	2 FD	7:01.33	20
Rodolfo Collazo; Joe Reboledo	Lightweight double sculls	6:29.20	5 R	6:30.23	3 SC/D	6:29.39	3 FC	7:03.72	18

Qualification Legend: FA=Final A (medal); FB=Final B (non-medal); FC=Final C (non-medal); FD=Final D (non-medal); FE=Final E (non-medal); FF=Final F (non-medal); SA/B=Semifinals A/B; SC/D=Semifinals C/D; SE/F=Semifinals E/F; R=Repechage

== Sailing ==
Uruguayan sailors have qualified one boat for each of the following events.

Men

Athlete	Event	Race											Net points	Final rank
Athlete	Event	1	2	3	4	5	6	7	8	9	10	M*	Net points	Final rank
Angel Segura	Mistral	30	~~33~~	31	31	29	28	31	25	31	29	29	294	32

Open

Athlete	Event	Race											Net points	Final rank
Athlete	Event	1	2	3	4	5	6	7	8	9	10	M*	Net points	Final rank
Alejandro Foglia	Laser	26	31	17	33	23	23	~~35~~	29	32	34	29	277	34

M = Medal race; OCS = On course side of the starting line; DSQ = Disqualified; DNF = Did not finish; DNS= Did not start; RDG = Redress given

== Swimming ==
Uruguayan swimmers earned qualifying standards in the following events (up to a maximum of 2 swimmers in each event at the A-standard time, and 1 at the B-standard time):

Men

Athlete	Event	Heat		Semifinal		Final	
Athlete	Event	Time	Rank	Time	Rank	Time	Rank
Martín Kutscher	200 m freestyle	1:53.91	45	Did not advance			
Martín Kutscher	400 m freestyle	4:03.21	39	—N/a		Did not advance	
Paul Kutscher	100 m freestyle	51.45	41	Did not advance			
José Mafio	50 m freestyle	23.58	50	Did not advance			

Women

Athlete	Event	Heat		Semifinal		Final	
Athlete	Event	Time	Rank	Time	Rank	Time	Rank
Serrana Fernández	100 m backstroke	1:05.51	35	Did not advance			

== See also ==
- Uruguay at the 2003 Pan American Games
- Uruguay at the 2004 Summer Paralympics
