= Jinmei =

Jinmei may refer to:

- Jinmei (人名; "personal name"), see Japanese name
- Wang Jinmei (revolutionary) (1898–1925), Chinese Communist revolutionary
- Zhang Jinmei, Chinese sprint canoer
- Jinneng Holding Equipment Manufacturing Group (晋煤; Jìnméi; "Shanxi Coal"), Chinese coal mining conglomerate based in Shanxi
