= Canoeing at the 2012 Summer Olympics – Men's C-1 200 metres =

Men's canoe sprint C-1 200m at the Games of the XXX Olympiad
- Venue: Eton Dorney
- Date: 10 to 11 August
- Competitors: 25 from 25 nations
- Winning time: 42.291

Medalists
1st place, gold medalist(s)		Yuriy Cheban	Ukraine
2nd place, silver medalist(s)		Ivan Shtyl	Russia
3rd place, bronze medalist(s)		Alfonso Benavides	Spain

The men's canoe sprint C-1 200 metres at the 2012 Olympic Games in London took place between 10 and 11 August at Eton Dorney. On 12 June 2019, the IOC stripped Jevgenij Shuklin of his silver medal. Silver and bronze medals were then reallocated in 2021.

== Competition format ==
The competition comprised heats, semifinals, and a final.

== Schedule ==
All times are British Summer Time (UTC+01:00)

Date	Time	Round
Friday 10 August 2012	09:51; 11:16	Heats; Semifinals
Saturday 11 August 2012	09:47	Finals

== Results ==
=== Heats ===
The six best placed boats in each heat qualify for the semifinals.

==== Heat 1 ====
Rank	Canoer	Country	Time	Notes
1	Mathieu Goubel	France	41.248	Q, OB
2	Andrzej Jezierski	Ireland	41.404	Q
3	Naoya Sakamoto	Japan	41.528	Q
4	Jason McCoombs	Canada	41.742	Q
5	Ronilson Oliveira	Brazil	42.216	Q
6	Sebastian Marczak	Australia	42.845	Q
7	Valentin Demyanenko	Azerbaijan	44.194	

==== Heat 2 ====
Rank	Canoer	Country	Time	Notes
1	Ivan Shtyl	Russia	41.378	Q
2	Sebastian Brendel	Germany	41.511	Q
3	Richard Jefferies	Great Britain	42.516	Q
4	Everardo Cristóbal	Mexico	44.459	Q
5	Piotr Kuleta	Poland	44.645	Q
6	Nelson Henriques	Angola	55.268	Q

==== Heat 3 ====
Rank	Canoer	Country	Time	Notes
1	Alfonso Benavides	Spain	40.993	Q, OB
2	Dzianis Harazha	Belarus	41.290	Q
3	Li Qiang	China	42.004	Q
4	Vadim Menkov	Uzbekistan	42.171	Q
5	Ľubomír Hagara	Slovakia	43.507	Q
6	Rudolph Berking-Williams	Samoa	51.483	Q

==== Heat 4 ====
Rank	Rowers	Country	Time	Notes
1	Yuriy Cheban	Ukraine	41.036	Q
DSQ	Jevgenij Shuklin	Lithuania	41.288	Q
3	Alexandr Dyadchuk	Kazakhstan	43.204	Q
4	Khaled Houcine	Tunisia	44.395	Q
5	Attila Vajda	Hungary	44.761	Q
6	Ndiatte Gueye	Senegal	51.708	Q

=== Semifinals ===
The fastest two canoeists in each semifinal qualify for the 'A' final alongside the two fastest third placed boats. The last third placed boat alongside, the fourth and fifth placed boats and the fastest sixth placed boat qualify for the 'B' final.

==== Semifinal 1 ====
Rank	Canoer	Country	Time	Notes
DSQ	Jevgenij Shuklin	Lithuania	41.483	Q
2	Mathieu Goubel	France	41.938	Q
3	Li Qiang	China	42.149	B
4	Sebastian Brendel	Germany	42.161	B
5	Ronilson Oliveira	Brazil	42.560	B
6	Vadim Menkov	Uzbekistan	42.944	b
7	Piotr Kuleta	Poland	45.348	
8	Ndiatte Gueye	Senegal	50.798	

==== Semifinal 2 ====
Rank	Canoer	Country	Time	Notes
1	Ivan Shtyl	Russia	40.346	Q, OB
2	Alfonso Benavides	Spain	40.619	Q
3	Ľubomír Hagara	Slovakia	41.472	q
4	Andrzej Jezierski	Ireland	42.012	B
5	Alexandr Dyadchuk	Kazakhstan	42.359	B
6	Sebastian Marczak	Australia	43.441	
7	Khaled Houcine	Tunisia	44.373	
8	Nelson Henriques	Angola	50.876	

==== Semifinal 3 ====
Rank	Canoer	Country	Time	Notes
1	Yuriy Cheban	Ukraine	40.647	Q
2	Dzianis Harazha	Belarus	41.427	Q
3	Naoya Sakamoto	Japan	41.771	q
4	Jason McCoombs	Canada	42.255	B
5	Attila Vajda	Hungary	42.970	B
6	Richard Jefferies	Great Britain	43.213	
7	Everardo Cristóbal	Mexico	44.571	
8	Rudolph Berking-Williams	Samoa	54.471	

=== Finals ===
==== Final B ====
Rank	Canoer	Country	Time	Notes
8	Andrzej Jezierski	Ireland	44.041	
9	Vadim Menkov	Uzbekistan	44.168	
10	Attila Vajda	Hungary	44.466	
11	Ronilson Oliveira	Brazil	44.586	
12	Jason McCoombs	Canada	44.973	
13	Alexandr Dyadchuk	Kazakhstan	45.283	
14	Li Qiang	China	45.852	
15	Sebastian Brendel	Germany	47.295	

==== Final A ====
Rank	Canoer	Country	Time	Notes
1st place, gold medalist(s)	Yuriy Cheban	Ukraine	42.291	
2nd place, silver medalist(s)	Ivan Shtyl	Russia	42.853	
3rd place, bronze medalist(s)	Alfonso Benavides	Spain	43.038	
4	Dzianis Harazha	Belarus	43.545	
5	Ľubomír Hagara	Slovakia	43.977	
6	Mathieu Goubel	France	44.045	
7	Naoya Sakamoto	Japan	44.699	
DSQ	Jevgenij Shuklin	Lithuania	42.792	
