= Richard Dalton (canoeist) =

Canadian sprint canoeist

Personal information
- Born: 27 August 1979 (age 46) County Cork, Ireland

Sport
- Sport: Canoeing
Medal record
Men's canoe sprint
World Championships
Bronze medal – third place	2002 Seville	C-2 1000 m
Bronze medal – third place	2005 Zagreb	C-1 1000 m
Bronze medal – third place	2010 Poznań	C-1 200 m
Pan American Games
Gold medal – first place	2011 Guadalajara	C-1 200 m

Richard Dalton (born 27 August 1979) is an Irish-born Canadian sprint canoeist. From 2002 to 2010, he has won three bronze medals at the ICF Canoe Sprint World Championships (C-1 200 m: 2010 - tied with Ukraine's Yuriy Cheban, C-1 1000 m: 2005, C-2 1000 m: 2002).

He also won a C-2 silver medal at the 2000 world marathon championships in Dartmouth, Nova Scotia. The distance at a marathon event varies between 36 and 40 km.

Dalton competed at the 2004 Summer Olympics in Athens, earning sixth place in both the C-1 500 m and C-1 1000 m events.
