= Shen Jie =

Shen Jie may refer to:

- Shen Jie (canoeist) (born 1986), Chinese flatwater canoer
- Shen Jie (Fengshen Yanyi), character in Chinese novel Fengshen Yanyi
