= Canoeing at the 2010 South American Games – Men's C-1 500 metres =

Event at the 2010 South American Games

The Men's C-1 500m event at the 2010 South American Games was held over March 28 at 9:20.

== Medalists ==
Gold	Silver	Bronze
Nivalter Jesus; Brazil	Andres Felipe Arana; Ecuador	Sergio Díaz; Colombia

== Results ==
Rank	Athlete	Time
1st place, gold medalist(s)	Nivalter Jesus (BRA)	1:52.23
2nd place, silver medalist(s)	Andres Felipe Arana (ECU)	1:54.66
3rd place, bronze medalist(s)	Sergio Díaz (COL)	1:55.85
4	Michael Alejandro Alegria (CHI)	1:56.71
5	Jose Rafel Silva (VEN)	1:57.31
6	Leonardo Niveiro (ARG)	2:07.65
