= 2018 ICF Canoe Sprint World Championships – Men's K-1 5000 metres =

Men's K-1 5000 metres at the 2018 ICF Canoe Sprint World Championships
- Venue: Centro de Alto Rendimento de Montemor-o-Velho
- Location: Montemor-o-Velho, Portugal
- Dates: 26 August 2018
- Competitors: 31 from 31 nations
- Winning time: 21:42.196

Medalists
gold medal	Fernando Pimenta	Portugal
silver medal	René Holten Poulsen	Denmark
bronze medal	Javier Hernanz	Spain

The men's K-1 5000 metres competition at the 2018 ICF Canoe Sprint World Championships in Montemor-o-Velho on 26 August 2018 took place at the Centro de Alto Rendimento de Montemor-o-Velho.

== Schedule ==
The schedule was as follows:

Date	Time	Round
Sunday 26 August 2018	16:50	Final

All times are Western European Summer Time (UTC+1)

== Results ==
As a long-distance event, it was held as a direct final.

Rank	Kayaker	Country	Time
1st place, gold medalist(s)	Fernando Pimenta	Portugal	21:42.196
2nd place, silver medalist(s)	René Holten Poulsen	Denmark	21:43.723
3rd place, bronze medalist(s)	Javier Hernanz	Spain	21:46.565
4	Bálint Noé	Hungary	22:07.017
5	Agustín Vernice	Argentina	22:16.203
6	Fabio Wyss	Switzerland	22:18.170
7	Artuur Peters	Belgium	22:26.151
8	Samuele Burgo	Italy	22:26.929
9	Jakub Adam	Czech Republic	22:34.472
10	Jošt Zakrajšek	Slovenia	22:36.118
11	Hamish Lovemore	South Africa	22:47.278
12	Bram Brandjes	Netherlands	22:50.761
13	Martin Nathell	Sweden	22:51.201
14	Riley Fitzsimmons	Australia	22:57.656
15	Aldis Arturs Vilde	Latvia	23:01.700
16	Ilya Podpolnyy	Israel	23:07.062
17	Quaid Thompson	New Zealand	23:22.055
18	Oleksandr Syromiatnykov	Ukraine	23:38.899
19	Zyggy Chmiel	Great Britain	23:52.018
20	Hristo Rekov	Bulgaria	23:56.173
21	Miika Nykänen	Finland	23:58.258
–	Vagner Souta	Brazil	DNF
–	Sebastián Delgado	Uruguay	DNF
–	Nikolay Chervov	Russia	DNF
–	Juan Calderon	Colombia	DNF
–	Bartosz Stabno	Poland	DSQ
–	Eivind Vold	Norway	DSQ
–	Max Hoff	Germany	DSQ
–	Aleh Yurenia	Belarus	DSQ
–	Cyrille Carré	France	DSQ
–	Marek Krajčovič	Slovakia	DSQ
