= Kalle Mikkonen =

Finnish canoeist

Kalle Mikkonen (born 18 June 1976 in Tampere) is a Finnish sprint canoer who has competed since the late 2000s. At the 2008 Summer Olympics in Beijing, he competed in the K-2 500 m and K-2 1000 m events, but was eliminated in the semifinals of both events.

Mikkonen's wife, Jenni, is a sprint canoer who won a bronze medal in the K-2 200 m event at the 2006 ICF Canoe Sprint World Championships in Szeged. Jenni also competed in two Summer Olympics for Finland.
