= Mathieu Goubel =

French canoeist (born 1980)

Personal information
- Born: 3 April 1980 (age 46)
Medal record
Men's sprint canoeing
Representing France
World Championships
Silver medal – second place	2009 Dartmouth	C-1 1000 m
Bronze medal – third place	1999 Milan	C-4 500 m
Bronze medal – third place	2009 Dartmouth	C-1 500 m
Bronze medal – third place	2009 Dartmouth	C-1 4 x 200 m
European Championships
Gold medal – first place	2008 Milan	C-1 1000 m
Gold medal – first place	2012 Zagreb	C-1 500 m
Silver medal – second place	2010 Trasona	C-1 500 m
Silver medal – second place	2010 Trasona	C-1 1000 m
Silver medal – second place	2013 Montemor-o-Velho	C-1 1000 m
Silver medal – second place	2012 Zagreb	C-1 1000 m

Mathieu Goubel (born 3 April 1980) is a French sprint canoeist who has competed since the late 1990s. He has won four medals at the ICF Canoe Sprint World Championships with a silver (C-1 1000 m: 2009 and three bronzes (C-1 500 m: 2009, C-1 4 × 200 m: 2009, C-4 500 m: 1999). He has won two gold medals and three silver medals at the European Championships.

At the 2008 Summer Olympics in Beijing, Goubel finished fourth in the C-1 500 m final and seventh in the C-1 1000 m final.

At the 2012 Summer Olympics in London, Goubel was the fastest qualifier from the semifinals but finished fifth in the C-1 1000 m final A. He finished seventh in the C-1 200 m final A.
