= Johnnathan Tafra =

Chilean canoeist (born 1983)

Personal information
- Born: 8 August 1983 (age 43)

Sport
- Sport: Canoeing
Medal record
Representing Chile
Pan American Games
Silver medal – second place	2003 Santo Domingo	C1 1000
Bronze medal – third place	2011 Guadalajara	C2 1000

Johnnathan Tafra Quitral (born August 8, 1983) is a Chilean sprint canoer who competed in the mid-2000s. He was eliminated in the semifinals of the C-1 1000 m event at the 2004 Summer Olympics in Athens.
