= Gymnastics at the 2004 Summer Olympics – Men's vault =

Olympic gymnastics event

Men's vault at the Games of the XXVIII Olympiad
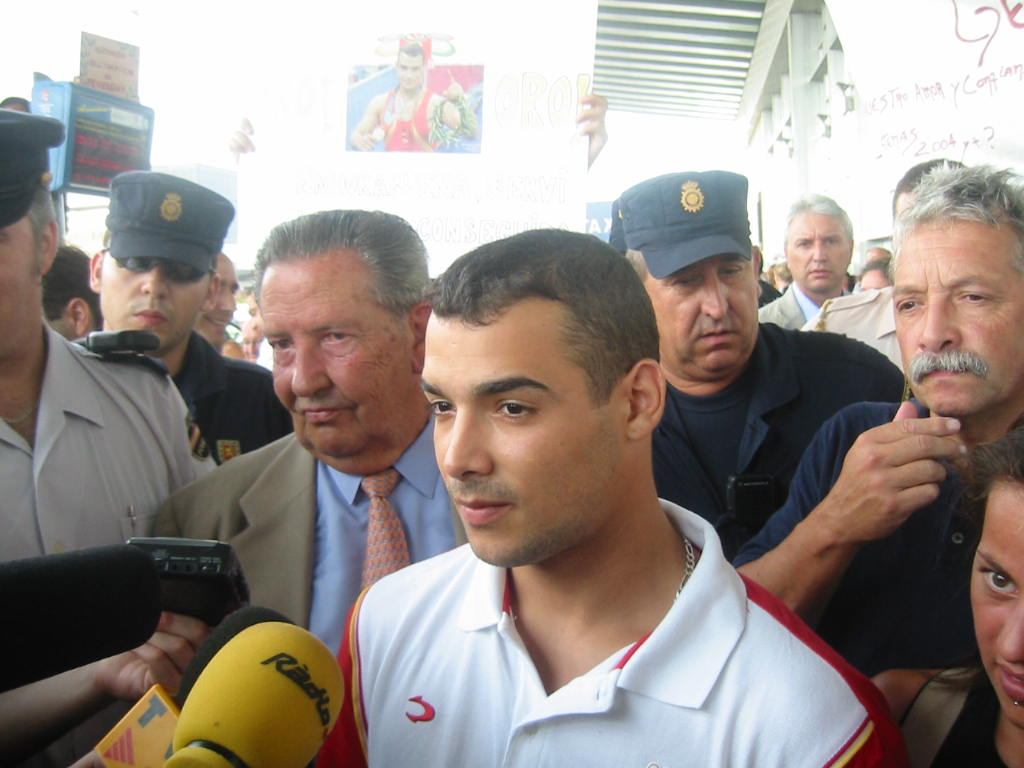
- Gervasio Deferr
- Venue: Olympic Indoor Hall
- Dates: 14 August 2004 (qualifying); 23 August 2004 (final)
- Competitors: 79 from 30 nations
- Winning score: 9.737

Medalists
1st place, gold medalist(s)		Gervasio Deferr; Spain
2nd place, silver medalist(s)		Evgeni Sapronenko; Latvia
3rd place, bronze medalist(s)		Marian Drăgulescu; Romania

The men's vault competition was one of eight events for male competitors of the artistic gymnastics discipline contested in the gymnastics at the 2004 Summer Olympics in Athens. The qualification and final rounds took place on August 14 and August 23 at the Olympic Indoor Hall. There were 79 competitors from 30 nations, with nations competing in the team event having up to 5 gymnasts and other nations having up to 2 gymnasts. The event was won by Gervasio Deferr of Spain, the third man to successfully defend an Olympic title in the vault and sixth man to win multiple medals of any color. Latvia and Romania each earned their first men's vault medals, with Evgeni Sapronenko's silver and Marian Drăgulescu's bronze, respectively.

== Background ==
This was the 21st appearance of the event, which is one of the five apparatus events held every time there were apparatus events at the Summer Olympics (no apparatus events were held in 1900, 1908, 1912, or 1920). Four of the eight finalists from 2000 returned: gold medalist Gervasio Deferr of Spain, silver medalist Alexei Bondarenko of Russia, fourth-place finisher Alexei Nemov of Russia, and sixth-place finisher Blaine Wilson of the United States. Li Xiaopeng of China had won the last two world championships in 2002 and 2003 (as well as his 1999 title), with Marian Drăgulescu of Romania the 2001 champion and 2003 runner-up. Deferr, the defending gold medalist, had had little success since his Sydney victory.

Colombia, Malaysia, and Tunisia each made their debut in the men's vault. The United States made its 19th appearance, most of any nation; the Americans had missed only the inaugural 1896 vault and the boycotted 1980 Games.

== Competition format ==
The 1996 gymnastics competition had introduced the "7–6–5" format, in which each team had 7 members, designated 6 for each apparatus, and had 5 count for team scores. In 2000, this was reduced across the board to a "6–5–4" format; the 2004 competition kept this format. Further, while in 1996 all 7 team members could compete on each apparatus for individual purposes, in 2000 and 2004 only the 5 designated for that apparatus competed. The 2000 competition had also eliminated the compulsory exercises; only voluntary exercises were done on each apparatus. The qualifying round scores were used for qualification for the team all-around, individual all-around, and apparatus finals.

The top eight gymnasts, with a limit of two per nation, advanced to the final. Non-finalists were ranked 9th through 79th based on preliminary score. The preliminary score had no effect on the final; once the eight finalists were selected, their ranking depended only on the final exercise. On vault, the final consisted of two attempts per gymnast, with the average score of the two counting.

== Schedule ==
All times are Greece Standard Time (UTC+2)

Date	Time	Round
Saturday, 14 August 2004		Qualifying
Monday, 23 August 2004		Final

== Results ==
=== Qualifying ===
Seventy-nine gymnasts competed in the vault event in the artistic gymnastics qualification round on August 14. The eight highest scoring gymnasts, with a maximum of two per nation, advanced to the final on August 23.

=== Final ===
Rank	Gymnast	Nation	#	Start Value	Switzerland	Japan	Venezuela	Italy	Portugal	Puerto Rico	Penalty	Average	Total
1st place, gold medalist(s)	Gervasio Deferr	Spain	1	9.90	~~9.65~~	9.65	~~9.75~~	9.70	9.70	9.70	—	9.687	9.737
1st place, gold medalist(s)	Gervasio Deferr	Spain	2	9.90	~~9.70~~	9.75	~~9.80~~	9.80	9.80	9.80	—	9.787	9.737
2nd place, silver medalist(s)	Evgeni Sapronenko	Latvia	1	10.00	9.70	~~9.75~~	~~9.65~~	9.70	9.75	9.70	—	9.712	9.706
2nd place, silver medalist(s)	Evgeni Sapronenko	Latvia	2	10.00	~~9.70~~	~~9.75~~	9.70	9.70	9.70	9.70	—	9.700	9.706
3rd place, bronze medalist(s)	Marian Drăgulescu	Romania	1	10.00	9.90	9.90	9.90	~~9.95~~	9.90	~~9.85~~	—	9.900	9.612
3rd place, bronze medalist(s)	Marian Drăgulescu	Romania	2	9.90	~~9.00~~	9.10	~~9.50~~	9.25	9.50	9.45	—	9.325	9.612
4	Kyle Shewfelt	Canada	1	9.90	~~9.65~~	9.70	9.70	~~9.75~~	9.65	9.70	—	9.687	9.599
4	Kyle Shewfelt	Canada	2	9.90	9.50	~~9.45~~	~~9.55~~	9.55	9.45	9.55	—	9.512	9.599
5	Filip Yanev	Bulgaria	1	9.90	~~9.65~~	9.60	9.65	9.60	~~9.55~~	9.65	—	9.625	9.581
5	Filip Yanev	Bulgaria	2	9.90	~~9.55~~	9.55	9.55	~~9.50~~	9.55	9.50	—	9.537	9.581
6	Róbert Gál	Hungary	1	9.90	9.50	~~9.65~~	~~9.40~~	9.50	9.55	9.55	—	9.525	9.537
6	Róbert Gál	Hungary	2	9.90	9.55	9.55	9.55	~~9.60~~	~~9.50~~	9.55	—	9.550	9.537
7	Li Xiaopeng	China	1	9.90	~~8.90~~	~~9.15~~	9.10	9.00	9.10	9.10	—	9.075	9.368
7	Li Xiaopeng	China	2	10.00	~~9.65~~	~~9.70~~	9.65	9.70	9.65	9.65	—	9.662	9.368
8	Alexei Bondarenko	Russia	1	10.00	~~9.00~~	9.20	~~9.35~~	9.00	9.00	9.20	—	9.100	4.550
8	Alexei Bondarenko	Russia	2	0.00	~~0.00~~	~~0.00~~	0.00	0.00	0.00	0.00	—	0.000	4.550
