= Mika Hokajärvi =

Finnish canoeist

Mika Hokajärvi (born 6 February 1987 in Tampere) is a Finnish canoe sprinter who competed in the late 2000s. At the 2008 Summer Olympics in Beijing, he was eliminated in the semifinals of both the K-2 500 m and the K-2 1000 m events. Mika's manager is Finnish Sport Management Agency, SportElite.
