= Pointe-Claire Canoe Club =

Canadian sports club

Pointe-Claire Canoe Kayak Club
- Abbreviation: CKPC
- Formation: February 15, 1989
- Legal status: active
- Location: Pointe-Claire, Quebec, Canada
- Commodore: Christine Seidl
- Head Coach: Eric Mihalovic
- Affiliations: Canoe-Kayak Québec & Canoe Kayak Canada
- Website: http://www.pccanoekayak.ca
- Formerly called: Pointe-Claire Canoe Club

The Pointe-Claire Canoe Kayak Club is a sports club on Lake Saint-Louis in Pointe-Claire, Quebec, Canada.

On February 15, 1989, the Pointe-Claire Canoe Kayak Club was established thanks to the vision, initiative and determination of its founding members, Bill Cordner, Gaétan Desmarais, Tom Dienstmann, Jean Fournel, Maurice Lamoureux and to the City of Pointe-Claire. The City provided the necessary financial support and offered the old pumping station in Valois Bay as a place to establish the first clubhouse.

The club's initial mandate was to develop sprint canoe and kayak racing programs. Later, the facility began providing services and opportunities for the citizens of Pointe-Claire to enjoy all aspects of recreational paddling.

On June 3, 1989, Mr. Malcolm Knox, Mayor of Pointe-Claire, officially inaugurated the club and was joined by hundreds of West Island residents anxious to see the facilities and learn about the sport. Thanks to the continued support of the city, a new clubhouse was built in 2002.

Over the years, the club has developed many sprint canoe and kayak athletes from novice to provincial, national, international and Olympic levels and is recognized in Quebec and Canada for its innovation, leadership and performance. The club has also become a center for the citizens of Pointe-Claire and surrounding cities to enjoy the park, the waterfront and nautical activities.

Sports include sprint canoe, sprint kayak, war canoe, standup paddleboarding, canoe polo and dragon boat. Programs offered include summer camps for children, elite training for athletes, and masters paddling (age 25 and up). The club was Quebec Provincial Champion in 2008, 2009, 2011, 2012, and 2015. Athletes associated with the club include Tom Hall, Christine Gauthier, and Tamas Buday.
