= Jake Donaghey =

Australian canoeist

Jake Donaghey (born 6 December 1994) is an Australian sprint canoeist. At the 2012 Summer Olympics, he competed in the Men's C-1 1000 metres.
