= Kevin De Bont =

Belgian sprint canoer (born 1987)

Kevin De Bont (Edegem, 18 February 1987) is a Belgian canoe sprinter who competed in the late 2000s. At the 2008 Summer Olympics in Beijing, he was eliminated in the semifinals of the K-2 1000 m event.
