= Andreas Kilingaridis =

Greek canoeist (1976–2013)

Andreas Kilingaridis (Greek: Ανδρέας Κιλιγκαρίδης) (5 August 1976 – 12 June 2013) was a Russian-born Greek sprint racer who had been competing from the early 2000s.

Kilingaridis was born in Saratov, Russia. He was eliminated in the heats of the C-1 500 m event while being disqualified in the C-1 1000 m event at the 2000 Summer Olympics in Sydney. Four years later in Athens, Kilingaridis was eliminated in the semifinals of both the C-1 500 m and the C-1 1000 m events. At the 2008 Summer Olympics in Beijing, he was eliminated in the semifinals of those same events. He died at the age of 37 while at a competition in Poland after falling into a coma brought on by leukemia.
