= Ľubomír Hagara =

Slovak sprint canoeist

Ľubomír Hagara (born 14 January 1985 in Bojnice) is a Slovak sprint canoeist. At the 2012 Summer Olympics, he competed in the Men's C-1 200 metres.
