= Jing Ying =

Chinese canoeist

Personal information
- Nationality: Chinese
- Born: 8 September 1981 (age 44) Jinan, Shandong
- Height: 1.92 m (6 ft 4 in)
- Weight: 87 kg (192 lb)

Sport
- Country: China
- Sport: Canoeing
Medal record
Men's canoe sprint
Representing China
Asian Championships
Silver medal – second place	2005 Putrajaya	C-2 500 m
Silver medal – second place	2005 Putrajaya	C-4 1000 m

(Chinese: 景影; pinyin: Jǐng Yǐng; born 8 September 1981) is a Chinese sprint canoer who competed in the mid-2000s. At the 2004 Summer Olympics in Athens, he was eliminated in the semifinals of the C-1 1000 m event. He was born in Jinan, Shandong.
