= Huang Zhipeng =

Chinese canoeist

Personal information
- Native name: 黄志鹏
- Nationality: Chinese
- Born: 27 March 1984 (age 42) Jinan, Shandong
- Height: 1.94 m (6 ft 4 in)
- Weight: 91 kg (201 lb)

Sport
- Country: China
- Sport: male sprint canoeist
- Retired: yes
Medal record
Men's sprint canoe
Representing China
Asian Championships
Gold medal – first place	2011 Tehran	K-2 500 m
Gold medal – first place	2011 Tehran	K-4 1000 m

Huang Zhipeng (Chinese: 黄志鹏; born March 27, 1984, in Jinan, Shandong) is a Chinese sprint canoer. He competed in the late 2000s. At the 2008 Summer Olympics in Beijing, he finished eighth in the K-2 1000 m event while being eliminated in the heats of the K-2 500 m event. At the 2012 Summer Olympics, he finished 10th in the men's K-4 1000 m.
