= Xu Yaping =

Chinese canoeist

Medal record

Women's canoe sprint

Representing China

Asian Championships
Gold medal – first place	2005 Putrajaya	K-2 500 m
Gold medal – first place	2005 Putrajaya	K-2 1000 m

Xu Yaping (born January 20, 1982, in Anji, Zhejiang) is a Chinese sprint canoer who competed in the late 2000s. She finished ninth in the K-4 500 m event at the 2008 Summer Olympics in Beijing.
