= Calvin Mokoto =

South African canoeist

Calvin Mokoto (born 14 October 1988) is a South African canoe sprinter who competed in the late 2000s. At the 2008 Summer Olympics in Beijing, he was eliminated in the semifinals of both the C-1 500 m and the C-1 1000 m events.
