= Torsten Lachmann =

Australian canoeist

Torsten Lachmann (born 29 April 1982 in Schwedt, East Germany) is a German-born, Australian sprint canoeist who competed in the late 2000s. At the 2008 Summer Olympics in Beijing, he was eliminated in the semifinals of both the C-1 500 m and the C-1 1000 m events.
