= Sebastian Marczak =

Australian canoeist

Sebastian Marczak (born 4 January 1983 in Sydney) is an Australian sprint canoeist. At the 2012 Summer Olympics, he competed in the Men's C-1 200 metres.
