= Emanuel Horvatiček =

Croatian canoeist

Emanuel Horvatiček (born 22 June 1979 in Osijek, Osijek-Baranja) is a Croatian sprint canoer who competed in the mid-2000s. He competed at the 2004 Summer Olympics in Athens, but eliminated in the semifinals of the C-1 500 m and the C-1 1000 m events.
