= Khaled Houcine =

Tunisian canoeist

Khaled Houcine (born 19 July 1990, Doha) is a Tunisian sprint canoeist. At the 2012 Summer Olympics, he competed in the Men's C-1 200 metres. He competed at the same event at the 2016 Summer Olympics.
