= Krists Straume =

Latvian sprint canoer (born 1986)

Personal information
- Nationality: Latvian
- Born: 13 May 1986 (age 39) Rīga, Latvian SSR, Soviet Union
- Height: 1.91 m (6 ft 3 in)
- Weight: 87 kg (192 lb)

Sport
- Country: Latvia
- Sport: Canoe racing
- Event: Kayak

Krists Straume (born 13 May 1986) is a Latvian sprint canoer who has competed since the late 2000s. At the 2008 Summer Olympics in Beijing, he competed with Kristaps Zaļupe and finished seventh in the K-2 1000 m event while being eliminated in the semifinals of the K-2 500 m event. He qualified for 2012 Summer Olympics along with countryman Aleksejs Rumjancevs, where they finished 11th in the K-2 200 m event.
