= Mike Walker (canoeist) =

New Zealand canoeist

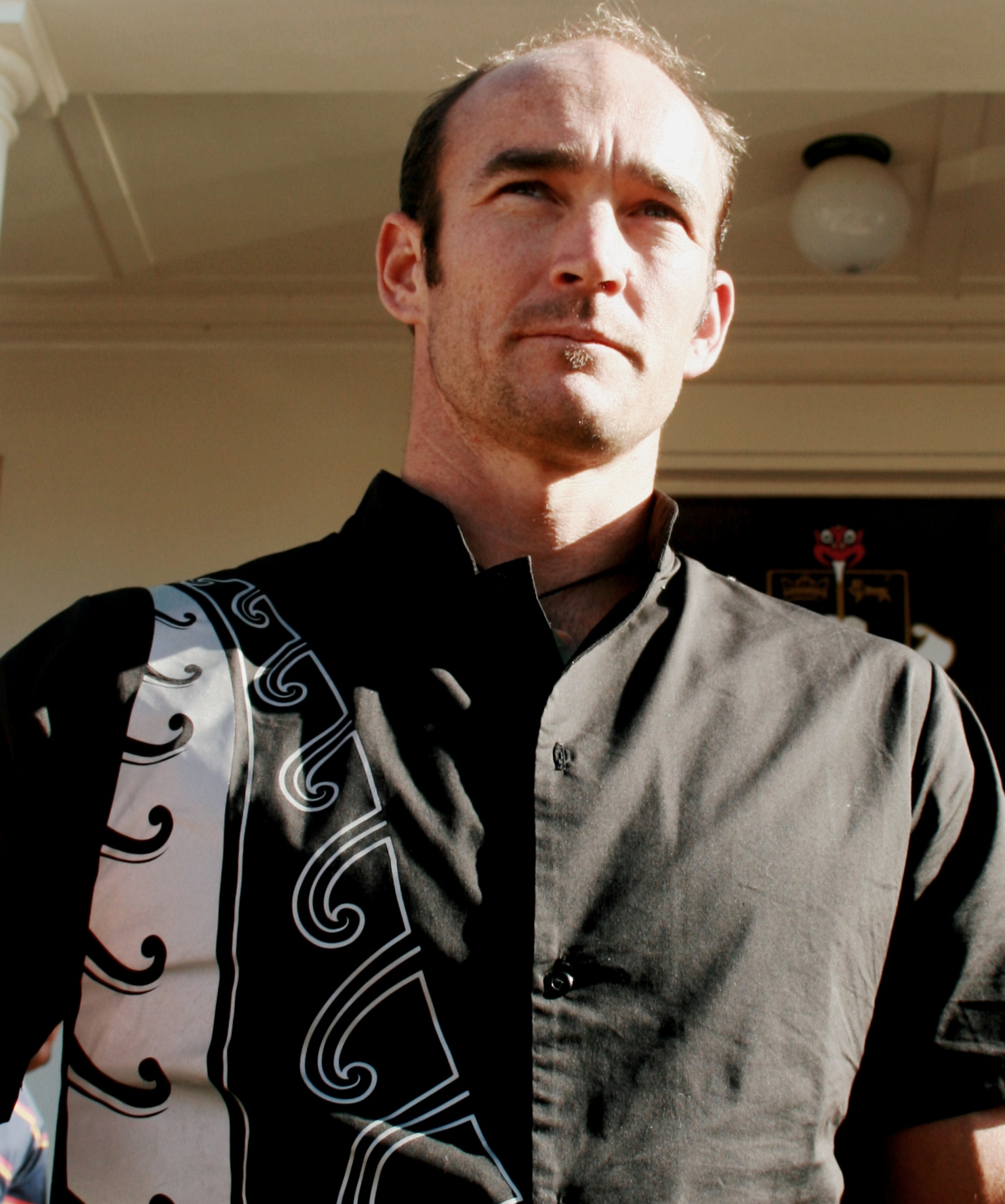

Mike Walker (born 4 April 1977) is a New Zealand sprint canoeist who competed in the late 2000s. He finished fifth in the K-2 1000 m event at the 2008 Summer Olympics in Beijing.

Walker is an old boy of Rotorua Boys' High School.
