= Andrew Willows =

Canadian sprint kayaker (born 1980)

Medal record

Men's canoe sprint

World Championships
Silver medal – second place	2006 Szeged	K-2 500 m
Bronze medal – third place	2009 Dartmouth	K-2 200 m

Andrew Willows (born October 1, 1980 in Kingston, Ontario) is a Canadian sprint kayaker who has competed since the mid first decade of the 21st century. He won two medals at the ICF Canoe Sprint World Championships with a silver (K-2 500 m: 2006) and a bronze (K-2 200 m: 2009).

Willows also competed in two Summer Olympics, earning his best finish of sixth in the K-2 500 m event at Beijing in 2008.
