= Vincent Lecrubier =

French sprint canoer (born 1986)

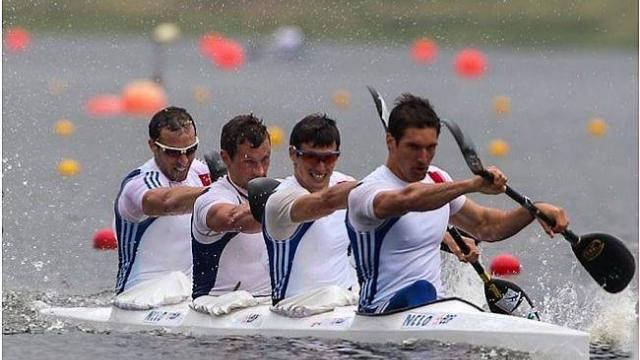
- Lecrubier (front) leading the French K-4 during the 2013 World cup

Personal information
- Full name: Vincent Lecrubier
- Nationality: French
- Born: 20 September 1986 (age 39) Rennes, France
- Height: 6 ft 1 in (185 cm)
- Weight: 190 lb (86 kg)

Sport
- Sport: Kayaking
- Event(s): K2 500m, K2 1000m, K4 1000m
- Club: CKCIR
Medal record
Men's canoe sprint
Representing France
Event	1st	2nd	3rd
Olympic Games	0	0	0
World Championships	0	3	1
World Cups	2	6	1
European Championships	0	2	0
French Championships	18	8	7
Total	20	19	9
World Championships
Silver medal – second place	2009 Dartmouth	K4 1000m
Silver medal – second place	2004 Bergen	K1 marathon U18
Silver medal – second place	2004 Bergen	K2 marathon U18
Bronze medal – third place	2003 Komatsu	K2 1000m
World Cups
Silver medal – second place	2004 Poznan U18	K1 1000m
Silver medal – second place	2004 Poznan U18	K2 500m
European Championships
Bronze medal – third place	2013 Račice	K4 1000m
Silver medal – second place	2011 Poznań	K2 500m
Silver medal – second place	2013 Račice	K2 500m
Silver medal – second place	2010 Vichy	K2 1000m
Silver medal – second place	2009 Poznań	K4 1000m
Gold medal – first place	2008 Račice	K4 1000m
Gold medal – first place	2008 Poznań	K2 1000m
Silver medal – second place	2008 Poznań	K2 500m
Silver medal – second place	2005 Poznań	K4 1000m

Vincent Lecrubier (born 20 September 1986) is a French sprint canoer who competed from 2003 to 2016.

== Sporting career ==
Lecrubier won a silver medal in the K-4 1000 m event at the 2009 ICF Canoe Sprint World Championships in Dartmouth.

Lecrubier also finished seventh in the K-2 500 m event at the 2008 Summer Olympics in Beijing.

In total, he won 2 Gold medals, 6 Silver medals, and 1 Bronze medal on Canoe World cups along his career, and won 5 Junior world medals. His French team teammates were Sébastien Jouve, Philippe Colin and Guillaume Burger. Lecrubier won 16 French champion Titles, and 42 national medals.

== Education ==
Lecrubier is an Aerospace engineer, graduating from ISAE in Toulouse, France in 2010.

Lecrubier got a PhD in Computer Science from ONERA, the French aerospace lab, in 2016.

== Professional career ==
Lecrubier worked at the French Ministry of the Armed Forces from 2010 to 2012, and at Airbus in 2011.

In 2016, Lecrubier was elected vice-president of the French Canoe Federation in 2016, and co-founded the start-up Sterblue in 2016

In 2017, Lecrubier was awarded the French under 35 Sport and Management award. Lecrubier was also awarded the ISAE-Supero Foundation Special prize in 2017.
