= Richard Jefferies (canoeist) =

British canoeist (born 1987)

Richard Jefferies (born 26 February 1987) is a British sprint canoeist. Born in Bembridge, Isle of Wight he competed in the Men's C-1 200 metres and C-1 1000 metres at the 2012 Summer Olympics.
