= Sean Pangelinan =

Guamanian sprint canoer (born 1987)

Sean Pangelinan (born March 11, 1987) is a Guamanian sprint canoer who competed in the late 2000s. At the 2008 Summer Olympics in Beijing, he was eliminated in the semifinals of the C-1 500 m event and the heats of the C-1 1000 m event.
