= Jevgēņijs Saproņenko =

Latvian Ukrainian gymnast (born 1978)

- Born: 11 November 1978 (age 47) Rīga, Latvian SSR

Gymnastics career
- Discipline: Men's artistic gymnastics
- Country represented: Latvia
Medal record
Olympic Games
Silver medal – second place	2004 Athens	Vault
World Championships
Silver medal – second place	1999 Tianjin	Vault
Silver medal – second place	2001 Ghent	Vault

Jevgēņijs Saproņenko (born 11 November 1978) is a Latvian former artistic gymnast.

His best discipline is vault where he has won silver medals in 1999 and 2001 World Championships and 2004 Summer Olympics.

He was named head of the Latvian Gymnastics Federation in October 2019.
