= Antonio Scaduto =

Italian canoeist

Personal information
- Full name: Antonio Massimiliano Scaduto
- Nationality: Italian
- Born: 1 December 1977 (age 48) Augusta, Italy

Sport
- Sport: Canoeing
- Club: Fiamme Gialle
Medal record
Olympic Games
Bronze medal – third place	2008 Beijing	K-2 1000 m
World Championships
Bronze medal – third place	2005 Zagreb	K-4 500 m
Mediterranean Games
Bronze medal – third place	2005 Almería	K-2 1000 m

Antonio Scaduto (born 1 December 1977) is an Italian canoe sprinter who has competed since the early 2000s. Competing in two Summer Olympics, he won a bronze medal in the K-2 1000 m event at Beijing in 2008.

Scaduto also won a bronze medal in the K-4 500 m event at the 2005 ICF Canoe Sprint World Championships in Zagreb.
