= Stanimir Atanasov =

Bulgarian sprint canoer

Medal record

Men's canoe sprint

Representing Bulgaria

World Championships
| Bronze medal – third place | 1995 Duisburg | C-4 500 m |

Stanimir Atanasov (Bulgarian: Станимир Атанасов) (born 20 April 1976 in Rousse) is a Bulgarian sprint canoer who has competed from 1995 to 2004. He won a bronze medal in the C-4 500 m event at the 1995 ICF Canoe Sprint World Championships in Duisburg. Atanasov was a European bronze medallist in 1997 (C-2) and 2002 (C-1).

At the 2004 Summer Olympics in Athens, he earned his best finish of eighth in the C-1 500 m event.
