= Canoeing at the 2004 Summer Olympics – Men's C-1 1000 metres =

These are the results of the men's C-1 1000 metres competition in canoeing at the 2004 Summer Olympics. The C-1 event is raced by single-man sprint canoes.

== Medalists ==
Gold	Silver	Bronze
David Cal (ESP)	Andreas Dittmer (GER)	Attila Vajda (HUN)

== Results ==
=== Heats ===
The 19 competitors first raced in three heats. The first-place finishers from each of the heats advanced directly to the final, and the remaining 16 canoers moved on to the two semifinal races. The heats were raced on August 23.

==== Heat 1 ====
Rank	Canoer	Country	Time	Notes
1	Andreas Dittmer	Germany	3:52.922	QF
2	Stanimir Atanasov	Bulgaria	3:55.590	QS
3	Marián Ostrčil	Slovakia	3:56.962	QS
4	Dagnis Vinogradovs	Latvia	3:57.070	QS
5	Jonnathan Tafra	Chile	4:04.402	QS
6	Jing Ying	China	4:05.874	QS
7	Emanuel Horvaticek	Croatia	4:27.662	QS

==== Heat 2 ====
Rank	Canoer	Country	Time	Notes
1	David Cal	Spain	3:50.091	QF
2	Stephen Giles	Canada	3:52.451	QS
3	Andreas Kiligkaridis	Greece	3:53.723	QS
4	Mitică Pricop	Romania	4:00.559	QS
5	Aliaksandr Zhukouski	Belarus	4:02.159	QS
6	Darwin Correa	Uruguay	4:27.115	QS

==== Heat 3 ====
Rank	Canoer	Country	Time	Notes
1	Konstantin Fomichev	Russia	3.48.690	QF
2	Martin Doktor	Czech Republic	3:49.029	QS
3	Karel Aguilar Chacon	Cuba	3:54.250	QS
4	Attila Vajda	Hungary	3:57.290	QS
5	Kaissar Nurmaganbetov	Kazakhstan	4:00.486	QS
6	Yuriy Cheban	Ukraine	4:00.637	QS

=== Semifinals ===
The top three finishers in each of the two semifinals advanced to the finals, joining the three canoers who had moved directly from the heats. All other canoers were eliminated. The semifinals were raced on August 25.

==== Semifinal 1 ====
Rank	Canoer	Country	Time	Notes
1.	Martin Doktor	Czech Republic	3:51.812	QF
2.	Attila Vajda	Hungary	3:52.236	QF
3.	Marián Ostrčil	Slovakia	3:53.820	QF
4.	Andreas Kiligkaridis	Greece	3:55.608	
5.	Mitică Pricop	Romania	3:59.640	
6.	Jing Ying	China	4:00.684	
7.	Darwin Correa	Uruguay	4:22.096	
8.	Jonnathan Tafra	Chile	4:22.644	

==== Semifinal 2 ====
Rank	Canoer	Country	Time	Notes
1.	Stephen Giles	Canada	3:51.720	QF
2.	Karel Aguilar Chacon	Cuba	3:52.260	QF
3.	Dagnis Vinogradovs	Latvia	3:53.656	QF
4.	Aliaksandr Zhukouski	Belarus	3:55.456	
5.	Kaissar Nurmaganbetov	Kazakhstan	3:57.804	
6.	Stanimir Atanasov	Bulgaria	4:05.664	
7.	Emanuel Horvaticek	Croatia	4:24.604	
8.	Yuriy Cheban	Ukraine	DSQ	

Cheban was disqualified for not appearing in boat control after the race.

==== Final ====
Rank	Canoer	Country	Time	Notes
1st place, gold medalist(s)	David Cal	Spain	3:46.201	
2nd place, silver medalist(s)	Andreas Dittmer	Germany	3:46.721	
3rd place, bronze medalist(s)	Attila Vajda	Hungary	3:49.025	
4.	Martin Doktor	Czech Republic	3:50.405	
5.	Stephen Giles	Canada	3:51.457	
6.	Dagnis Vinogradovs	Latvia	3:53.537	
7.	Marián Ostrčil	Slovakia	3:54.629	
8.	Karel Aguilar Chacon	Cuba	3:54.957	
9.	Konstantin Fomichev	Russia	3:55.773	

Dittmer got off to a quick lead, but Cal took the lead in an early surge to open a one-second gap at the 500 meter mark. The German tried to close the gap to the Spaniard, but Cal held on to win the gold. Also, the top four finishers of this event would win gold in this event between 1996 and 2008 (Cal - this event, Dittmer - 2000, Doktor - 1996, and Vajda - 2008).
