= Dagnis Vinogradovs =

Latvian canoeist (born 1981)

Dagnis Vinogradovs (born 2 June 1981) is a Latvian canoe sprinter who competed in the mid-2000s. At the 2004 Summer Olympics in Athens, he finished seventh in the C-1 1000 m event while being eliminated in the semifinals of the C-1 500 m event.
