= Andrea Facchin =

Italian canoeist (born 1978)

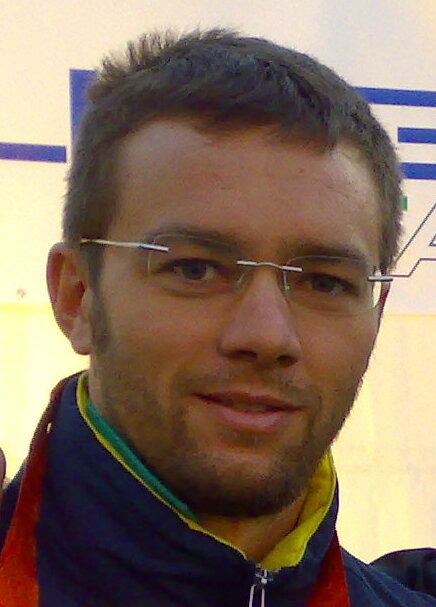
- Facchin in 2008

Medal record

Men's canoe racing

Representing Italy

Olympic Games
Bronze medal – third place	2008 Beijing	K-2 1000 m

Mediterranean Games
Bronze medal – third place	2005 Almería	K-1 500 m
Bronze medal – third place	2005 Almería	K-2 1000 m

Andrea Facchin (born 20 September 1978 in Padua) is an Italian flatwater canoer who has competed since 1999. Competing in two Summer Olympics, he won a bronze medal in the K-2 1000 m event at Beijing in 2008.

Facchin's greatest success came in 2002 when he won a bronze medal at the European Championships in the K-4 500 m event. He also won the K-1 500 m event at the 1999 Military World Games.

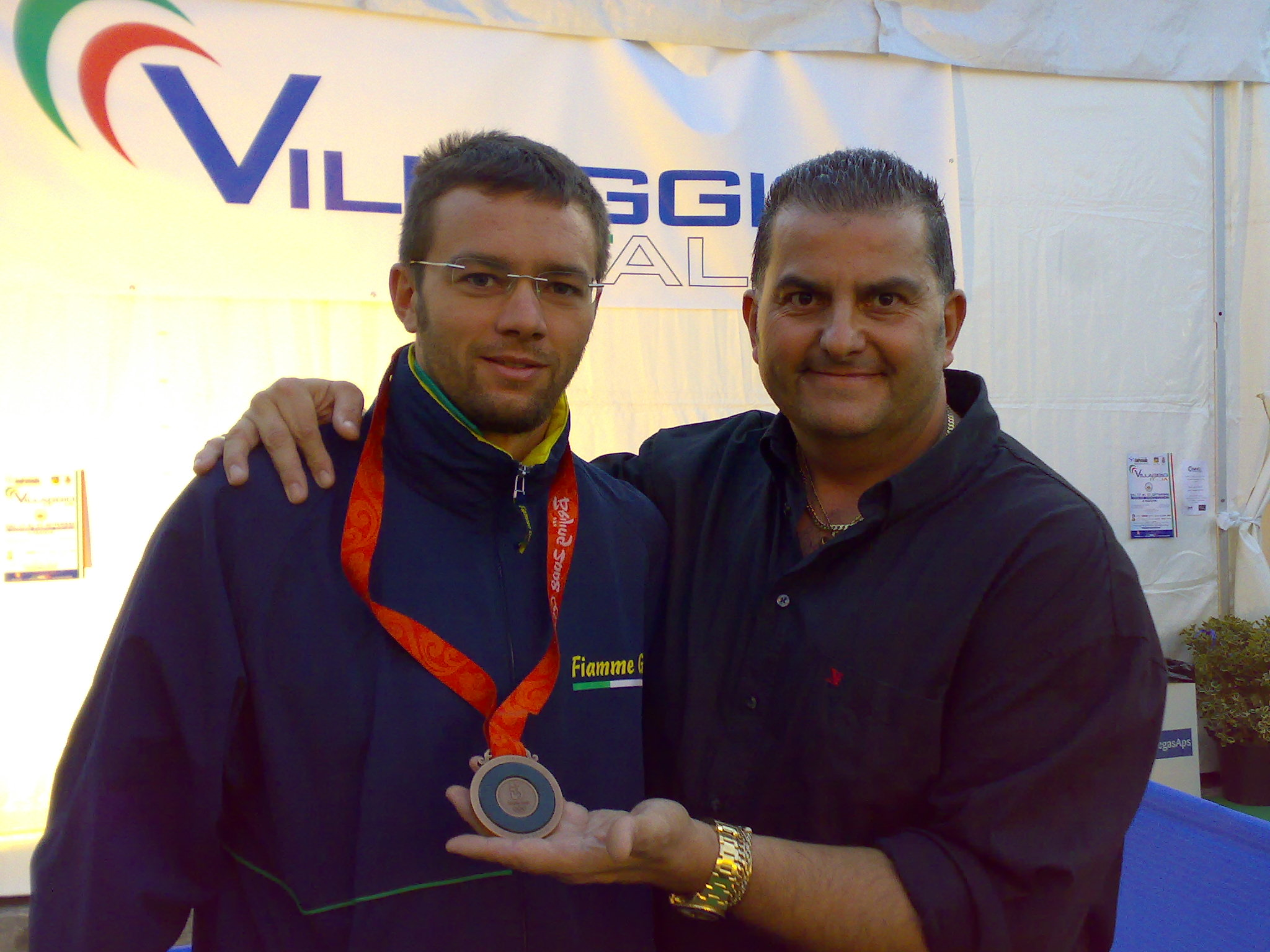
Andrea Facchin (left) with his personal trainer Paolo Tassetto (right), 2008.

For the specific weight training programme, his strength coach was Master Paolo Tassetto.
