= Ieva Tāre =

Latvian basketball player

Ieva Tāre (born March 15, 1974, in Riga) is a former Latvian women's basketball player who has represented SK Cēsis and Latvia women's national basketball team.

Tāre was trained by the current Latvian national women's team coach Ainars Zvirgzdiņš since her school years. She joined SK Cēsis, her current team, in 2008 shortly after the end of the 2008 Summer Olympics. Previously she had played for TTT/Rīga, as well as several other local and foreign clubs before 2000. In the early 1990s, Tāre turned down an offer to play in the United States due to her poor English skills.

Tāre is married to a former Latvian national rugby team player named Juris. From December 2005 to March 2007 Tāre did not play due to pregnancy and care for her newborn son, Emīls. She turned down an offer from SK Cēsis and returned to TTT/Rīga afterwards.

Tāre has played for the Latvian women's national basketball team in three EuroBasket Women championships, including the 2007 championship where she assisted the team in its way to the 4th place. In total she has represented the team in more than a hundred games. She has also represented the USSR women's U-16 national team and became the European U-16 champion. The championship was held in Portugal.

During the qualification for 2008 Summer Olympics, in the final game versus Angola, Tāre suffered a serious arm injury, later confirmed to be both a broken arm and a dislocated elbow. She was rushed off court by the medical team. Thanks to a speedy recovery programme she was able to play in the Olympics.

On April 9, 2010, Tāre announced that she retired from sport.

== Teams ==
- 1990–1993: BK Jūrmala (Latvia)
- 1993–1994: Visby Ladies (Sweden)
- 1994–1995: Fokopo Forsa (Finland)
- 1995–1996: Honka Espoo (Finland)
- 1996: RTU/Klondaika Rīga (Latvia)
- 1996–1998: Alvik Stockholm (Sweden)
- 1998–1999: La Spezia (Italy)
- 1999–2000: Universitātes Sports Rīga (Latvia)
- 2000–2008: TTT/Rīga (Latvia)
- 2008–2010: SK Cēsis (Latvia)
