= Zhang Jinmei =

Chinese canoeist

Medal record

Women's canoe sprint

Representing China

World Championships
Bronze medal – third place	2006 Szeged	K-4 1000 m

Asian Championships
Gold medal – first place	2005 Putrajaya	K-4 200 m

Zhang Jinmei is a Chinese sprint canoer who competed in the mid-2000s. She won a bronze medal in the K-4 1000 m event at the 2006 ICF Canoe Sprint World Championships in Szeged, Hungary.
