= Darwin Correa =

Uruguayan sprint canoer (born 1977)

Personal information
- Born: 23 August 1977 (age 48) Soriano Department, Uruguay

Sport
- Sport: Canoeing
Medal record
Representing Uruguay
Pan American Games
Bronze medal – third place	2003 Santo Domingo	C-1 1000 m

Darwin Mauricio Correa Kaminski (born 23 August 1977) is a Uruguayan sprint canoer who competed in the mid-2000s. He won a bronze medal in the C-1 1000 m event at the 2003 Pan American Games in Santo Domingo.

Correa also competed in the C-1 500 m and the C-1 1000 m events at the 2004 Summer Olympics in Athens, but was eliminated in the semifinals of both events.
