= Miķelis Ežmalis =

Latvian sprint canoer (born 1990)

Personal information
- National team: Latvia
- Born: 12 August 1990 (age 35)
- Height: 179 cm (5 ft 10 in)
- Weight: 78 kg (172 lb)

Sport
- Country: Latvia
- Sport: Canoeing
- Event: Singles

Miķelis Ežmalis (born 12 August 1990 in Limbaži) is a Latvian sprint canoer who competed in the late 2000s. He participated in the 2008 Summer Olympics in Beijing, and was the youngest member of the Latvian team at 17. He was eliminated in the semifinals of both the C-1 500 m and the C-1 1000 m events.
