= Mikhail Tarasov (canoeist) =

Uzbekistani canoeist (born 1981)

Medal record

Men's canoe sprint

Representing Uzbekistan

Asian Championships
Gold medal – first place	2005 Putrajaya	K-4 500 m
Gold medal – first place	2005 Putrajaya	K-4 1000 m
Bronze medal – third place	2005 Putrajaya	K-2 200 m

Mikhail Tarasov (born January 8, 1981) is an Uzbekistani sprint canoer who competed in the mid-2000s. At the 2004 Summer Olympics, he was eliminated in the heats of the K-2 1000 m event.
