= Kim Wraae Knudsen =

Danish sprint canoer (born 1977)

Olympic medal record

Men's canoe sprint
Silver medal – second place	2008 Beijing	K-2 1000 m

Kim Wraae Knudsen (born 19 September 1977) is a Danish sprint canoer who has competed since the mid-2000s. He won a silver medal in the K-2 1000 m event at the 2008 Summer Olympics in Beijing with Rene Poulsen.

Wraae represents Amager Ro- og Kajakklub. He started rowing at the age of 15, and became a part of the national team 3 years later, in 1996.

Olympic Games
Preceded by Joachim Olsen	Flagbearer for Denmark; London 2012	Succeeded by Caroline Wozniacki
