= Ryan Cuthbert =

Canadian sprint canoer

Ryan Cuthbert (born December 13, 1979, in Carleton Place, Ontario) is a Canadian sprint canoer who has competed since the mid-2000s. Competing in two Summer Olympics, he earned his best finish of ninth in the K-4 1000 m event at Athens in 2004.
