= Shen Jie (canoeist) =

Chinese male sprint canoeist (born 1986)

Personal information
- Native name: 沈洁
- Nationality: Chinese
- Born: 27 October 1986 (age 39) Liantang, Qingpu, Shanghai
- Height: 1.88 m (6 ft 2 in)
- Weight: 85 kg (187 lb)

Sport
- Country: China
- Sport: Canoe sprint
Medal record
Men's sprint canoe
Representing China
Asian Championships
Gold medal – first place	2007 Hwacheon	K-1 500 m
Gold medal – first place	2007 Hwacheon	K-1 1000 m
Gold medal – first place	2011 Tehran	K-2 500 m
Gold medal – first place	2011 Tehran	K-4 1000 m

Shen Jie (Chinese: 沈洁; born October 27, 1986, in Liantang, Qingpu district, Shanghai) is a Chinese male sprint canoeist who competed in the late 2000s. Shen competed two Olympic Games in 2008 and 2012, his personal best was that he took 8th at men's K-2 1000 m in 2008.
