= David Cal =

Spanish sprint canoeist

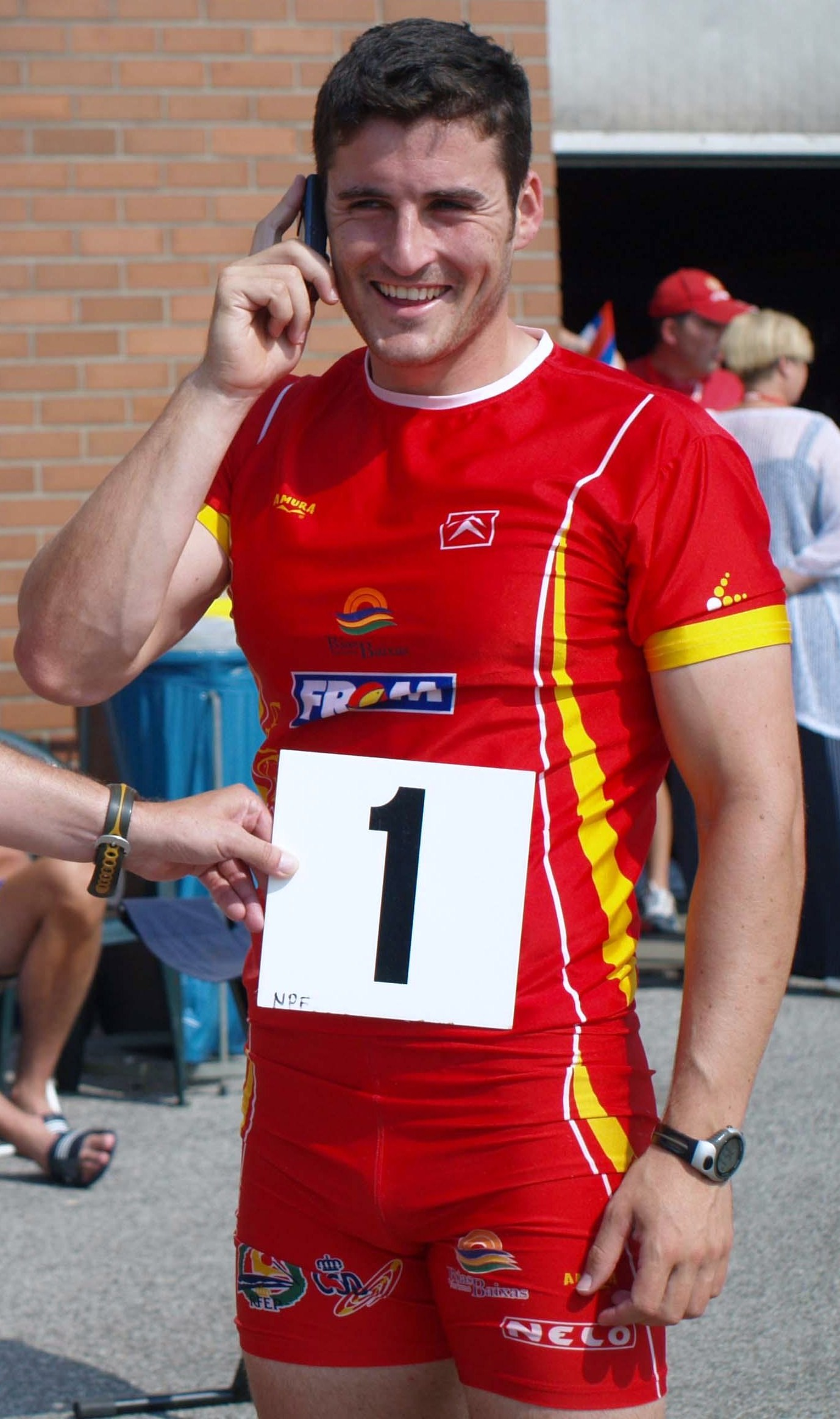

Personal information
- Full name: David Cal Figueroa
- Nationality: Spanish
- Born: 10 October 1982 (age 43) Cangas do Morrazo, Galicia, Spain
- Height: 183 cm (6 ft 0 in)
- Weight: 91 kg (201 lb)

Sport
- Country: Spain
- Sport: Canoe racing
- Event: Sprint canoe
- Club: C.M. Ría de Aldán
- Turned pro: 1999
Medal record
Men's canoe sprint
Representing Spain
Olympic Games
Gold medal – first place	2004 Athens	C-1 1000 m
Silver medal – second place	2004 Athens	C-1 500 m
Silver medal – second place	2008 Beijing	C-1 500 m
Silver medal – second place	2008 Beijing	C-1 1000 m
Silver medal – second place	2012 London	C-1 1000 m
World Championships
Gold medal – first place	2007 Duisburg	C-1 500 m
Silver medal – second place	2003 Gainesville	C-1 1000 m
Silver medal – second place	2005 Zagreb	C-1 1000 m
Silver medal – second place	2011 Szeged	C-1 1000 m
Bronze medal – third place	2007 Duisburg	C-1 1000 m

David Cal Figueroa (born 10 October 1982) is a Spanish sprint canoeist who has competed since 1999. Competing in three Summer Olympics, he has won five medals with a gold (C-1 1000 m: 2004 Summer Olympics) and four silvers (C-1 500 m: 2004, 2008; C-1 1000 m: 2008 and 2012; C-1 1000 m: 2012). With this latest medal in the London 2012 Olympic Games, he became the Spanish athlete with most Olympic medals of all time.

Cal was a junior world championship bronze medallist in Zagreb in 1999 (C-1 1000 m). The following year he became European C-1 500 m junior champion at Boulogne, France in 2000. He also won the C-1 1000 m bronze medal. He was a reserve at the Sydney Olympics. At the 2002 European under-23 championships in Zagreb, Croatia, Cal won the C-1 500 m bronze medal.

Cal has competed on the senior circuit since 2003, winning five medals at the ICF Canoe Sprint World Championships. This includes a gold (C-1 500 m: 2007), two silvers (C-1 1000 m: 2003, 2005, 2011), and a bronze (C-1 1000 m: 2007).

Cal was born in Cangas do Morrazo, Ponteverda, Galicia. He is 183 cm (6 ft 0 in) tall and weighs 91 kg (200 lbs).

== Olympic results ==
Olympic Games	Discipline	Place
(Greece) 2004 Athens	C-1 1000m	1
(Greece) 2004 Athens	C-1 500m	2
(China) 2008 Beijing	C-1 1000m	2
(China) 2008 Beijing	C-1 500m	2
(United Kingdom) 2012 London	C-1 1000m	2

== See also ==
- List of Olympic medalists in canoeing (men)

Olympic Games
Preceded by Isabel Fernández	Flagbearer for Spain; Beijing 2008	Succeeded by Pau Gasol
