= Florin Georgian Mironcic =

Romanian canoeist

Medal record

Men's canoe sprint

Representing Romania

World Championships
Silver medal – second place	2005 Zagreb	C-4 1000 m
Bronze medal – third place	2006 Szeged	C-4 500 m
Bronze medal – third place	2007 Duisburg	C-4 500 m

Florin Georgian Mironcic (born 4 May 1981 in Brăila) is an athlete from Romania sprint canoer who has competed since 2003. He won three medals at the ICF Canoe Sprint World Championships with a silver (C-4 1000 m: 2005) and two bronzes (C-4 500 m: 2006, 2007).

Mironcic also competed in two Summer Olympics, earning his best finish of sixth in the C-1 1000 m event at Beijing in 2008.

Dubbed Uriaşul Blond (Romanian for "The Blond Giant"), he is a member of the Dinamo Bucharest club. Mironcic is 1.92 m (6 ft 4 in) tall and weighs 95 kg (209 lb).
