= Nivalter Jesus =

Brazilian canoeist (born 1987)

Personal information
- Born: 17 September 1987 (age 38) Aracajú, Brazil

Sport
- Sport: Canoeing
Medal record
Representing Brazil
Pan American Games
Silver medal – second place	2011 Guadalajara	C1 200m
Bronze medal – third place	2007 Rio de Janeiro	C1 500m
South American Games
Gold medal – first place	2010 Medellin	C1 200m
Gold medal – first place	2010 Medellin	C1 500m

Nivalter Santos de Jesus (born September 17, 1987) is a Brazilian sprint canoer who competed in the late 2000s. At the 2008 Summer Olympics in Beijing, he was eliminated in the semifinals of both the C-1 500 m and the C-1 1000 m events.
