= Aldo Pruna Díaz =

Cuban canoeist (born 1983)

Personal information
- Born: 12 May 1983 (age 43) Cienfuegos, Cuba

Sport
- Sport: Canoeing
Medal record
Men's canoe sprint
Representing Cuba
Pan American Games
Silver medal – second place	2007 Rio de Janeiro	C-1 500 m
Central American and Caribbean Games
Gold medal – first place	2006 Cartagena	C-1 500 m

Aldo Pruna Díaz (born 12 May 1983) is a Cuban sprint canoer who has competed since the mid-2000s. He won a silver in the C-1 500 m event at the 2007 Pan American Games in Rio de Janeiro.

Pruno also competed in two Summer Olympics, he earned his best finish of ninth in the C-1 1000 m event at 2008 Summer Olympics.
