= Kristaps Zaļupe =

Latvian sprint canoer (born 1976)

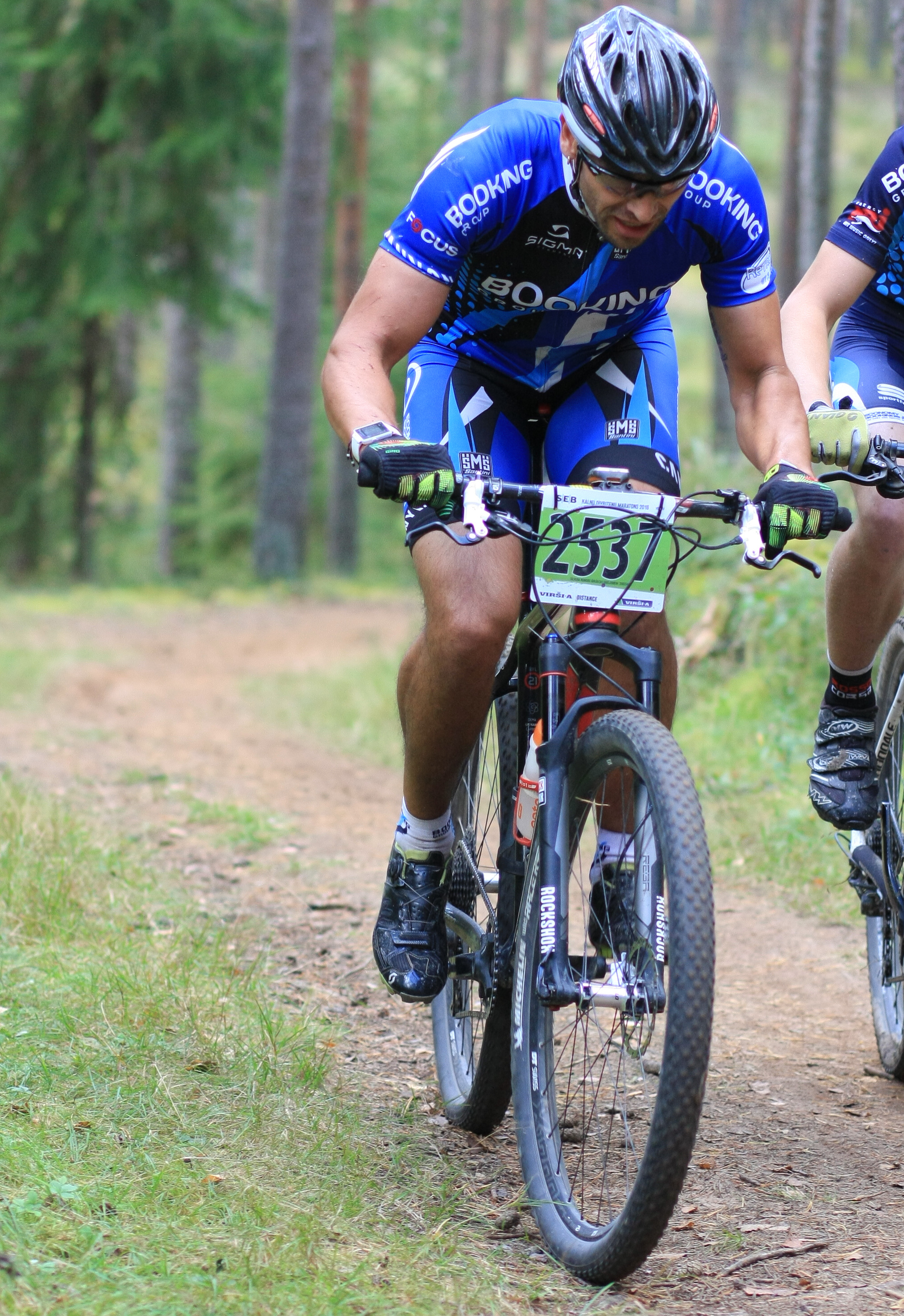
Kristaps Zaļupe during MTB race

Kristaps Zaļupe (born 12 July 1976) is a Latvian sprint canoer who competed in the late 2000s. At the 2008 Summer Olympics in Beijing, he finished seventh in the K-2 1000 m event while being eliminated in the semifinals of the K-2 500 m event.
