= Attila Vajda =

Hungarian sprint canoeist

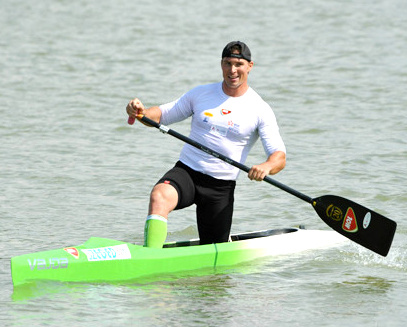
- Vajda in 2013

Personal information
- Nationality: Hungarian
- Born: 17 March 1983 (age 43) Szeged, Hungary

Sport
- Sport: Canoe sprint
- Club: EDF Démász-Szeged
- Coached by: Viktor Vécsi
Medal record
Men's sprint canoeing
Representing Hungary
Olympic Games
Gold medal – first place	2008 Beijing	C-1 1000 m
Bronze medal – third place	2004 Athens	C-1 1000 m
World Championships
Gold medal – first place	2007 Duisburg	C-1 1000 m
Gold medal – first place	2011 Szeged	C-1 1000 m
Gold medal – first place	2013 Duisburg	C-1 1000 m
Silver medal – second place	2009 Dartmouth	C-1 4 x 200 m
Silver medal – second place	2010 Poznań	C-1 1000 m
Silver medal – second place	2013 Duisburg	C-1 5000 m
Silver medal – second place	2014 Moscow	C-1 5000 m
Bronze medal – third place	2006 Szeged	C-1 1000 m
Bronze medal – third place	2014 Moscow	C-1 1000 m
European Championships
Silver medal – second place	2014 Brandenburg	C-1 1000 m

Attila Vajda (born 17 March 1983) is a Hungarian sprint canoeist who has competed since the early 2000s. Competing in three Summer Olympics (04, 08, 12) he has won two medals in the C-1 1000 m event with a gold in 2008 and a bronze in 2004.

Vajda was a European junior champion in 2000, winning the Canadian canoe C-2 1000 m title with Démász-Szeged teammate Márton Joób in Boulogne, France. In 2002 the pair came second at the European under-23 championships in Zagreb, Croatia in the same event.

Hungarian coach Zoltán Angyal was confident of Vajda's ability but took the decision not to give him his senior international debut in 2002 or 2003. In 2004, Angyal was still keeping his cards close to his chest. The Hungarian team did not take part in the early season international regattas: at the European Championships Hungary was represented in the C-1 races by Márton Joób and Sándor Malomsoki. Angyal then shocked his rival coaches by selecting Vajda as his "secret weapon" for the 2004 Summer Olympics in the C-1 1000 m event.

In his initial heat with a time of 3:57.290, Vajda qualified for the semifinals. There, he placed second, this time at 3:52.236, advancing to the final round. Vajda won a bronze in the event behind Spain's David Cal and Germany's Andreas Dittmer, but beat out 1996 Olympic champion Martin Doktor with a time of 3:49.025.

Hungary is one of the few countries in the world where sprint canoeists have the status of stars known to the general public and Vajda suddenly found himself the new "golden boy" of Hungarian canoeing. His performances in 2005 suffered as a result of these distractions; he started the season overweight and failed to make the podium in any major international race.

In 2006 he won the national title over all three distances and, in May, beat a top-class international field at Duisburg. Injury prevented him from appearing at the European championships, but he was determined not to miss the 2006 World Championships, held in his hometown of Szeged. He recovered in time to take the C-1 1000 m bronze medal behind surprise winner Everardo Cristóbal of Mexico and Germany's Andreas Dittmer. Vajda won the gold medal in the same event at the following world championships in Duisburg.

At the 2008 Summer Olympics in Beijing, Vajda wore a black armband in dedication to his fallen teammate György Kolonics and dedicated his C-1 1000 m gold in Kolonics' honor. He would win the Hungarian Sportsman of The Year for his Beijing win.

Vajda won a silver in the C-1 4 × 200 m event at the 2009 championships in Dartmouth. He also won a silver in the C-1 1000 m at the 2010 championships.

In June 2015, he competed in the inaugural European Games, for Hungary in canoe sprint, more specifically, Men's C-1 1000m. He earned a bronze medal.

== Sponsors ==
- Herbalife
- MOL
- EDF Energy
- A-HID
- Naturtex

== Awards ==
- Cross of Merit of the Republic of Hungary – Golden Cross (2004)
- Hungarian canoer of the Year (8): 2004, 2007, 2008, 2009, 2010, 2011, 2012, 2014
- Junior Príma award (2007)
- Order of Merit of the Republic of Hungary – Officer's Cross (2008)
- Hungarian Sportman of the Year (1) - votes of sports journalists: 2008
- Hungarian Athlete of the Year (1) - the National Sports Association (NSSZ) awards: 2008
- Ministerial Certificate of Merit (2012)
- Csongrád County Sportman of Year by Délmagyarország (2013)

Awards
Preceded by Gábor Talmácsi	Hungarian Sportsman of The Year; 2008	Succeeded by Dániel Gyurta
