= Marián Ostrčil =

Slovak sprint canoer (born 1980)

Medal record

Men's canoe sprint

World Championships
Silver medal – second place	2007 Duisburg	C-1 1000 m
Bronze medal – third place	2010 Poznań	C-1 5000 m

Marián Ostrčil (born 15 October 1980 in Bratislava) is a Slovak sprint canoer who has been competing since 1998.

In 1998, in Nyköping, Sweden, he became European junior champion in the individual Canadian canoe (C-1) 500m. In 2002 he won the European under-23 championship in Zagreb, Croatia in the same event.

At the ICF Canoe Sprint World Championships, Ostrčil won two medals with one silver (C-1 1000 m: 2007) and one bronze (C-1 5000 m: 2010). Competing in two Summer Olympics, he earned his best finish of seventh in the C-1 1000 m event at Athens in 2004.

Ostrčil is 190 cm (6 ft 3 in) tall and weighs 90 kg (200 lb). He is a member of the AŠK Dukla club in Trenčín where he is coached by Atlanta silver medallist Slavomír Kňazovický.
