= Aliaksandr Zhukouski =

Belarusian canoeist

Medal record

Men's canoe sprint

Representing Belarus

World Championships
Silver medal – second place	2001 Poznań	C-4 1000 m
Bronze medal – third place	2002 Seville	C-4 1000 m
Bronze medal – third place	2005 Zagreb	C-4 200 m
Bronze medal – third place	2006 Szeged	C-4 1000 m

European Championships
Bronze medal – third place	2012 Zagreb	C-1 1000 m

Aleksandr Zhukovskiy is also the name of a cinematographer who worked with director Yuri Norstein, most recently on The Overcoat.

Aliaksandr ("Sasha") Zhukouski (ZOO - COW - SKI) (born October 6, 1979) is a Belarusian sprint canoer who has competed since 2001. He won four medals at the ICF Canoe Sprint World Championships with a silver (C-4 1000 m: 2001) and three bronzes (C-4 200 m: 2005, C-4 1000 m: 2002, 2006).

Zhukouski also competed in two Summer Olympics, earning his best finish of fourth in the C-1 500 m event at Athens in 2004.
