= Canada at the 2008 Summer Olympics =

- IOC code: CAN
- NOC: Canadian Olympic Committee
- Website: www.olympic.ca (in English and French)

in Beijing
- Competitors: 332 in 25 sports
- Flag bearers: Adam van Koeverden (opening); Karen Cockburn (closing)
- Medals Ranked 19th: Gold 3 Silver 9 Bronze 8 Total 20

Summer Olympics appearances (overview)
- ~~1900~~; 1904; 1908; 1912; 1920; 1924; 1928; 1932; 1936; 1948; 1952; 1956; 1960; 1964; 1968; 1972; 1976; 1980; 1984; 1988; 1992; 1996; 2000; 2004; 2008; 2012; 2016; 2020; 2024; 2028

Other related appearances
- 1906 Intercalated Games

Canada, represented by the Canadian Olympic Committee (COC), competed at the 2008 Summer Olympics in Beijing, China, from August 8 to 24, 2008. Canadian athletes had competed in every Summer Olympic Games since 1900 with the exception of 1980, which were boycotted in protest of the Soviet invasion of Afghanistan. Canada sent 332 athletes in 25 sports, the seventh largest team at the games and Canada's largest since 1988. Canada did not send a team in handball, volleyball or basketball. Kayaker and 2004 Summer Olympics gold medalist Adam van Koeverden was the flag bearer at the opening ceremonies; Karen Cockburn bore the flag at the closing.

The COC had set a goal of finishing in the top 16 in total medals; at the 2004 Summer Olympics, Canada had finished 19th. Despite failing to win a single medal in the first week of the Games, Canada would rebound, winning a combined 18 medals in the next 9 days. This 9-day medal haul exceeded the 12 medals Canada won in Athens four years earlier. The country would wind up finishing 19th in gold medals and 14th in total medals in Beijing. Equestrian show jumper Ian Millar competed at his ninth Summer Olympics, tying the record set by Hubert Raudaschl. He had been named to ten straight Olympic teams, but did not compete at the 1980 Summer Olympics due to the Canadian boycott. For the first time, Canadian athletes were paid for medals earned. Gold medalists earned $20,000; silver medalists were paid $15,000; and bronze medalists $10,000. A total of $515,000 from the Athlete Excellence Fund was given to the medal winning athletes.

Canada was the next host country of an Olympics, with Vancouver hosting the 2010 Winter Olympics.

== Medallists ==
| Medal | Name | Sport | Event |
|---|---|---|---|
| Gold | Carol Huynh | Wrestling | Women's freestyle 48 kg |
| Gold | Andrew Byrnes; Kyle Hamilton; Malcolm Howard; Adam Kreek; Kevin Light; Brian Price (cox); Ben Rutledge; Dominic Seiterle; Jake Wetzel | Rowing | Men's eight |
| Gold | Eric Lamaze | Equestrian | Individual jumping |
| Silver | David Calder; Scott Frandsen | Rowing | Men's coxless pair |
| Silver | Karen Cockburn | Gymnastics | Women's trampoline |
| Silver | Mac Cone; Jill Henselwood; Eric Lamaze; Ian Millar | Equestrian | Team jumping |
| Silver | Simon Whitfield | Triathlon | Men's event |
| Silver | Jason Burnett | Gymnastics | Men's trampoline |
| Silver | Alexandre Despatie | Diving | Men's 3 m springboard |
| Silver | Emilie Heymans | Diving | Women's 10 m platform |
| Silver | Karine Sergerie | Taekwondo | Women's 67 kg |
| Silver | Adam van Koeverden | Canoeing | Men's K-1 500 m |
| Bronze | Tonya Verbeek | Wrestling | Women's 55 kg |
| Bronze | Ryan Cochrane | Swimming | Men's 1500 m freestyle |
| Bronze | Tracy Cameron; Melanie Kok | Rowing | Women's lightweight double sculls |
| Bronze | Iain Brambell; Liam Parsons; Jon Beare; Mike Lewis | Rowing | Men's lightweight coxless four |
| Bronze | Priscilla Lopes-Schliep | Athletics | Women's 100 m hurdles |
| Bronze | Thomas Hall | Canoeing | Men's C-1 1000 m |
| Bronze | Dylan Armstrong | Athletics | Men's shot put |
| Bronze | Christine Girard | Weightlifting | Women's 63 kg |

== Archery ==
Canada qualified its men's team by finishing eighth during the 2007 world championships. The individuals later qualified at the Canadian Olympic archery trials. It was Canada's first three-man team since the 1992 Summer Olympics. Canada also qualified an archer in the women's division after the Netherlands waived its quota for the women's archery competition.

| Athlete | Event | Ranking round | | Round of 64 | Round of 32 | Round of 16 | Quarterfinals | Semifinals | Final / BM | |
| Athlete | Event | Score | Seed | Opposition Score | Opposition Score | Opposition Score | Opposition Score | Opposition Score | Opposition Score | Rank |
|---|---|---|---|---|---|---|---|---|---|---|
| John-David Burnes | Men's individual | 644 | 50 | Ellison (USA) (15); L 89–111 | Did not advance | | | | | |
| Crispin Duenas | Men's individual | 664 | 16 | Petersson (SWE) (49); L 108 (18)–108 (19) | Did not advance | | | | | |
| Jason Lyon | Men's individual | 646 | 47 | Xue Hf (CHN) (18); W 111–106 | Ellison (USA) (15); W 107–113 | Badenov (RUS) (31); L 110–115 | Did not advance | | | |
| John-David Burnes; Crispin Duenas; Jason Lyon | Men's team | 1954 | 11 | —N/a | | Italy (6); L 217–219 | Did not advance | | | |
| Marie-Pier Beaudet | Women's individual | 628 | 34 | Banerjee (IND) (31); W 109 (5)–109 (4) | Yun O-H (KOR) (2); L 107–114 | Did not advance | | | | |

== Athletics ==
Previous world champion hurdler Perdita Felicien officially announced on July 14 that she would not compete. This followed a foot fracture sustained during a February training session. Dylan Armstrong established a new Canadian record in the shot put.

Key

- Note–Ranks given for track events are within the athlete's heat only
- Q = Qualified for the next round
- q = Qualified for the next round as a fastest loser or, in field events, by position without achieving the qualifying target
- NR = National record
- N/A = Round not applicable for the event
- Bye = Athlete not required to compete in round

Men
Track & road events

| Athlete | Event | Heat | | Quarterfinal | | Semifinal | | Final | |
| Athlete | Event | Result | Rank | Result | Rank | Result | Rank | Result | Rank |
|---|---|---|---|---|---|---|---|---|---|
| Pierre Browne | 100 m | 10.22 | 2 Q | 10.36 | 6 | Did not advance | | | |
| Anson Henry | 100 m | 10.37 | 4 q | 10.33 | 7 | Did not advance | | | |
| Bryan Barnett | 200 m | DNF | | Did not advance | | | | | |
| Jared Connaughton | 200 m | 20.60 | 3 Q | 20.45 | 5 q | 20.58 | 7 | Did not advance | |
| Tyler Christopher | 400 m | 45.67 | 5 | —N/a | | Did not advance | | | |
| Gary Reed | 800 m | 1:46.02 | 3 Q | —N/a | | 1:45.85 | 2 Q | 1:44:94 | 4 |
| Achraf Tadili | 800 m | 1:48.87 | 6 | —N/a | | Did not advance | | | |
| Nathan Brannen | 1500 m | 3:41.45 | 2 Q | —N/a | | 3:39.10 | 9 | Did not advance | |
| Taylor Milne | 1500 m | 3:41.56 | 9 | —N/a | | Did not advance | | | |
| Kevin Sullivan | 1500 m | 3:36.05 | 5 Q | —N/a | | 3:40.30 | 9 | Did not advance | |
| Kevin Sullivan | 5000 m | 14:09.16 | 11 | —N/a | | | | Did not advance | |
| Eric Gillis | 10000 m | —N/a | | | | | | 29:08.10 | 33 |
| Pierre Browne; Jared Connaughton; Anson Henry; Hank Palmer | 4 × 100 m relay | 38.77 | 2 Q | —N/a | | | | 38.66 | 6 |
| Tim Berrett | 50 km walk | —N/a | | | | | | 4:08:18 | 38 |

Field events

| Athlete | Event | Qualification | | Final | |
| Athlete | Event | Distance | Position | Distance | Position |
|---|---|---|---|---|---|
| Michael Mason | High jump | 2.25 | 19 | Did not advance | |
| Scott Russell | Javelin throw | 80.42 | 6 Q | 80.90 | 10 |
| James Steacy | Hammer throw | 76.32 | 11 Q | 75.72 | 10 |
| Dylan Armstrong | Shot put | 20.43 | 5 Q | 21.04 NR | 3rd place, bronze medalist(s) |

Combined events – Decathlon

| Athlete | Event | 100 m | LJ | SP | HJ | 400 m | 110H | DT | PV | JT | 1500 m | Final | Rank |
|---|---|---|---|---|---|---|---|---|---|---|---|---|---|
| Massimo Bertocchi | Result | 11.00 | 7.05 | 14.10 | 1.90 | 48.72 | 14.32 | 44.91 | 4.70 | 45.33 | 4:42.26 | 7714 | 18 |
| Massimo Bertocchi | Points | 861 | 826 | 734 | 714 | 875 | 934 | 765 | 819 | 520 | 666 | 7714 | 18 |

Women
Track & road events

| Athlete | Event | Heat | | Quarterfinal | | Semifinal | | Final | |
| Athlete | Event | Result | Rank | Result | Rank | Result | Rank | Result | Rank |
|---|---|---|---|---|---|---|---|---|---|
| Adrienne Power | 200 m | 23.40 | 5 q | 23.51 | 6 | Did not advance | | | |
| Carline Muir | 400 m | 51.55 | 3 Q | —N/a | | 52.37 | 7 | Did not advance | |
| Megan Metcalfe | 5000 m | 15:11.23 | 8 q | —N/a | | | | 17:06.82 | 15 |
| Priscilla Lopes-Schliep | 100 m hurdles | 12.75 | 2 Q | —N/a | | 12.68 | 3 Q | 12.64 | 3rd place, bronze medalist(s) |
| Angela Whyte | 100 m hurdles | 13.11 | 5 | —N/a | | Did not advance | | | |

Field events

| Athlete | Event | Qualification | | Final | |
| Athlete | Event | Distance | Position | Distance | Position |
|---|---|---|---|---|---|
| Ruky Abdulai | Long jump | 6.41 | 26 | Did not advance | |
| Tabia Charles | Long jump | 6.61 | 9 q | 6.47 | 10 |
| Nicole Forrester | High jump | 1.89 | 19 | Did not advance | |
| Kelsie Hendry | Pole vault | 4.30 | 18 | Did not advance | |
| Sultana Frizell | Hammer throw | 65.44 | 33 | Did not advance | |

Combined events – Heptathlon

| Athlete | Event | 100H | HJ | SP | 200 m | LJ | JT | 800 m | Final | Rank |
|---|---|---|---|---|---|---|---|---|---|---|
| Jessica Zelinka | Result | 12.97 | 1.77 | 13.79 | 23.64 | 6.12 | 43.91 | 129.34 | 6490 | 5* |
| Jessica Zelinka | Points | 1129 | 941 | 780 | 1016 | 887 | 742 | 995 | 6490 | 5* |

* The athlete who finished in second place, Lyudmila Blonska of Ukraine, tested positive for a banned substance. Both the A and the B tests were positive, therefore Blonska was stripped of her silver medal, and Zelinka moved up a position.

== Badminton ==
Canada was represented by two singles players and a mixed doubles team.

| Athlete | Event | Round of 64 | Round of 32 | Round of 16 | Quarterfinal | Semifinal | Final / BM | |
| Athlete | Event | Opposition Score | Opposition Score | Opposition Score | Opposition Score | Opposition Score | Opposition Score | Rank |
|---|---|---|---|---|---|---|---|---|
| Andrew Dabeka | Men's singles | Park S-H (KOR); L 11–21, 11–21 | Did not advance | | | | | |
| Anna Rice | Women's singles | Lee (USA); W 21–15, 19–21, 21–19 | Cicognini (SUI); W 21–10, 21–13 | Lu L (CHN); L 7–21, 12–21 | Did not advance | | | |
| Mike Beres; Valerie Loker | Mixed doubles | —N/a | | Prapakamol / Thoungthongkam (THA); L 9–21, 9–21 | Did not advance | | | |

== Baseball ==
Men's team Canada qualified its men's baseball team for the Olympics by winning the final Olympic Baseball qualification tournament with a 6–1 record. Canada went 2–5 in the tournament, but all five losses came by one run, including one in extra innings.

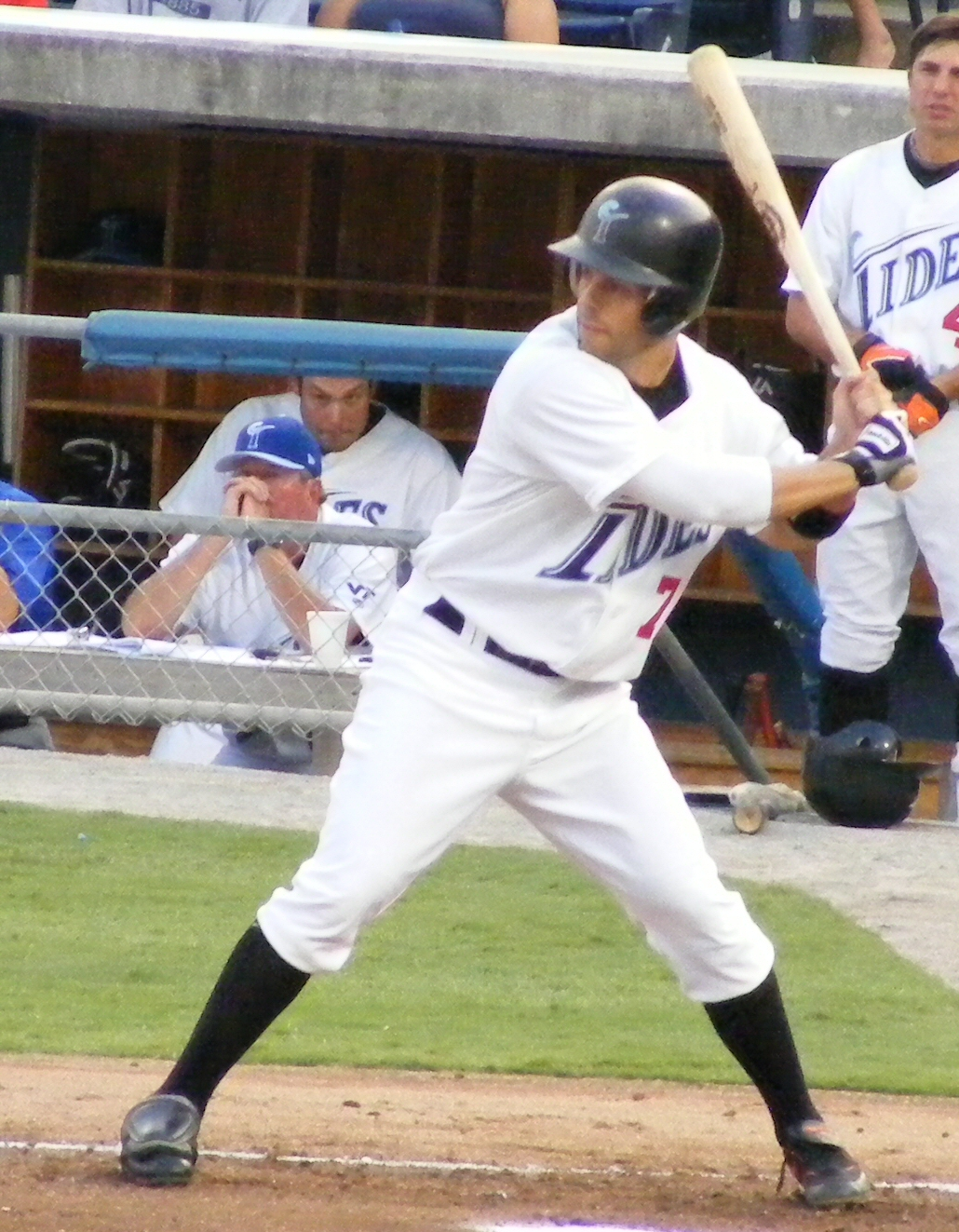
Adam Stern

- James Avery – P (replacement for Scott Richmond)
- Chris Begg – P (RH)
- T. J. Burton – P (RH)
- Stubby Clapp – 2B
- Rhéal Cormier – P (LH)
- David Corrente – C
- David Davidson – P (LH)
- Emerson Frostad – 1B/C
- Emmanuel Garcia – SS
- Steve Green – P (RH)
- Mike Johnson – P (RH)
- Brett Lawrie – C/INF/OF
- Jonathan Lockwood – P (RH)
- Brooks McNiven – P (RH)
- Ryan Radmanovich – OF
- Chris Reitsma – P (RH)
- Chris Robinson – C
- Matt Rogelstad – INF
- Michael Saunders – OF
- Adam Stern – OF
- Scott Thorman – 1B
- Jimmy Van Ostrand – 1B/OF
- Nick Weglarz – OF

| Team | W | L | RS | RA | WIN% | GB | Tiebreaker |
|---|---|---|---|---|---|---|---|
| Canada | 2 | 5 | 29 | 20 | .286 | 5 | 0–1 |

Round Robin

| Team | 1 | 2 | 3 | 4 | 5 | 6 | 7 | 8 | 9 | R | H | E |
|---|---|---|---|---|---|---|---|---|---|---|---|---|
| Canada | 0 | 0 | 0 | 3 | 2 | 0 | 1 | 4 | - | 10 | 10 | 0 |
| China | 0 | 0 | 0 | 0 | 0 | 0 | 0 | 0 | - | 0 | 8 | 2 |
WP: Chris Begg (1–0) LP: Tao Bu (0–1); Home runs: CAN: Scott Thorman (1), Michael Saunders (1); CHN: None

| Team | 1 | 2 | 3 | 4 | 5 | 6 | 7 | 8 | 9 | R | H | E |
|---|---|---|---|---|---|---|---|---|---|---|---|---|
| Canada | 0 | 0 | 2 | 1 | 0 | 2 | 0 | 1 | 0 | 6 | 9 | 2 |
| Cuba | 0 | 3 | 0 | 0 | 0 | 4 | 0 | 0 | X | 7 | 5 | 2 |
WP: Vicyohandri Odelín (1–0) LP: Jonathan Lockwood (0–1) Sv: Norberto González (1); Home runs: CAN: Michael Saunders (2), Nick Weglarz 2 (2); CUB: Alexander Malleta (1), Alfredo Despaigne (1)

| Team | 1 | 2 | 3 | 4 | 5 | 6 | 7 | 8 | 9 | R | H | E |
|---|---|---|---|---|---|---|---|---|---|---|---|---|
| South Korea | 0 | 0 | 1 | 0 | 0 | 0 | 0 | 0 | 0 | 1 | 3 | 0 |
| Canada | 0 | 0 | 0 | 0 | 0 | 0 | 0 | 0 | 0 | 0 | 5 | 1 |
WP: Hyun-Jin Ryu (1–0) LP: Mike Johnson (0–1); Home runs: KOR: Keun-Woo Jeong (1); CAN: None

| Team | 1 | 2 | 3 | 4 | 5 | 6 | 7 | 8 | 9 | R | H | E |
|---|---|---|---|---|---|---|---|---|---|---|---|---|
| Canada | 0 | 1 | 2 | 1 | 0 | 0 | 0 | 0 | 0 | 4 | 10 | 1 |
| United States | 0 | 0 | 0 | 2 | 1 | 0 | 2 | 0 | X | 5 | 9 | 1 |
WP: Brian Duensing (1–0) LP: Chris Reitsma (0–1); Home runs: CAN: None; USA: Brian Barden (1)

| Team | 1 | 2 | 3 | 4 | 5 | 6 | 7 | 8 | 9 | R | H | E |
|---|---|---|---|---|---|---|---|---|---|---|---|---|
| Japan | 0 | 0 | 0 | 0 | 1 | 0 | 0 | 0 | 0 | 1 | 5 | 0 |
| Canada | 0 | 0 | 0 | 0 | 0 | 0 | 0 | 0 | 0 | 0 | 2 | 2 |
WP: Yoshihisa Naruse (1–0) LP: Chris Begg (0–1) Sv: Koji Uehara (1); Home runs: JPN: Atsunori Inaba (1); CAN: None

| Team | 1 | 2 | 3 | 4 | 5 | 6 | 7 | 8 | 9 | R | H | E |
|---|---|---|---|---|---|---|---|---|---|---|---|---|
| Canada | 0 | 0 | 1 | 2 | 0 | 0 | 0 | 1 | 0 | 4 | 7 | 1 |
| Netherlands | 0 | 0 | 0 | 0 | 0 | 0 | 0 | 0 | 0 | 0 | 2 | 0 |
WP: Brooks McNiven (1–0) LP: Shairon Martis (0–2)

| Team | 1 | 2 | 3 | 4 | 5 | 6 | 7 | 8 | 9 | 10 | 11 | 12 | R | H | E |
|---|---|---|---|---|---|---|---|---|---|---|---|---|---|---|---|
| Chinese Taipei | 1 | 4 | 0 | 0 | 0 | 0 | 0 | 0 | 0 | 0 | 0 | 1 | 6 | 10 | 2 |
| Canada | 2 | 1 | 0 | 1 | 0 | 0 | 1 | 0 | 0 | 0 | 0 | 0 | 5 | 10 | 3 |
WP: Fu-Te Ni (1–2) LP: Chris Reitsma (0–2) Sv: Chih-Chia Chang (1); Home runs: TPE: Che-Hsuan Lin (1), Chih-Sheng Lin (1); CAN: Stubby Clapp (1)

== Boxing ==
Twelve years after qualifying boxers in 11 of 12 events in 1996, Canada only sent one boxer to Beijing. Adam Trupish qualified for the Olympics by reaching the quarterfinal at the 2007 AIBA World championships.

| Athlete | Event | Round of 32 | Round of 16 | Quarterfinals | Semifinals | Final | |
| Athlete | Event | Opposition Result | Opposition Result | Opposition Result | Opposition Result | Opposition Result | Rank |
|---|---|---|---|---|---|---|---|
| Adam Trupish | Welterweight | Sarsekbayev (KAZ); L 1–20 | Did not advance | | | | |

== Canoeing ==
=== Slalom ===
Canada had a three-person slalom team in Beijing.

| Athlete | Event | Preliminary | | | | | | Semifinal | | Final | | | |
| Athlete | Event | Run 1 | Rank | Run 2 | Rank | Total | Rank | Time | Rank | Time | Rank | Total | Rank |
|---|---|---|---|---|---|---|---|---|---|---|---|---|---|
| James Cartwright | Men's C-1 | 93.83 | 12 | 90.80 | 13 | 184.63 | 13 | Did not advance | | | | | |
| David Ford | Men's K-1 | 85.35 | 6 | 89.49 | 17 | 174.84 | 13 Q | 88.46 | 6 Q | 89.89 | 5 | 178.35 | 6 |
| Sarah Boudens | Women's K-1 | 158.99 | 18 | 109.68 | 15 | 268.67 | 19 | Did not advance | | | | | |

=== Sprint ===
For the first time ever, Canada had participants in all twelve sprint races.

Men

| Athlete | Event | Heats | | Semifinals | | Final | |
| Athlete | Event | Time | Rank | Time | Rank | Time | Rank |
|---|---|---|---|---|---|---|---|
| Thomas Hall | C-1 1000 m | 4:05.198 | 4 QS | 3:58.820 | 1 Q | 3:53.653 | 3rd place, bronze medalist(s) |
| Mark Oldershaw | C-1 500 m | 1:48.817 | 2 QS | 1:52.649 | 4 | Did not advance | |
| Adam van Koeverden | K-1 500 m | 1:35.557 | 1 QS | 1:42.438 | 1 Q | 1:37.630 | 2nd place, silver medalist(s) |
| Adam van Koeverden | K-1 1000 m | 3:29.622 | 1 QF | Bye | | 3:31.793 | 8 |
| Gabriel Beauchesne-Sévigny; Andrew Russell | C-2 500 m | 1:43.189 | 5 QS | 1:42.921 | 3 Q | 1:42.450 | 5 |
| Gabriel Beauchesne-Sévigny; Andrew Russell | C-2 1000 m | 3:43.491 | 3 QF | Bye | | 3:41.165 | 6 |
| Ryan Cuthbert; Steve Jorens | K-2 1000 m | 3:29.037 | 7 QS | 3:26.635 | 5 | Did not advance | |
| Richard Dober Jr. Andrew Willows | K-2 500 m | 1:30.324 | 4 QS | 1:31.232 | 1 Q | 1:30.857 | 6 |
| Rhys Hill; Angus Mortimer; Christopher Pellini; Brady Reardon | K-4 1000 m | 3:06.811 | 5 QS | 3:02.572 | 3 Q | 3:01.630 | 9 |

Women

| Athlete | Event | Heats | | Semifinals | | Final | |
| Athlete | Event | Time | Rank | Time | Rank | Time | Rank |
|---|---|---|---|---|---|---|---|
| Karen Furneaux | K-1 500 m | 1:54.065 | 7 QS | 1:55.145 | 7 | Did not advance | |
| Mylanie Barre; Kristin Gauthier | K-2 500 m | 1:46.129 | 4 QS | 1:47.510 | 9 | Did not advance | |
| Genevieve Beauchesne-Sevigny; Émilie Fournel; Karen Furneaux; Kristin Gauthier | K-4 500 m | 1:39.366 | 5 QS | 1:38.224 | 4 | Did not advance | |

Qualification Legend: QS = Qualify to semi-final; QF = Qualify directly to final

== Cycling ==
=== Road ===
Canada qualified three athletes for the men's road race and the right to send a cyclist to the time trial event. To be eligible to compete in the men's time trial, an athlete must have also competed in the road race or in a track, mountain bike or BMX event.

Men

| Athlete | Event | Time | Rank |
|---|---|---|---|
| Michael Barry | Road race | 6:24:05 | 9 |
| Ryder Hesjedal | Road race | 6:34:26 | 56 |
| Ryder Hesjedal | Time trial | 1:05:42 | 16 |
| Svein Tuft | Road race | 6:34:26 | 59 |
| Svein Tuft | Time trial | 1:04:39 | 7 |

Women

| Athlete | Event | Time | Rank |
|---|---|---|---|
| Leigh Hobson | Road race | 3:32:52 | 17 |
| Erinne Willock | Road race | 3:33:23 | 37 |
| Alex Wrubleski | Road race | 3:39:36 | 50 |
| Alex Wrubleski | Time trial | 39:15.42 | 24 |

=== Track ===
| Athlete | Event | Points | Laps | Rank |
|---|---|---|---|---|
| Zachary Bell | Men's points race | 27 | 1 | 7 |
| Gina Grain | Women's points race | 6 | 0 | 9 |
| Zachary Bell; Martin Gilbert | Men's madison | 5 | –3 | 12 |

=== Mountain biking ===
Canada qualified its riders via the UCI ranking by nations.

| Athlete | Event | Time | Rank |
|---|---|---|---|
| Geoff Kabush | Men's cross-country | 2:03:55 | 20 |
| Seamus McGrath | Men's cross-country | LAP (3 laps) | 44 |
| Catharine Pendrel | Women's cross-country | 1:46:37 | 4 |
| Marie-Hélène Prémont | Women's cross-country | Did not finish | |

=== BMX ===
Canada qualified a female entry for the event, which was contested at the Olympics for the first time, via the UCI Nations ranking and a male entry via the 2008 UCI BMX World Championships.

| Athlete | Event | Seeding | | Quarterfinals | | Semifinals | | Final | |
| Athlete | Event | Result | Rank | Points | Rank | Points | Rank | Result | Rank |
|---|---|---|---|---|---|---|---|---|---|
| Scott Erwood | Men's BMX | 37.050 | 26 | 19 | 8 | Did not advance | | | |
| Samantha Cools | Women's BMX | 39.137 | 13 | —N/a | | 14 | 4 Q | DNF | 7 |

== Diving ==
Ten Canadian athletes qualified for the Olympics, and competed in six of the eight diving events. Spots were allocated at the Olympic Trials, held in Victoria, B.C., June 20 to June 22.

Men

| Athlete | Events | Preliminaries | | Semifinals | | Final | |
| Athlete | Events | Points | Rank | Points | Rank | Points | Rank |
|---|---|---|---|---|---|---|---|
| Alexandre Despatie | 3 m springboard | 453.60 | 9 Q | 518.75 | 2 Q | 536.65 | 2nd place, silver medalist(s) |
| Reuben Ross | 3 m springboard | 446.15 | 13 Q | 395.85 | 18 | Did not advance | |
| Riley McCormick | 10 m platform | 425.95 | 14 Q | 391.35 | 16 | Did not advance | |
| Reuben Ross | 10 m platform | 425.60 | 15 Q | 390.75 | 17 | Did not advance | |
| Alexandre Despatie; Arturo Miranda | 3 m synchronized springboard | —N/a | | | | 409.29 | 5 |

Women

| Athlete | Events | Preliminaries | | Semifinals | | Final | |
| Athlete | Events | Points | Rank | Points | Rank | Points | Rank |
|---|---|---|---|---|---|---|---|
| Jennifer Abel | 3 m springboard | 300.75 | 10 Q | 296.10 | 13 | Did not advance | |
| Blythe Hartley | 3 m springboard | 350.60 | 3 Q | 324.60 | 10 Q | 374.60 | 4 |
| Émilie Heymans | 10 m platform | 403.85 | 3 Q | 374.10 | 4 Q | 437.05 | 2nd place, silver medalist(s) |
| Marie-Ève Marleau | 10 m platform | 296.50 | 17 Q | 335.25 | 7 Q | 332.10 | 7 |
| Meaghan Benfeito; Roseline Filion | 10 m synchronized platform | —N/a | | | | 305.91 | 7 |

== Equestrian ==
=== Dressage ===
| Athlete | Horse | Event | Grand Prix | | Grand Prix Special | | Grand Prix Freestyle | | Overall | |
| Athlete | Horse | Event | Score | Rank | Score | Rank | Score | Rank | Score | Rank |
|---|---|---|---|---|---|---|---|---|---|---|
| Jacqueline Brooks | Gran Gesto | Individual | 63.750 | 29 | Did not advance | | | | | |
| Ashley Holzer | Pop Art | Individual | 67.042 | 19 Q | 68.760 | 15 Q | 71.450 | 12 | 70.105 | 14 |
| Leslie Reid | Orion | Individual | 59.750 | 44 | Did not advance | | | | | |
| Jacqueline Brooks; Ashley Holzer; Leslie Reid | See above | Team | 63.514 | 10 | —N/a | | | | 63.514 | 9 |

=== Eventing ===
| Athlete | Horse | Event | Dressage | | Cross-country | | | Jumping | | | | | | Total | |
| Athlete | Horse | Event | Dressage | | Cross-country | | | Qualifier | | | Final | | | Total | |
| Athlete | Horse | Event | Penalties | Rank | Penalties | Total | Rank | Penalties | Total | Rank | Penalties | Total | Rank | Penalties | Rank |
|---|---|---|---|---|---|---|---|---|---|---|---|---|---|---|---|
| Kyle Carter | Madison Park | Individual | 63.50 # | 61 | 18.40 | 81.90 | 32 | 14.00 | 95.90 | 36 | Did not advance | | | 95.90 | 35 |
| Sandra Donnelly | Buenos Aires | Individual | 60.20 # | 58 | 24.00 | 84.20 | 34 | 8.00 | 92.20 | 31 | Did not advance | | | 92.20 | 30 |
| Selena O'Hanlon | Colombo | Individual | 44.10 | 20 | 76.80 | 120.90 | 51 | 12.00 | 132.90 | 46 | Did not advance | | | 132.90 | 45 |
| Samantha Taylor | Livewire | Individual | 70.70 | 66 | 69.60 | 180.30 | 60 | 8.00 | 188.30 | 56 | Did not advance | | | 188.30 | 55 |
| Michael Winter | King Pin | Individual | 48.90 | 28 | 76.80 | 125.70 | 53 | 20.00 | 145.70 | 52 | Did not advance | | | 145.70 | 51 |
| Kyle Carter; Sandra Donnelly; Selena O'Hanlon; Samantha Taylor; Michael Winter | See above | Team | 153.20 | 9 | 133.80 | 287.00 | 9 | 34.00 | 321.00 | 9 | —N/a | | | 321.00 | 9 |

# – Indicates that points do not count in team total

=== Show jumping ===
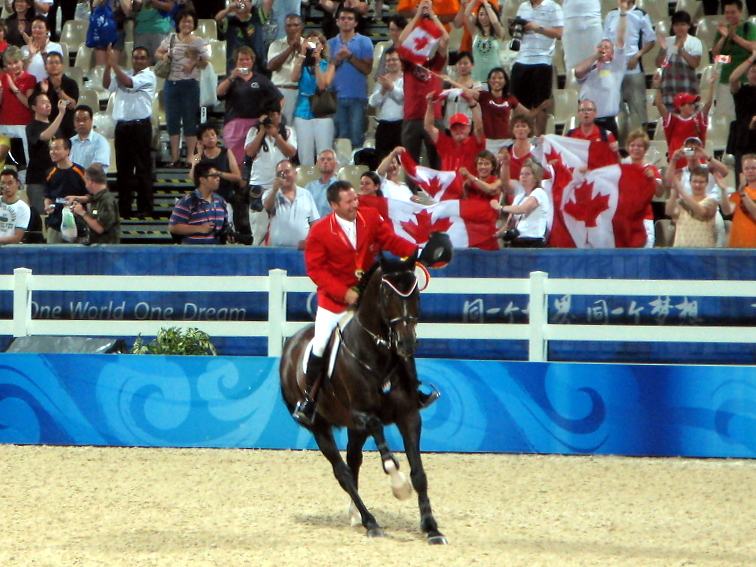
Gold-medal winners Eric Lamaze and Hickstead at the 2008 Olympics

| Athlete | Horse | Event | Qualification | | | | | | | | Final | | | | | Total | |
| Athlete | Horse | Event | Round 1 | | Round 2 | | | Round 3 | | | Round A | | Round B | | | Total | |
| Athlete | Horse | Event | Penalties | Rank | Penalties | Total | Rank | Penalties | Total | Rank | Penalties | Rank | Penalties | Total | Rank | Penalties | Rank |
|---|---|---|---|---|---|---|---|---|---|---|---|---|---|---|---|---|---|
| Mac Cone | Ole | Individual | 0 | =1 | 12 | 12 | =30 | Withdrew | | | | | | | | | |
| Jill Henselwood | Special Ed | Individual | 1 | =14 | 18 | 19 | =44 Q | 0 | 19 | 26 Q | 4 | =11 | Did not finish | | | | |
| Eric Lamaze | Hickstead | Individual | 0 | =1 | 0 | 0 | =1 Q | 4 | 4 | =2 Q | 0 | =1 Q | 0 | 0 | =1 | 0 | 1st place, gold medalist(s) |
| Ian Millar | In Style | Individual | 4 | =30 | 4 | 8 | =16 Q | 0 | 8 | =8 Q | 8 | =23 | Did not advance | | | 8 | =23 |
| Mac Cone; Jill Henselwood; Eric Lamaze; Ian Millar | See above | Team | —N/a | | | | | | | | 16 | =4 Q | 4 | 20 | =1 JO | 24 | 2nd place, silver medalist(s) |

== Fencing ==
Canada qualified all of its current quota places via the world ranking (Pan-Am zone). Philippe Beaudry qualified for the Sabre individual event at the last chance continental qualifier held in Querétaro, Mexico.

Men

| Athlete | Event | Round of 64 | Round of 32 | Round of 16 | Quarterfinal | Semifinal | Final / BM | |
| Athlete | Event | Opposition Score | Opposition Score | Opposition Score | Opposition Score | Opposition Score | Opposition Score | Rank |
|---|---|---|---|---|---|---|---|---|
| Igor Tikhomirov | Individual épée | Bye | Khvorost (UKR); W 15–11 | Jeannet (FRA); L 7–15 | Did not advance | | | |
| Josh McGuire | Individual foil | —N/a | Or (ISR); W 11–10 | Sanzo (ITA); L 3–15 | Did not advance | | | |
| Philippe Beaudry | Individual sabre | Fathy (EGY); W 15–8 | Montano (ITA); L 4–15 | Did not advance | | | | |

Women

| Athlete | Event | Round of 64 | Round of 32 | Round of 16 | Quarterfinal | Semifinal | Final / BM | |
| Athlete | Event | Opposition Score | Opposition Score | Opposition Score | Opposition Score | Opposition Score | Opposition Score | Rank |
|---|---|---|---|---|---|---|---|---|
| Sherraine Schalm | Individual épée | —N/a | Bye | Mincza-Nébald (HUN); L 13–15 | Did not advance | | | |
| Jujie Luan | Individual foil | Boubakri (TUN); W 13–9 | Mohamed (HUN); L 7–15 | Did not advance | | | | |
| Julie Cloutier | Individual sabre | Bujdoso (GER); L 2–15 | Did not advance | | | | | |
| Olga Ovtchinnikova | Individual sabre | Bye | Lee S-M (KOR); W 15–13 | Besbes (TUN); L 12–15 | Did not advance | | | |
| Sandra Sassine | Individual sabre | Wood (RSA); W 15–2 | Zagunis (USA); L 10–15 | Did not advance | | | | |
| Julie Cloutier; Olga Ovtchinnikova; Wendy Saschenbrecker; Sandra Sassine | Team sabre | —N/a | | | France; L 22–45 | Classification semi-final Poland; L 44–45 | 7th place final South Africa; W 45–16 | 7 |

== Field hockey ==
Canada's men's team qualified for Beijing by defeating Argentina 2–2 (5–4 on penalties) in the final of the 2007 Pan-American games.

=== Men's tournament ===
Roster

The following is the Canadian roster in the men's field hockey tournament of the 2008 Summer Olympics.

Head Coach: Louis Mendonca

2. Mike Mahood (GK)
3. Anthony Wright
4. Scott Tupper
6. Marian Schole
9. Ken Pereira
10. Wayne Fernandes
11. Peter Short
13. Rob Short (c)
16. Scott Sandison
17. Connor Grimes
18. Paul Wettlaufer
19. Mark Pearson
20. Ranjeev Deol
21. Ravinder Kahlon
23. Bindi Kullar
24. Gabbar Singh

Reserve:

8. Philip Wright
30. David Carter (GK)

Group play

| Pos | Team | Pld | W | D | L | GF | GA | GD | Pts | Qualification |
|---|---|---|---|---|---|---|---|---|---|---|
| 1 | Netherlands | 5 | 4 | 1 | 0 | 16 | 6 | +10 | 13 | Semi-finals |
| 2 | Australia | 5 | 3 | 2 | 0 | 24 | 7 | +17 | 11 | Semi-finals |
| 3 | Great Britain | 5 | 2 | 2 | 1 | 10 | 7 | +3 | 8 | Fifth place game |
| 4 | Pakistan | 5 | 2 | 0 | 3 | 11 | 13 | −2 | 6 | Seventh place game |
| 5 | Canada | 5 | 1 | 1 | 3 | 10 | 17 | −7 | 4 | Ninth place game |
| 6 | South Africa | 5 | 0 | 0 | 5 | 4 | 25 | −21 | 0 | Eleventh place game |

11 August 2008
18:30

| Australia | 6–1 | Canada |
|---|---|---|
| Abbott 15', 16', 54'; Kavanagh 22'; Ockenden 48'; Schubert 57' | Report | P. Short 38' |

Umpires:
Christian Blasch (GER)
Chen Dekang (CHN)

13 August 2008
18:00

| Canada | 1–3 | Pakistan |
|---|---|---|
| Kullar 35' | Report | Imran 39'; Rasool 39'; Waqas 57' |

Umpires:
Kim Hong-lae (KOR)
David Leiper (GBR)

15 August 2008
10:30

| Netherlands | 4–2 | Canada |
|---|---|---|
| Taekema 4', 8', 33'; Weusthof 49' | Report | Deol 12'; Kahlon 64' |

Umpires:
Murray Grime (AUS)
Chen Dekang (CHN)

17 August 2008
08:30

| Great Britain | 1–1 | Canada |
|---|---|---|
| Daly 67' | Report | Pereira 47' |

Umpires:
Roel van Eert (NED)
Gary Simmonds (RSA)

19 August 2008
18:00

| Canada | 5–3 | South Africa |
|---|---|---|
| R. Short 15'; Fernandes 31', 46'; Grimes 38', 70' | Report | Smith 4', 51'; Tsolekile 28' |

Umpires:
Roel van Eert (NED)
Satinder Kumar (IND)

Classification match for 9th/10th place

21 August 2008
08:30

| Belgium | 3–0 | Canada |
|---|---|---|
| Dekeyser 2', 70'; Dohmen 23' | Report |

Umpires:
David Leiper (GBR)
Xavier Adell (ESP)

== Football ==
Canada's national women's team qualified by finishing in the top two at the CONCACAF Olympic qualifying tournament.

=== Women's tournament ===
Roster

Head coach: (Norway) Even Pellerud

Canada named a squad of 18 players and 4 alternates for the tournament. Prior to the tournament, Amber Allen withdrew injured and was replaced on 3 August 2008 by Jodi-Ann Robinson, who was initially selected as an alternate player. Chelsea Stewart subsequently filled the vacant alternate spot.

| No. | Pos. | Player | Date of birth (age) | Caps | Goals | Club |
|---|---|---|---|---|---|---|
| 1 | GK | Karina LeBlanc | 30 March 1980 (aged 28) | 62 | 0 | (United States Soccer Federation) New Jersey Wildcats |
| 2 | FW | Jodi-Ann Robinson | 17 April 1989 (aged 19) | 27 | 4 | (Canadian Soccer Association) Vancouver Whitecaps |
| 3 | DF | Emily Zurrer | 12 July 1987 (aged 21) | 8 | 0 | (Canadian Soccer Association) Vancouver Whitecaps |
| 4 | MF | Clare Rustad | 27 April 1983 (aged 25) | 39 | 1 | (United States Soccer Federation) University of Washington |
| 5 | DF | Robyn Gayle | 31 October 1985 (aged 22) | 23 | 0 | (Canadian Soccer Association) Ottawa Fury |
| 6 | MF | Sophie Schmidt | 28 June 1988 (aged 20) | 38 | 3 | (Canadian Soccer Association) Vancouver Whitecaps |
| 7 | MF | Rhian Wilkinson | 12 May 1982 (aged 26) | 62 | 7 | (Canadian Soccer Association) Ottawa Fury |
| 8 | MF | Diana Matheson | 6 April 1984 (aged 24) | 81 | 4 | (Canadian Soccer Association) Ottawa Fury |
| 9 | DF | Candace Chapman | 2 April 1983 (aged 25) | 57 | 4 | (Canadian Soccer Association) Vancouver Whitecaps |
| 10 | DF | Martina Franko | 13 January 1976 (aged 32) | 46 | 5 | (Canadian Soccer Association) Vancouver Whitecaps |
| 11 | DF | Randee Hermus | 14 November 1979 (aged 28) | 110 | 11 | (Canadian Soccer Association) Vancouver Whitecaps |
| 12 | FW | Christine Sinclair (captain) | 12 June 1983 (aged 25) | 120 | 92 | (Canadian Soccer Association) Vancouver Whitecaps |
| 13 | MF | Amy Walsh | 13 September 1977 (aged 30) | 94 | 5 | (Canadian Soccer Association) Laval Comets |
| 14 | FW | Melissa Tancredi | 27 December 1981 (aged 26) | 33 | 6 | (United States Soccer Federation) Atlanta Silverbacks |
| 15 | FW | Kara Lang | 22 October 1986 (aged 21) | 80 | 31 | (United States Soccer Federation) UCLA |
| 16 | FW | Jonelle Filigno | 24 September 1990 (aged 17) | 15 | 1 | (United States Soccer Federation) Rutgers University |
| 17 | MF | Brittany Timko | 5 September 1985 (aged 22) | 86 | 2 | (Canadian Soccer Association) Vancouver Whitecaps |
| 18 | GK | Erin McLeod | 26 February 1983 (aged 25) | 35 | 0 | (Canadian Soccer Association) Vancouver Whitecaps |

Group play

| Pos | Team | Pld | W | D | L | GF | GA | GD | Pts | Qualification |
|---|---|---|---|---|---|---|---|---|---|---|
| 1 | China | 3 | 2 | 1 | 0 | 5 | 2 | +3 | 7 | Qualified for the quarterfinals |
| 2 | Sweden | 3 | 2 | 0 | 1 | 4 | 3 | +1 | 6 | Qualified for the quarterfinals |
| 3 | Canada | 3 | 1 | 1 | 1 | 4 | 4 | 0 | 4 | Qualified for the quarterfinals |
| 4 | Argentina | 3 | 0 | 0 | 3 | 1 | 5 | −4 | 0 | |

6 August 2008
17:00

| Argentina | 1–2 | Canada |
|---|---|---|
| Manicler 85' | Report | Chapman 27'; Lang 72' |

Tianjin Olympic Center Stadium, Tianjin
Attendance: 23,201
Referee: Christine Beck (Germany)
9 August 2008
19:45

| Canada | 1–1 | China |
|---|---|---|
| Sinclair 34' | Report | Xu Yuan 36' |

Tianjin Olympic Center Stadium, Tianjin
Attendance: 52,600
Referee: Dagmar Damková (Czech Republic)
12 August 2008
19:45

| Sweden | 2–1 | Canada |
|---|---|---|
| Schelin 19', 51' | Report | Tancredi 63' |

Beijing Workers' Stadium, Beijing
Attendance: 51,112
Referee: Pannipar Kamnueng (Thailand)

Quarterfinal

15 August 2008
18:00

| United States | 2–1 (a.e.t.) | Canada |
|---|---|---|
| Hucles 12'; Kai 101' | Report | Sinclair 30' |

Shanghai Stadium, Shanghai
Attendance: 26,129
Referee: Jenny Palmqvist (Sweden)

== Gymnastics ==
=== Artistic ===
Canada has qualified a six-man team and two women for Beijing.

Men

No Canadian man made an apparatus final, with Kyle Shewfelt finishing ninth on vault and eleventh on floor exercise in the qualifying round. The Canadian team similarly failed to advance to the final, finishing ninth and missing out by less than four-tenths of a point. Two Canadian men, Adam Wong and Nathan Gafuik, did advance to the all-around final. Ken Ikeda and Jared Walls were the reserves for the men's team.

Team

| Athlete | Event | Qualification | | | | | | | | Final | | | | | | | |
| Athlete | Event | Apparatus | | | | | | Total | Rank | Apparatus | | | | | | Total | Rank |
| Athlete | Event | F | PH | R | V | PB | HB | Total | Rank | F | PH | R | V | PB | HB | Total | Rank |
|---|---|---|---|---|---|---|---|---|---|---|---|---|---|---|---|---|---|
| Nathan Gafuik | Team | 15.225 | 13.800 | 14.250 | 16.175 | 15.450 | 14.825 | 89.725 | 20 Q | Did not advance | | | | | | | |
| Grant Golding | Team | 14.850 | 15.125 | 15.275 | —N/a | 15.450 | —N/a | | | Did not advance | | | | | | | |
| David Kikuchi | Team | —N/a | 14.175 | 15.200 | 15.575 | 15.150 | 14.200 | —N/a | | Did not advance | | | | | | | |
| Brandon O'Neill | Team | 3.450 | 12.475 | —N/a | 15.150 | 14.900 | —N/a | | | Did not advance | | | | | | | |
| Kyle Shewfelt | Team | 15.525 | —N/a | 13.925 | 16.350 | —N/a | 14.250 | —N/a | | Did not advance | | | | | | | |
| Adam Wong | Team | 14.900 | 14.375 | 14.500 | 15.650 | 15.125 | 14.575 | 89.125 | 24 Q | Did not advance | | | | | | | |
| Total | Team | 60.500 | 56.475 | 59.225 | 63.750 | 61.175 | 57.850 | 358.975 | 9 | Did not advance | | | | | | | |

Individual finals

| Athlete | Event | Apparatus | | | | | | Total | Rank |
| Athlete | Event | F | PH | R | V | PB | HB | Total | Rank |
|---|---|---|---|---|---|---|---|---|---|
| Nathan Gafuik | All-around | 15.325 | 13.475 | 14.375 | 16.175 | 15.275 | 15.000 | 89.625 | 17 |
| Adam Wong | All-around | 14.325 | 14.550 | 15.050 | 15.700 | 15.350 | 14.825 | 89.800 | 15 |

Women

Finishing in fourteenth place at the 2007 World Gymnastics Championships (Only the top 12 teams qualified), Canada failed to qualify a full women's team to the Olympics.

| Athlete | Event | Qualification | | | | | | Final | | | | | |
| Athlete | Event | Apparatus | | | | Total | Rank | Apparatus | | | | Total | Rank |
| Athlete | Event | F | V | UB | BB | Total | Rank | F | V | UB | BB | Total | Rank |
|---|---|---|---|---|---|---|---|---|---|---|---|---|---|
| Nansy Damianova | All-around | 14.100 | 14.700 | 13.650 | 14.250 | 56.700 | 38 | Did not advance | | | | | |
| Elyse Hopfner-Hibbs | All-around | 13.875 | 14.675 | 14.975 | 15.125 | 58.650 | 19 Q | 14.925 | 14.875 | 15.425 | 14.150 | 58.375 | 16 |

=== Rhythmic ===
If Brazil had withdrawn from the group all-around competition, they would have been replaced by Canada.

| Athlete | Event | Qualification | | | | | | Final | | | | | |
| Athlete | Event | Rope | Hoop | Clubs | Ribbon | Total | Rank | Rope | Hoop | Clubs | Ribbon | Total | Rank |
|---|---|---|---|---|---|---|---|---|---|---|---|---|---|
| Alexandra Orlando | Individual | 15.675 | 16.550 | 16.175 | 15.225 | 63.625 | 18 | Did not advance | | | | | |

=== Trampoline ===
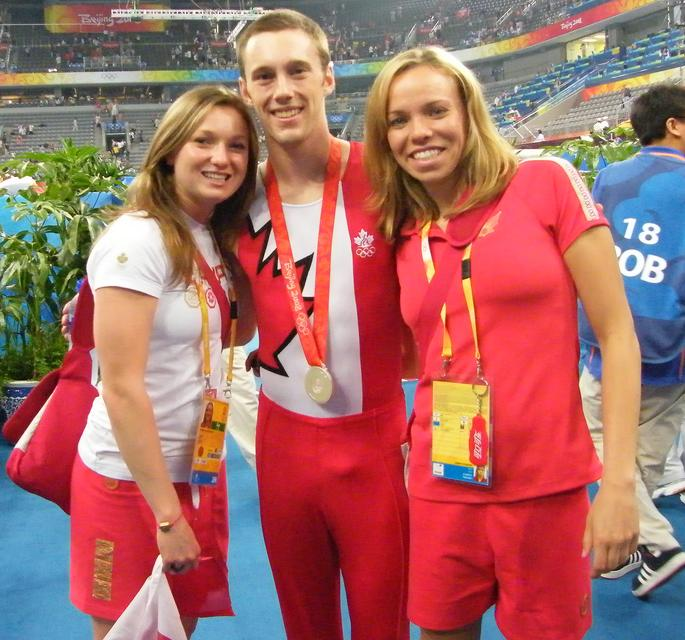
The Canadian Trampoline team: Rosannagh MacLennan, silver medalist Jason Burnett and silver medalist Karen Cockburn

Three trampolinists competed for Canada in Beijing.

| Athlete | Event | Qualification | | Final | |
| Athlete | Event | Score | Rank | Score | Rank |
|---|---|---|---|---|---|
| Jason Burnett | Men's | 69.70 | 7 Q | 40.70 | 2nd place, silver medalist(s) |
| Karen Cockburn | Women's | 66.00 | 3 Q | 37.00 | 2nd place, silver medalist(s) |
| Rosannagh MacLennan | Women's | 65.60 | 4 Q | 35.50 | 7 |

== Judo ==
Four men and one woman will represent Canada in Judo.

Men

| Athlete | Event | Preliminary | Round of 32 | Round of 16 | Quarterfinals | Semifinals | Repechage 1 | Repechage 2 | Repechage 3 | Final / BM | |
| Athlete | Event | Opposition Result | Opposition Result | Opposition Result | Opposition Result | Opposition Result | Opposition Result | Opposition Result | Opposition Result | Opposition Result | Rank |
|---|---|---|---|---|---|---|---|---|---|---|---|
| Frazer Will | −60 kg | Bye | Houkes (NED); L 0001–0011 | Did not advance | | | Alexanidis (GRE); W 1001–0010 | Guédez (VEN); W 1000–0000 | Sobirov (UZB); L 0000–0011 | Did not advance | |
| Sasha Mehmedovic | −66 kg | Bye | Ibáñez (ECU); W 0011–0001 | Darbelet (FRA); L 0000–0001 | Did not advance | | Rguig (MAR); W 0201–0000 | Gadanov (RUS); L 0000–1000 | Did not advance | | |
| Nicholas Tritton | −73 kg | —N/a | Pina (POR); L 0000–0010 | Did not advance | | | | | | | |
| Keith Morgan | −100 kg | —N/a | Diek (DOM); W 1001–0000 | Brata (ROU); L 0000–1000 | Did not advance | | | | | | |

Women

| Athlete | Event | Round of 32 | Round of 16 | Quarterfinals | Semifinals | Repechage 1 | Repechage 2 | Repechage 3 | Final / BM | |
| Athlete | Event | Opposition Result | Opposition Result | Opposition Result | Opposition Result | Opposition Result | Opposition Result | Opposition Result | Opposition Result | Rank |
|---|---|---|---|---|---|---|---|---|---|---|
| Marylise Levesque | −78 kg | Bye | Grant (AUS); W 1000–0000 | Yang Xl (CHN); L 0000–1000 | Did not advance | | Bye | Lkhamdegd (MGL); L 0110–0110 | Did not advance | |

== Modern pentathlon ==
Josh Riker-Fox and Monica Pinette qualified for Beijing by respectively finishing third and second at the 2007 Pan-American Games and Kara Grant qualified via the world rankings.

| Athlete | Event | Shooting (10 m air pistol) | | | Fencing (épée one touch) | | | Swimming (200 m freestyle) | | | Riding (show jumping) | | | Running (3000 m) | | | Total points | Final rank |
| Athlete | Event | Points | Rank | MP Points | Results | Rank | MP points | Time | Rank | MP points | Penalties | Rank | MP points | Time | Rank | MP Points | Total points | Final rank |
|---|---|---|---|---|---|---|---|---|---|---|---|---|---|---|---|---|---|---|
| Josh Riker-Fox | Men's | 171 | 32 | 988 | 15–20 | 24 | 760 | 2:11.54 | 32 | 1224 | 108 | 8 | 1092 | 9:33.46 | 18 | 1108 | 5172 | 24 |
| Kara Grant | Women's | 178 | 16 | 1072 | 15–20 | =24 | 760 | 2:45.26 | 36 | 940 | 140 | 25 | 1060 | 10:44.45 | 16 | 1144 | 4976 | 31 |
| Monica Pinette | Women's | 187 | 2 | 1180 | 11–24 | 33 | 664 | 2:29.95 | 34 | 1124 | 56 | 14 | 1144 | 11:00.45 | 23 | 1080 | 5192 | 27 |

== Rowing ==
Canada sent eight boats to Beijing in rowing, of which four (half of the quota) finished with medals.

Men

| Athlete | Event | Heats | | Repechage | | Semifinals | | Final | |
| Athlete | Event | Time | Rank | Time | Rank | Time | Rank | Time | Rank |
|---|---|---|---|---|---|---|---|---|---|
| Dave Calder; Scott Frandsen | Pair | 6:54.88 | 3 SA/B | Bye | | 6:34.02 | 1 FA | 6:39.55 | 2nd place, silver medalist(s) |
| John Sasi; Douglas Vandor; Cameron Sylvester | Lightweight double sculls | 6:17.58 | 2 SA/B | Bye | | 6:49.28 | 6 FB | 6:40.80 | 12 |
| Jon Beare; Iain Brambell; Mike Lewis; Liam Parsons | Lightweight four | 5:52.13 | 2 SA/B | Bye | | 6:07.86 | 2 FA | 5:50.09 | 3rd place, bronze medalist(s) |
| Andrew Byrnes; Kyle Hamilton; Malcolm Howard; Adam Kreek; Kevin Light; Brian Price (cox); Ben Rutledge; Dominic Sieterle; Jake Wetzel | Eight | 5:27:69 | 1 FA | Bye | | —N/a | | 5:23.89 | 1st place, gold medalist(s) |

Women

| Athlete | Event | Heats | | Repechage | | Semifinals | | Final | |
| Athlete | Event | Time | Rank | Time | Rank | Time | Rank | Time | Rank |
|---|---|---|---|---|---|---|---|---|---|
| Zoe Hoskins; Sabrina Kolker | Pair | BUW | 5 R | 7:40.22 | 4 FB | —N/a | | 7:37.27 | 9 |
| Tracy Cameron; Melanie Kok | Lightweight double sculls | 6:54.07 | 2 SA/B | Bye | | 7:10.70 | 1 FA | 6:56.68 | 3rd place, bronze medalist(s) |
| Rachelle de Jong; Anna-Marie de Zwager; Krista Guloien; Janine Hanson | Quadruple sculls | 6:23.27 | 3 R | 6:46.60 | 5 FB | —N/a | | 6:28.78 | 8 |
| Sarah Bonikowsky; Ashley Brzozowicz; Heather Mandoli; Darcy Marquardt; Andréanne Morin; Jane Rumball; Romina Stefancic; Lesley Thompson-Willie (cox); Buffy-Lynne Williams | Eight | 6:12:68 | 3 R | 6:10.50 | 1 FA | —N/a | | 6:08.04 | 4 |

Qualification Legend: FA=Final A (medal); FB=Final B (non-medal); FC=Final C (non-medal); FD=Final D (non-medal); FE=Final E (non-medal); FF=Final F (non-medal); SA/B=Semifinals A/B; SC/D=Semifinals C/D; SE/F=Semifinals E/F; QF=Quarterfinals; R=Repechage

== Sailing ==
Canada earned a quota in all the classes above during the 2007 ISAF Sailing World Championships held in Cascais, Portugal, except for the quota in the Tornado class, which was earned at the 2008 Tornado World Championships in Auckland, New Zealand.

Men

| Athlete | Event | Race | | | | | | | | | | | Net points | Final rank |
| Athlete | Event | 1 | 2 | 3 | 4 | 5 | 6 | 7 | 8 | 9 | 10 | M* | Net points | Final rank |
|---|---|---|---|---|---|---|---|---|---|---|---|---|---|---|
| Zac Plavsic | RS:X | 23 | 25 | 22 | 21 | ~~30~~ | 12 | 26 | 12 | 29 | 11 | EL | 211 | 23 |
| Mike Leigh | Laser | 13 | 23 | 26 | 5 | 4 | 3 | ~~28~~ | 2 | 19 | CAN | 14 | 137 | 9 |
| Oliver Bone; Stephane Locas | 470 | 25 | 26 | ~~30~~ | 20 | 23 | 22 | 30 | 18 | 26 | 16 | EL | 235 | 29 |

Women

| Athlete | Event | Race | | | | | | | | | | | Net points | Final rank |
| Athlete | Event | 1 | 2 | 3 | 4 | 5 | 6 | 7 | 8 | 9 | 10 | M* | Net points | Final rank |
|---|---|---|---|---|---|---|---|---|---|---|---|---|---|---|
| Nikola Girke | RS:X | 11 | 14 | 13 | 14 | 12 | 15 | 13 | ~~DNF~~ | 18 | 15 | EL | 153 | 17 |
| Lisa Ross | Laser Radial | 16 | 23 | 13 | 11 | 7 | 9 | ~~29~~ | 25 | 7 | CAN | EL | 140 | 17 |
| Katie Abbott; Martha Henderson; Jennifer Provan | Yngling | 5 | 4 | 10 | ~~15~~ | 9 | 12 | 11 | 15 | CAN | CAN | EL | 81 | 13 |

Open

| Athlete | Event | Race | | | | | | | | | | | | | | | | Net points | Final rank |
| Athlete | Event | 1 | 2 | 3 | 4 | 5 | 6 | 7 | 8 | 9 | 10 | 11 | 12 | 13 | 14 | 15 | M* | Net points | Final rank |
|---|---|---|---|---|---|---|---|---|---|---|---|---|---|---|---|---|---|---|---|
| Chris Cook | Finn | 8 | 3 | 7 | 10 | ~~23~~ | 5 | 15 | 3 | CAN | CAN | —N/a | | | | | 16 | 90 | 5 |
| Gordon Cook; Ben Remocker | 49er | 13 | 12 | 13 | 10 | 7 | 6 | 16 | 16 | 10 | ~~18~~ | 15 | 16 | CAN | CAN | CAN | EL | 152 | 14 |
| Oskar Johansson; Kevin Stittle | Tornado | 8 | 3 | 9 | 9 | 1 | ~~15~~ | 11 | 12 | 2 | 2 | —N/a | | | | | 4 | 76 | 4 |

M = Medal race; EL = Eliminated – did not advance into the medal race; CAN = Race cancelled;

== Shooting ==
Four shooters represented Canada in Beijing.

Men

| Athlete | Event | Qualification | | Final | |
| Athlete | Event | Points | Rank | Points | Rank |
|---|---|---|---|---|---|
| Giuseppe di Salvatore | Trap | 112 | 26 | Did not advance | |
| Giuseppe di Salvatore | Double trap | 109 | 19 | Did not advance | |
| Johannes Sauer | 50 m rifle prone | 587 | 44 | Did not advance | |

Women

| Athlete | Event | Qualification | | Final | |
| Athlete | Event | Points | Rank | Points | Rank |
|---|---|---|---|---|---|
| Avianna Chao | 10 m air pistol | 370 | 39 | Did not advance | |
| Avianna Chao | 25 m pistol | 558 | 41 | Did not advance | |
| Susan Nattrass | Trap | 63 | 11 | Did not advance | |

== Softball ==
Women's Softball

- Lauren Bay Regula
- Alison Bradley
- Erin Cumpstone
- Danielle Lawrie
- Sheena Lawrick
- Caitlin Lever
- Robin Mackin
- Noemie Marin
- Melanie Matthews
- Erin McLean
- Dione Meier
- Kaleigh Rafter
- Jennifer Salling
- Megan Timpf
- Jennifer Yee

Results

Round Robin
All times are China Standard Time (UTC+8)

| Rank | Team | W | L | RF | RA | WIN% | GB |
|---|---|---|---|---|---|---|---|
| 4 | Canada | 3 | 4 | 17 | 23 | .429 | 4 |

| Team | 1 | 2 | 3 | 4 | 5 | 6 | 7 | R | H | E |
|---|---|---|---|---|---|---|---|---|---|---|
| Chinese Taipei | 0 | 0 | 0 | 0 | 0 | 0 | 1 | 1 | 2 | 2 |
| Canada | 0 | 2 | 2 | 0 | 0 | 2 | 0 | 6 | 11 | 0 |
WP: Lauren Bay Regula(1–0) LP: Chia-Yen Wu(0–1); Home runs: TPE: Chia-Ching Ll(1); CAN: None

| Team | 1 | 2 | 3 | 4 | 5 | 6 | 7 | R | H | E |
|---|---|---|---|---|---|---|---|---|---|---|
| Canada | 0 | 0 | 3 | 4 | 1 | 1 | X | 9 | 11 | 1 |
| Netherlands | 0 | 0 | 0 | 1 | 1 | 0 | X | 2 | 3 | 1 |
WP: Danielle Lawrie(1–0) LP: Kristi de Varies(0–2); Home runs: CAN: Kayleigh Rafter(1), Melanie Matthews(1); NED: Sandra Gouverneur(1)

| Team | 1 | 2 | 3 | 4 | 5 | 6 | 7 | R | H | E |
|---|---|---|---|---|---|---|---|---|---|---|
| Canada | 1 | 0 | 0 | 0 | 0 | 0 | 0 | 1 | 1 | 3 |
| United States | 0 | 0 | 0 | 0 | 0 | 4 | 4 | 8 | 6 | 1 |
WP: Cat Osterman(2–0) LP: Dione Meier(0–1)

| Team | 1 | 2 | 3 | 4 | 5 | 6 | 7 | R | H | E |
|---|---|---|---|---|---|---|---|---|---|---|
| China | 0 | 0 | 0 | 0 | 0 | 0 | 0 | 0 | 2 | 0 |
| Canada | 0 | 0 | 0 | 0 | 0 | 1 | 0 | 1 | 3 | 2 |
WP: Lauren Bay Regula(2–0) LP: Wei Lu(1–1); Home runs: CHN: None; CAN: Jennifer Yee(1)

| Team | 1 | 2 | 3 | 4 | 5 | 6 | 7 | R | H | E |
|---|---|---|---|---|---|---|---|---|---|---|
| Venezuela | 1 | 0 | 0 | 1 | 0 | 0 | 0 | 2 | 4 | 0 |
| Canada | 0 | 0 | 0 | 0 | 0 | 0 | 0 | 0 | 5 | 0 |
WP: Mariangee Bogado(2–1) LP: Danielle Lawrie(1–1); Home runs: VEN: Yuruby Alicart(1); CAN: None

| Team | 1 | 2 | 3 | 4 | 5 | 6 | 7 | R | H | E |
|---|---|---|---|---|---|---|---|---|---|---|
| Australia | 0 | 0 | 0 | 0 | 0 | 1 | 3 | 4 | 4 | 0 |
| Canada | 0 | 0 | 0 | 0 | 0 | 0 | 0 | 0 | 3 | 0 |
WP: Tanya Harding(2–1) LP: Lauren Bay Regula(2–1)

| Team | 1 | 2 | 3 | 4 | 5 | 6 | 7 | R | H | E |
|---|---|---|---|---|---|---|---|---|---|---|
| Canada | 0 | 0 | 0 | 0 | 0 | 0 | 0 | 0 | 4 | 3 |
| Japan | 0 | 2 | 2 | 0 | 0 | 2 | 0 | 6 | 9 | 0 |
WP: Yukiko Ueno (3–0) LP: Lauren Bay Regula (2–2)

== Swimming ==
The places in Canada's Olympic swim team were allocated at the 2008 CN Olympic Trials.

Men

| Athlete | Event | Heat | | Semifinal | | Final | |
| Athlete | Event | Time | Rank | Time | Rank | Time | Rank |
|---|---|---|---|---|---|---|---|
| Joe Bartoch | 100 m butterfly | 52.90 | 34 | Did not advance | | | |
| Keith Beavers | 200 m backstroke | 1:58.84 | 15 Q | 1:58.50 | 12 | Did not advance | |
| Keith Beavers | 200 m individual medley | 1:59.19 | 8 Q | 1:59.43 | 8 Q | 1:59.43 | 7 |
| Keith Beavers | 400 m individual medley | 4:12.75 | 9 | —N/a | | Did not advance | |
| Mathieu Bois | 100 m breaststroke | 1:01.45 | 28 | Did not advance | | | |
| Mathieu Bois | 200 m breaststroke | 2:12.87 | 29 | Did not advance | | | |
| Mike Brown | 100 m breaststroke | 1:00.98 | 20 | Did not advance | | | |
| Mike Brown | 200 m breaststroke | 2:09.84 NR | 5 Q | 2:08.84 NR | 2 Q | 2:09.03 | 4 |
| Ryan Cochrane | 400 m freestyle | 3:44.85 NR | 9 | —N/a | | Did not advance | |
| Ryan Cochrane | 1500 m freestyle | 14:40.84 AM | 2 Q | —N/a | | 14:42.69 | 3rd place, bronze medalist(s) |
| Joel Greenshields | 100 m freestyle | 49.04 | 23 | Did not advance | | | |
| Brent Hayden | 100 m freestyle | 47.84 | 3 Q | 48.20 | 11 | Did not advance | |
| Brent Hayden | 200 m freestyle | 1:46.40 | 3 Q | Withdrew | | | |
| Richard Hortness | 50 m freestyle | 22.42 | 27 | Did not advance | | | |
| Brian Johns | 200 m individual medley | 2:00.66 | 18 | Did not advance | | | |
| Brian Johns | 400 m individual medley | 4:11.41 NR | 7 Q | —N/a | | 4:13.38 | 7 |
| Tobias Oriwol | 200 m backstroke | 1:58.84 | 16 Q | 1:59.50 | 15 | Did not advance | |
| Colin Russell | 200 m freestyle | 1:46.58 | 5 Q | 1:48.13 | 14 | Did not advance | |
| Adam Sioui | 100 m butterfly | 53.38 | 39 | Did not advance | | | |
| Adam Sioui | 200 m butterfly | 1:57.45 | 25 | Did not advance | | | |
| Jake Tapp | 100 m backstroke | 55.54 | 31 | Did not advance | | | |
| Joel Greenshields; Brent Hayden; Richard Hortness; Colin Russell; Rick Say | 4 × 100 m freestyle relay | 3:13.68 NR | 7 Q | —N/a | | 3:12.26 NR | 6 |
| Brent Hayden; Andrew Hurd; Brian Johns; Colin Russell; Rick Say; Adam Sioui | 4 × 200 m freestyle relay | 7:08.04 NR | 5 Q | —N/a | | 7:05.77 NR | 5 |
| Joe Bartoch; Mike Brown; Brent Hayden; Jake Tapp | 4 × 100 m medley relay | 3:35.56 | 10 | —N/a | | Did not advance | |

Women

| Athlete | Event | Heat | | Semifinal | | Final | |
| Athlete | Event | Time | Rank | Time | Rank | Time | Rank |
|---|---|---|---|---|---|---|---|
| Stephanie Horner | 200 m freestyle | 1:58.35 | 17 | Did not advance | | | |
| Stephanie Horner | 400 m freestyle | 4:07.45 | 11 | —N/a | | Did not advance | |
| Stephanie Horner | 200 m butterfly | 2:10.33 | 20 | Did not advance | | | |
| Tanya Hunks | 800 m freestyle | 8:38.05 | 23 | —N/a | | Did not advance | |
| Tanya Hunks | 400 m individual medley | 4:40.63 | 20 | —N/a | | Did not advance | |
| Savannah King | 400 m freestyle | 4:11.49 | 19 | —N/a | | Did not advance | |
| Alexa Komarnycky | 400 m individual medley | 4:46.98 | 29 | —N/a | | Did not advance | |
| Audrey Lacroix | 100 m butterfly | 59.10 | 28 | Did not advance | | | |
| Audrey Lacroix | 200 m butterfly | 2:08.54 | 12 Q | 2:09.74 | 13 | Did not advance | |
| Erica Morningstar | 100 m freestyle | 54.66 | 15 Q | 55.36 | 15 | Did not advance | |
| Erica Morningstar | 200 m individual medley | 2:14.11 | 19 | Did not advance | | | |
| Annamay Pierse | 100 m breaststroke | 1:08.25 | 13 Q | 1:08.27 | 10 | Did not advance | |
| Annamay Pierse | 200 m breaststroke | 2:25.01 | 7 Q | 2:23.94 | 5 Q | 2:23.77 NR | 6 |
| Victoria Poon | 50 m freestyle | 25.58 | 30 | Did not advance | | | |
| Geneviève Saumur | 200 m freestyle | 3:00.49 | 25 | Did not advance | | | |
| Lindsay Seemann | 200 m backstroke | 2:15.07 | 30 | Did not advance | | | |
| Jillian Tyler | 100 m breaststroke | 1:08.13 NR | 10 Q | 1:09.00 | 13 | Did not advance | |
| Julia Wilkinson | 100 m freestyle | 54.70 | 16 Q | Withdrew | | | |
| Julia Wilkinson | 100 m backstroke | 1:00.38 | 10 Q | 1:00.60 | 12 | Did not advance | |
| Julia Wilkinson | 200 m backstroke | DNS | | Did not advance | | | |
| Julia Wilkinson | 200 m individual medley | 2:12.26 NR | 13 Q | 2:12.03 NR | 5 Q | 2:12.43 | 7 |
| Jennifer Beckberger; Audrey Lacroix; Erica Morningstar; Geneviève Saumur; Julia Wilkinson | 4 × 100 m freestyle relay | 3:38.82 NR | 7 Q | —N/a | | 3:38.32 NR | 8 |
| Stephanie Horner; Erica Morningstar; Kevyn Peterson; Geneviève Saumur; Julia Wilkinson | 4 × 200 m freestyle relay | 7:56.26 NR | 10 | —N/a | | Did not advance | |
| Audrey Lacroix; Erica Morningstar; Annamay Pierse; Julia Wilkinson | 4 × 100 m medley relay | 4:02.13 | 8 Q | —N/a | | 4:01.35 | 7 |

== Synchronized swimming ==
Canada qualified for both events by finishing third in the team event at the "Good Luck Beijing" 2008 Olympic Games Synchronized Swimming Qualification Tournament.

| Athlete | Event | Technical routine | | Free routine (preliminary) | | | Free routine (final) | | |
| Athlete | Event | Points | Rank | Points | Total (technical + free) | Rank | Points | Total (technical + free) | Rank |
|---|---|---|---|---|---|---|---|---|---|
| Marie-Pier Boudreau Gagnon; Isabelle Rampling | Duet | 47.417 | 6 | 47.333 | 94.750 | 6 Q | 47.667 | 95.084 | 6 |
| Marie-Pier Boudreau Gagnon; Jessika Dubuc; Marie-Pierre Gagné; Dominika Kopcik; Eve Lamoureux; Tracy Little; Élise Marcotte; Isabelle Rampling; Jennifer Song | Team | 47.584 | =5 | —N/a | | | 48.084 | 96.167 | 4 |

== Table tennis ==
Canada sent five table tennis players to Beijing.

Singles

| Athlete | Event | Preliminary round | Round 1 | Round 2 | Round 3 | Round 4 | Quarterfinals | Semifinals | Final / BM | |
| Athlete | Event | Opposition Result | Opposition Result | Opposition Result | Opposition Result | Opposition Result | Opposition Result | Opposition Result | Opposition Result | Rank |
|---|---|---|---|---|---|---|---|---|---|---|
| Pradeeban Peter-Paul | Men's singles | Tsuboi (BRA); L 3–4 | Did not advance | | | | | | | |
| Zhang Peng | Men's singles | St. Louis (TRI); W 4–0 | Kishikawa (JPN); L 2–4 | Did not advance | | | | | | |
| Judy Long | Women's singles | Ramos (VEN); L 1–4 | Did not advance | | | | | | | |
| Zhang Mo | Women's singles | Medina (COL); W 4–0 | Kostromina (BLR); L 0–4 | Did not advance | | | | | | |

Team

| Athlete | Event | Group round | | Semifinals | Bronze playoff 1 | Bronze playoff 2 | Bronze medal | Final | |
| Athlete | Event | Opposition Result | Rank | Opposition Result | Opposition Result | Opposition Result | Opposition Result | Opposition Result | Rank |
|---|---|---|---|---|---|---|---|---|---|
| Pradeeban Peter-Paul; Shen Qiang; Zhang Peng | Men's team | Group B Germany; L 0 – 3 Croatia; L 0 – 3 Singapore; L 0 – 3 | 4 | Did not advance | | | | | |

== Taekwondo ==
Canada's Sébastien Michaud and Ivett Gonda qualified Canada in the men's −80 kg and the women's −49 kg by respectively finishing first and third at the World Taekwondo Qualification Tournament in Manchester, United Kingdom. World champion Karine Sergerie secured an additional berth for Canada, this time in the women's −67 kg, by finishing second at the Pan American Taekwondo Qualification Tournament in Cali, Colombia. In Beijing 2008, Sergerie made Silver after advancing to the finals opposite to Kyungseon of Korea who secured the gold.

| Athlete | Event | Round of 16 | Quarterfinals | Semifinals | Repechage | Bronze Medal | Final | |
| Athlete | Event | Opposition Result | Opposition Result | Opposition Result | Opposition Result | Opposition Result | Opposition Result | Rank |
|---|---|---|---|---|---|---|---|---|
| Sébastien Michaud | Men's −80 kg | Román (PUR); W 2–1 | Ahmadov (AZE); L 0–0 SUP | Did not advance | | | | |
| Ivett Gonda | Women's −49 kg | Zajc (SWE); L 0–2 | Did not advance | | | | | |
| Karine Sergerie | Women's −67 kg | Morgan (AUS); W 0–0 SUP | Sánchez (ARG); W 3–0 | Ocasio (PUR); W 3–0 | Bye | | Hwang K-S (KOR); L 1–2 | 2nd place, silver medalist(s) |

== Tennis ==
Canada was represented by three men in tennis.

| Athlete | Event | Round of 64 | Round of 32 | Round of 16 | Quarterfinals | Semifinals | Final / BM | |
| Athlete | Event | Opposition Score | Opposition Score | Opposition Score | Opposition Score | Opposition Score | Opposition Score | Rank |
|---|---|---|---|---|---|---|---|---|
| Frank Dancevic | Men's singles | Wawrinka (SUI); L 4–6, 6–3, 2–6 | Did not advance | | | | | |
| Frédéric Niemeyer | Men's singles | Cañas (ARG); L 3–6, 2–4^{r} | Did not advance | | | | | |
| Daniel Nestor; Frédéric Niemeyer | Men's doubles | —N/a | | A Murray / J Murray (GBR); L 4–6, 6–3, 4–6 | Did not advance | | | |

== Triathlon ==
Canada is one of five nations sending a full complement of six triathletes to Beijing.

| Athlete | Event | Swim (1.5 km) | Trans 1 | Bike (40 km) | Trans 2 | Run (10 km) | Total Time | Rank |
|---|---|---|---|---|---|---|---|---|
| Colin Jenkins | Men's | 18:12 | 0:29 | 58:59 | 0:31 | 38:39 | 1:56:50.85 | 50 |
| Paul Tichelaar | Men's | 18:24 | 0:27 | 58:51 | 0:30 | 33:34 | 1:51:46.81 | 28 |
| Simon Whitfield | Men's | 18:18 | 0:27 | 58:56 | 0:29 | 30:48 | 1:48:58.47 | 2nd place, silver medalist(s) |
| Lauren Groves | Women's | 20:05 | Did not finish | | | | | |
| Carolyn Murray | Women's | 20:55 | 0:29 | 1:05:28 | 0:33 | 37:31 | 2:04:56.32 | 29 |
| Kathy Tremblay | Women's | 19:52 | 0:28 | 1:04:24 | 0:35 | 40:04 | 2:05:23.49 | 31 |

== Water polo ==
=== Men's tournament ===
Canada's men's team qualified by reaching the semifinal at the FINA men's Water Polo Olympic Qualification Tournament, beating host Romania 9–8. The team finished in 11th place.

Roster

The following is the Canadian roster in the men's water polo tournament of the 2008 Summer Olympics.

| № | Name | Pos. | Height | Weight | Date of birth | Club |
|---|---|---|---|---|---|---|
| 1 | Robin Randall | GK | 1.97 m (6 ft 6 in) | 85 kg (187 lb) | 1 May 1980 | (Canada) Regina Squids |
| 2 | Con Kudaba | CB | 1.89 m (6 ft 2 in) | 88 kg (194 lb) | 17 May 1987 | (Canada) Fraser Valley |
| 3 | Devon Diggle | D | 1.83 m (6 ft 0 in) | 83 kg (183 lb) | 15 June 1988 | (Canada) DDO Montreal |
| 4 | Kevin Mitchell | D | 1.81 m (5 ft 11 in) | 80 kg (180 lb) | 21 June 1981 | (Canada) Fraser Valley |
| 5 | Justin Boyd | D | 1.83 m (6 ft 0 in) | 86 kg (190 lb) | 23 April 1989 | (Canada) DDO Montreal |
| 6 | Thomas Marks | CB | 1.90 m (6 ft 3 in) | 90 kg (200 lb) | 2 June 1980 | (Canada) Vancouver Vikings |
| 7 | Brandon Jung | D | 1.90 m (6 ft 3 in) | 88 kg (194 lb) | 28 April 1986 | (Canada) Storm Vancouver |
| 8 | Kevin Graham | D | 1.98 m (6 ft 6 in) | 94 kg (207 lb) | 21 April 1986 | (Canada) Regina Squids |
| 9 | Aaron Feltham | D | 1.90 m (6 ft 3 in) | 94 kg (207 lb) | 16 April 1982 | (Canada) Lindsay |
| 10 | Sasa Palamarevic | CF | 1.96 m (6 ft 5 in) | 100 kg (220 lb) | 16 July 1986 | (Canada) Hull |
| 11 | Jean Sayegh | D | 1.96 m (6 ft 5 in) | 95 kg (209 lb) | 18 June 1981 | (Canada) Les Hydres de Quebec |
| 12 | Nathaniel Miller | CF | 1.86 m (6 ft 1 in) | 95 kg (209 lb) | 21 September 1979 | (Canada) DDO Montreal |
| 13 | Nic Youngblud | GK | 1.80 m (5 ft 11 in) | 80 kg (180 lb) | 16 January 1981 | (Canada) Hamilton Aquatic |

Head coach: Dragan Jovanović

Group play

| Team | Pld | W | D | L | GF | GA | GD | Pts | Qualification |
|---|---|---|---|---|---|---|---|---|---|
| Hungary | 5 | 4 | 1 | 0 | 60 | 36 | +24 | 9 | Qualified for the semifinals |
| Spain | 5 | 4 | 0 | 1 | 52 | 34 | +18 | 8 | Qualified for the quarterfinals |
| Montenegro | 5 | 2 | 2 | 1 | 43 | 33 | +10 | 6 | Qualified for the quarterfinals |
| Australia | 5 | 2 | 1 | 2 | 45 | 40 | +5 | 5 | Will play for places 7–10 |
| Greece | 5 | 1 | 0 | 4 | 39 | 56 | −17 | 2 | Will play for places 7–12 |
| Canada | 5 | 0 | 0 | 5 | 21 | 61 | −40 | 0 | Will play for places 7–12 |

All times are China Standard Time (UTC+8).

| 10 August 2008; 9:30 | Report | Spain | 16–6 | Canada | Ying Tung Natatorium, Beijing; Referees: Ciric (SRB), Ni (CHN) |
| 10 August 2008; 9:30 | Report | Score by quarters: 5–2, 4–2, 3–1, 4–1 | | | Ying Tung Natatorium, Beijing; Referees: Ciric (SRB), Ni (CHN) |
| 10 August 2008; 9:30 | Report | Molina 3, X. García 3, Piralkov 2, Vallès 2, F. Perrone 2 | Goals | Feltham 2 | Ying Tung Natatorium, Beijing; Referees: Ciric (SRB), Ni (CHN) |

| 12 August 2008; 9:30 | Report | Canada | 0–12 | Montenegro | Ying Tung Natatorium, Beijing; Referees: Knights (NZL), Pinker (RSA) |
| 12 August 2008; 9:30 | Report | Score by quarters: 0–3, 0–4, 0–4, 0–1 | | | Ying Tung Natatorium, Beijing; Referees: Knights (NZL), Pinker (RSA) |
| 12 August 2008; 9:30 | Report | - | Goals | Vukčević 2, M. Janović 2, Gojković 2 | Ying Tung Natatorium, Beijing; Referees: Knights (NZL), Pinker (RSA) |

| 14 August 2008; 15:20 | Report | Australia | 8–5 | Canada | Ying Tung Natatorium, Beijing; Referees: Bock (GER), Klopper (NED) |
| 14 August 2008; 15:20 | Report | Score by quarters: 2–3, 2–1, 3–1, 1–0 | | | Ying Tung Natatorium, Beijing; Referees: Bock (GER), Klopper (NED) |
| 14 August 2008; 15:20 | Report | Figlioli 3, Franklin 2 | Goals | Feltham 2 | Ying Tung Natatorium, Beijing; Referees: Bock (GER), Klopper (NED) |

| 16 August 2008; 10:50 | Report | Canada | 7–13 | Greece | Ying Tung Natatorium, Beijing; Referees: Hart (AUS), Ni (CHN) |
| 16 August 2008; 10:50 | Report | Score by quarters: 1–6, 4–5, 2–1, 0–1 | | | Ying Tung Natatorium, Beijing; Referees: Hart (AUS), Ni (CHN) |
| 16 August 2008; 10:50 | Report | Graham 3, Feltham 3 | Goals | Ntoskas 4, Theodoropoulos 3 | Ying Tung Natatorium, Beijing; Referees: Hart (AUS), Ni (CHN) |

| 18 August 2008; 10:50 | Report | Hungary | 12–3 | Canada | Ying Tung Natatorium, Beijing; Referees: Ciric (SRB), Littlejohn (GBR) |
| 18 August 2008; 10:50 | Report | Score by quarters: 3–1, 3–0, 1–2, 5–0 | | | Ying Tung Natatorium, Beijing; Referees: Ciric (SRB), Littlejohn (GBR) |
| 18 August 2008; 10:50 | Report | Madaras 2, Kásás 2, Biros 2, Molnár 2 | Goals | Graham 2 | Ying Tung Natatorium, Beijing; Referees: Ciric (SRB), Littlejohn (GBR) |

Classification round (7th–12th place)

| 20 August 2008; 09:30 | Report | Canada | 11–13 | Italy | Ying Tung Natatorium, Beijing; Referees: Rak (CRO), Ni (CHN) |
| 20 August 2008; 09:30 | Report | Score by quarters: 1–4, 3–2, 3–3, 4–4 | | | Ying Tung Natatorium, Beijing; Referees: Rak (CRO), Ni (CHN) |
| 20 August 2008; 09:30 | Report | Graham 4, Miller 2 | Goals | Sottani 3, Gallo 2, Felugo 2, Calcaterra 2 | Ying Tung Natatorium, Beijing; Referees: Rak (CRO), Ni (CHN) |

Classification round (11th–12th place)

| 22 August 2008; 09:30 | Report | Canada | 8–7 | China | Ying Tung Natatorium, Beijing; Referees: Koryzna (POL), Argyros (GRE) |
| 22 August 2008; 09:30 | Report | Score by quarters: 1–1, 3–1, 1–2, 3–3 | | | Ying Tung Natatorium, Beijing; Referees: Koryzna (POL), Argyros (GRE) |
| 22 August 2008; 09:30 | Report | Boyd 2, Sayegh 2 | Goals | Yu 2, Han 2 | Ying Tung Natatorium, Beijing; Referees: Koryzna (POL), Argyros (GRE) |

== Weightlifting ==
Canada qualified three female Weightlifters by finishing fourteenth in the combined country ranking of the 2006 and 2007 World Weightlifting Championships. Canada then qualified two men's weightlifters by finishing second among non-qualified teams at the 2008 Pan American Championships held in Callao, Peru.

Christine Girard, who competed in the women's 63 kg category initially finished in fourth place. However, her performance was elevated to third place after the disqualification of the second place athlete from Kazakhstan, following the re-tests of the urine samples conducted by the IOC in 2016.

| Athlete | Event | Snatch | | Clean & Jerk | | Total | Rank |
| Athlete | Event | Result | Rank | Result | Rank | Total | Rank |
|---|---|---|---|---|---|---|---|
| Jasvir Singh | Men's −62 kg | 115 | 16 | 151 | 12 | 266 | 12 |
| Francis Luna-Grenier | Men's −69 kg | 131 | 21 | 162 | 17 | 293 | 17 |
| Marilou Dozois-Prevost | Women's −48 kg | 76 | 10 | 90 | 10 | 166 | 10 |
| Christine Girard | Women's −63 kg | 102 | 6 | 126 | 5 | 228 | 3rd place, bronze medalist(s) |
| Jeane Lassen | Women's −75 kg | 105 | 10 | 135 | 5 | 240 | 8 |

== Wrestling ==
Seven athletes qualified at the 2008 Pan-American Wrestling Championships while Travis Cross and Carol Huynh qualified by finishing in the top 8 at the 2007 Wrestling World Championships and David Zilberman qualified at the first freestyle qualification tournament.

Key:

- VT – Victory by Fall.
- PP – Decision by Points – the loser with technical points.
- PO – Decision by Points – the loser without technical points.

Men's freestyle

| Athlete | Event | Qualification | Round of 16 | Quarterfinal | Semifinal | Repechage 1 | Repechage 2 | Final / BM | |
| Athlete | Event | Opposition Result | Opposition Result | Opposition Result | Opposition Result | Opposition Result | Opposition Result | Opposition Result | Rank |
|---|---|---|---|---|---|---|---|---|---|
| Saeed Azarbayjani | −60 kg | Bye | Berberyan (ARM); W 3–0 ^{PO} | Mohammadi (IRI); L 0–3 ^{PO} | Did not advance | | | | 10 |
| Haislan Garcia | −66 kg | Bye | Taghavi (IRI); L 1–3 ^{PP} | Did not advance | | | | | 16 |
| Matt Gentry | −74 kg | Bye | Bentinidis (GRE); L 1–3 ^{PP} | Did not advance | | | | | 18 |
| Travis Cross | −84 kg | Bye | Balcı (TUR); L 1–3 ^{PP} | Did not advance | | | | | 15 |
| David Zilberman | −96 kg | Bye | Kurbanov (UZB); L 1–3 ^{PP} | Did not advance | | | | | 14 |

Men's Greco-Roman

| Athlete | Event | Qualification | Round of 16 | Quarterfinal | Semifinal | Repechage 1 | Repechage 2 | Final / BM | |
| Athlete | Event | Opposition Result | Opposition Result | Opposition Result | Opposition Result | Opposition Result | Opposition Result | Opposition Result | Rank |
|---|---|---|---|---|---|---|---|---|---|
| Ari Taub | −120 kg | Bye | Deák-Bárdos (HUN); L 1–3 ^{PP} | Did not advance | | | | | 16 |

Women's freestyle

| Athlete | Event | Qualification | Round of 16 | Quarterfinal | Semifinal | Repechage 1 | Repechage 2 | Final / BM | |
| Athlete | Event | Opposition Result | Opposition Result | Opposition Result | Opposition Result | Opposition Result | Opposition Result | Opposition Result | Rank |
|---|---|---|---|---|---|---|---|---|---|
| Carol Huynh | −48 kg | Bye | Stadnik (AZE); W 3–1 ^{PP} | Kim H-J (KOR); W 3–1 ^{PP} | Bakatyuk (KAZ); W 3–1 ^{PP} | Bye | | C Icho (JPN); W 3–1 ^{PP} | 1st place, gold medalist(s) |
| Tonya Verbeek | −55 kg | —N/a | Naidangiin (MGL); W 3–0 ^{PO} | Cristea (MDA); W 3–1 ^{PP} | Yoshida (JPN); L 0–3 ^{PO} | Bye | | Nerell (SWE); W 3–0 ^{PO} | 3rd place, bronze medalist(s) |
| Martine Dugrenier | −63 kg | Bye | Sastin (HUN); W 3–0 ^{PO} | Xu Hy (CHN); W 3–1 ^{PP} | K Icho (JPN); L 1–3 ^{PP} | Bye | | Miller (USA); L 1–3 ^{PP} | 5 |
| Ohenewa Akuffo | −72 kg | —N/a | Zlateva (BUL); L 0–5 ^{VT} | Did not advance | | Bye | Unda (ESP); L 1–3 ^{PP} | Did not advance | 10 |

== Official outfitter ==
HBC was the official outfitter of clothing for members of the Canadian Olympic team.

== See also ==
- Canada at the 2008 Summer Paralympics
- Canada at the 2007 Pan American Games
