= Nebraska Cornhuskers softball =

University of Nebraska–Lincoln softball team

- 2026 Nebraska Cornhuskers softball team
- Founded: 1976; 50 years ago
- University: University of Nebraska–Lincoln
- Athletic director: Troy Dannen
- Head coach: Rhonda Revelle (34th season)
- Conference: Big Ten
- Location: Lincoln, Nebraska
- Home stadium: Bowlin Stadium (capacity: 2,796)
- Nickname: Cornhuskers
- Colors: Scarlet and cream

NCAA WCWS runner-up
- 1985 (Note: Nebraska's 1985 national runner-up finish was vacated by the NCAA in 1986.)

NCAA WCWS appearances
- 1982, 1984, 1985, 1987, 1988, 1998, 2002, 2013, 2026

NCAA super regional appearances
- 2013, 2014, 2025, 2026

NCAA Tournament appearances
- 1982, 1984, 1985, 1987, 1988, 1995, 1996, 1997, 1998, 1999, 2000, 2001, 2002, 2003, 2004, 2005, 2006, 2007, 2009, 2010, 2011, 2013, 2014, 2015, 2016, 2022, 2023, 2025, 2026

Conference tournament championships
- 1982, 1984, 1985, 1986, 1987, 1988, 1998, 2000, 2004, 2022, 2026

Regular-season conference championships
- 1982, 1984, 1985, 1986, 1987, 1988, 1998, 2001, 2004, 2014, 2026

The Nebraska Cornhuskers softball team competes as part of NCAA Division I, representing the University of Nebraska–Lincoln in the Big Ten Conference. The team has played at Bowlin Stadium since 2002.

The program was founded in 1976 as a club sport and became an officially sanctioned varsity sport the next year. Nebraska has made twenty-eight appearances in the NCAA Division I tournament with nine Women's College World Series berths. Longtime head coach Rhonda Revelle is the school's leader in career victories across all sports.

== History ==
=== Early success ===
Nebraska's softball program began in 1976 as a club sport and was officially sanctioned as a varsity sport in 1977 in the wake of Title IX. Don Isherwood led the program in its early years but was fired in 1980 as the university wanted a head coach with a college degree. NU hired Nancy Plantz, who led the Cornhuskers to the inaugural NCAA Division I Women's College World Series in 1982 (in its early years the tournament was held in Omaha, longtime host of the College World Series, meaning NU played the WCWS less than fifty miles from its Lincoln campus). Plantz's tenure ended in a disastrous 1983 season that was cut short by the university after player walkouts and a last-place conference finish.

Nebraska was nearly unable to field a team in 1984 before hiring former NAIA Coach of the Year Wayne Daigle to lead the program. Shortstop Denise Day was named the first All-American in program history and led the Cornhuskers to a school record for wins and a return to the WCWS. Daigle's second season saw the breakout of freshman pitcher Lori Sippel, whose no-hitter against Louisiana Tech in the WCWS opener helped Nebraska reach its first title game, where it lost to UCLA. Months later, Nebraska's national runner-up finish was vacated by the NCAA Committee on Infractions; according to the committee, Daigle allowed a redshirt player to travel with the team and purchased dinner for a recruit and her family. NU was ineligible for postseason play in 1986, which would be Daigle's last season at Nebraska. He resigned and returned to Texas, where he coached high school softball for the remainder of his career.

Athletic director Bob Devaney named pitching coach Ron Wolforth Daigle's successor. Wolforth led Nebraska back to the WCWS in each of his first two seasons, its fourth and fifth appearances in the event's first seven years. Wolforth's teams were less successful in the later years of his tenure and he grew weary of the NCAA's increasingly stringent rules and guidelines. He resigned in 1992 to start a baseball and softball academy in Vancouver.

=== Rhonda Revelle era ===
Devaney hired former Nebraska pitcher Rhonda Revelle to replace Wolforth in 1993. Revelle inherited a program that hadn't made the NCAA tournament since 1988 but soon returned NU to national relevance. Nebraska did not miss the tournament from 1995 to 2007 and became a fixture in the national top twenty-five. In 1998, Nebraska completed the first undefeated season in Big 12 history and returned to the Women's College World Series – Revelle became the third person to reach the WCWS as a player and a head coach, and the first to do it at the same school. Nebraska won at least fifty games in each of the next three seasons, culminating in another WCWS appearance in 2002. NU's run of twelve consecutive top-twenty-five national finishes ended in 2007, and the following year the program missed the NCAA tournament for the first time since 1994.

NU reached the WCWS in its second season in the Big Ten, the same year Revelle won her 768th game to pass former baseball coach John Sanders for the most victories by any coach at the university. Nebraska won the Big Ten for the first time in 2014. In 2019, Revelle was placed on paid administrative leave after allegations she harassed and emotionally abused players, but was reinstated after investigation without further punishment. Revelle won her 1,000th game at Nebraska in 2021. Revelle won her 1,200th game during a weekend series sweep over Rutgers in April 2026.

== Conference affiliations ==
- Big Eight Conference (1977–1995)
- Big 12 Conference (1996–2011)
- Big Ten Conference (2012–present)

== Coaches ==
=== Coaching history ===
No.	Coach	Tenure	Overall	Conference
1	Don Isherwood	1976–1980	106–85 (.555)	16–24 (.400)
2	Nancy Plantz	1981–1983	77–53 (.592)	17–16 (.515)
3	Wayne Daigle	1984–1986	110–31 (.780)	26–6 (.813)
4	Ron Wolforth	1987–1992	188–126 (.599)	29–25 (.537)
5	Rhonda Revelle	1993–present	1,222–688 (.640)	402–257 (.610)

=== Coaching staff ===
Name	Position	First year	Alma mater
Rhonda Revelle	Head coach	1993	Nebraska
Diane Miller	Associate head coach	2009	Missouri Southern State
Olivia Ferrell	Assistant coach	2024	Nebraska
Jordy Frahm	Assistant coach	2027	Nebraska
Mandie Nocita	Assistant coach	2027	Missouri Western State

== Venues ==
Nebraska played its first six seasons at Ballard Ballfield, a public park in Lincoln's Havelock District, before moving to the NU Softball Complex, which was located directly north of Mabel Lee Hall on the university campus. Bowlin Stadium has served as the program's home venue since it was built as part of the Haymarket Park complex in 2002. It has a listed capacity of 2,796, with nearly 1,000 chairback seats in addition to metal bleachers down the first base line and all-grass berms down both foul lines. Nebraska has ranked in the national top ten in attendance five times and hosted five NCAA Regionals since moving to Bowlin Stadium. On April 27, 2024, a stadium-record crowd of 2,691 saw Northwestern defeat Nebraska 8–1. Bowlin Stadium is adjacent to the larger Hawks Field, which hosts Nebraska's baseball team.

== Championships and awards ==
=== Conference championships ===
Regular season

- Big Eight: 1982, 1984, 1985, 1986, 1987, 1988
- Big 12: 1998, 2001, 2004
- Big Ten: 2014, 2026

Tournament

- Big Eight: 1982, 1984, 1985, 1986, 1987, 1988
- Big 12: 1998, 2000, 2004
- Big Ten: 2022, 2026

=== National awards ===
- USA Softball Collegiate Player of the Year: Jordy Frahm (2026)
- NFCA National Player of the Year: Jordy Frahm (2025, 2026)
- NFCA Catcher of the Year: Taylor Edwards (2014)
- Gold Glove Award: Courtney Wallace (2022)
- Honda Sports Award: Denise Day (1985), Jordy Frahm (2026)

=== Conference awards ===
Player of the year

- Big 12: Ali Viola (1995, 1998), Peaches James (2004)
- Big Ten: Jordy Bahl (2025)

Pitcher of the year

- Big 12: Tatum Edwards (2013)
- Big Ten: Jordy Bahl (2025, 2026)

Freshman of the year

- Big 12: Jennifer Lizama (1997)
- Big Ten: Ava Bredwell (2022), Alexis Jensen (2026)

Coach of the year

- Big 12: Rhonda Revelle (1998, 2001)
- Big Ten: Rhonda Revelle (2014, 2026)

=== All-Americans ===
Nebraska has had 20 players who have combined for 33 NFCA All-American awards. Ali Viola and Jordy (Bahl) Frahm are the only Cornhuskers to earn multiple first-team All-America honors; Frahm, who played two seasons at Oklahoma, was the fourteenth player in NCAA Division I history to be named a first-team All-American four times.

First Team

- Denise Day – 1985
- Lori Richins – 1986
- Ali Viola – 1996, 1998
- Jenny Voss – 1998
- Jennifer Lizama – 1999
- Taylor Edwards – 2014
- M. J. Knighten – 2016
- Jordy (Bahl) Frahm – 2025, 2026

Second Team

- Denise Day - 1984
- Lori Sippel - 1986, 1987
- Lori Richins - 1987
- Tobin Echo-Hawk - 1995
- Ali Viola - 1995
- Jennifer Lizama – 1997, 2000
- Christie McCoy - 1998
- Leigh Ann Walker - 2000
- Peaches James - 2004
- Tatum Edwards - 2013

Third Team

- Tobin Echo-Hawk - 1996
- Kim Ogee - 2002
- Anne Steffan - 2005
- Taylor Edwards - 2011
- Tatum Edwards - 2014
- Kiki Stokes - 2015, 2016
- Cam Ybarra - 2022
- Billie Andrews - 2023, 2024
- Alexis Jensen - 2026

== NCAA Division I tournament results ==
Nebraska has appeared in twenty-nine NCAA Division I tournaments with a record of 75-60, including eight trips to the Women's College World Series.

Year	Round	Opponent	Result
1982	Regional	Missouri	W 1–0, L 1–0, W 4–1
1982	Women's College World Series	Creighton; Arizona State; Fresno State	W 3–2; L 2–0; L 1–0
1984	Regional	Oklahoma State	W 3–2, W 2–1
1984	Women's College World Series	Fresno State; Texas A&M; Adelphi; UCLA	W 2–0; L 5–2; W 2–1; L 1–0
1985	Regional	Kansas	L 4–1, W 6–1, W 2–0
1985	Women's College World Series	Louisiana Tech; Cal Poly Pomona; Cal State Fullerton; UCLA	W 6–0; W 2–0; W 5–1; L 3–0, L 2–1
1987	Regional	Utah	W 6–0, W 3–2
1987	Women's College World Series	Fresno State; UCLA; Central Michigan; Texas A&M	W 1–0; L 3–0; W 2–1; L 4–0
1988	Regional	Iowa State; Creighton	W 5–2; L 3–2, W 7–2, W 4–1
1988	Women's College World Series	Cal Poly Pomona; Adelphi; Fresno State	L 3–0; W 5–1; L 1–0
1995	Regional	Florida State; Arizona	W 6–1, L 6–2; L 9–1
1996	Regional	Minnesota; Southwest Louisiana; Nicholls State	W 5–0; L 9–4; 2–0
1997	Regional	Arizona State; Arizona	W 10–1, W 2–1; L 2–0, L 5–1
1998	Regional	Coastal Carolina; Iowa; Oregon	W 7–0; W 1–0; W 9–7
1998	Women's College World Series	Fresno State; Texas; Washington	L 6–1; W 2–1; L 3–1
1999	Regional	Notre Dame; Arizona State; Florida Atlantic	W 2–0, W 4–3; L 1–0, W 2–1, L 4–2; W 4–2
2000	Regional	Illinois State; South Carolina; Arizona	W 8–0; W 11–1, W 9–0; L 13–0, L 5–0
2001	Regional	BYU; Pacific; Stanford	W 3–1; W 2–1, L 3–1; L 5–1
2002	Regional	UIC; Iowa; Oregon State; Notre Dame	W 1–0; W 3–0; W 7–0; W 5–3
2002	Women's College World Series	Arizona; Michigan; Florida State	L 1–0; W 1–0; L 4–3
2003	Regional	Hofstra; Pacific; Mississippi State; Iowa	L 3–1, W 6–0; W 11–7; W 8–0; L 2–1
2004	Regional	Lehigh; Creighton; California	W 6–0; W 2–0, W 3–1; L 2–0, L 2–0
2005	Regional	Iowa; Washington	W 4–0, L 1–0; L 7–6
2006	Regional	Iowa; California; Illinois State	W 1–0; L 4–2, L 6–1; W 3–1
2007	Regional	Georgia; Creighton	L 3–2; L 2–1
2009	Regional	Jacksonville State; Tennessee	W 4–2, L 4–1; L 5–2
2010	Regional	North Carolina; North Dakota State	L 1–0, L 1–0; W 5–1
2011	Regional	Fresno State; Pacific; Stanford	L 1–0, W 5–0; W 11–1; L 4–1
2013	Regional	Northern Iowa; Stanford	W 4–0; W 7–1, W 10–5
2013	Super regional	Oregon	W 5–2, L 4–3, W 4–2
2013	Women's College World Series	Washington; Florida	L 4–3; L 9–8
2014	Regional	Kansas; Bradley; Missouri	L 3–1, W 2–1; W 9–0; W 11–4, W 8–1
2014	Super regional	Alabama	L 6–5, L 2–1
2015	Regional	Arizona State; Texas Southern; LSU	L 5–2; W 5–0; L 3–2
2016	Regional	Louisville; Missouri; BYU	W 3–2; L 8–0, L 9–0; W 2–0
2022	Regional	North Texas; Oklahoma State	W 3–0, L 3–0; L 7–4
2023	Regional	Wichita State; UMBC; Oklahoma State	L 6–5, W 9–8; W 3–2; L 5–2
2025	Regional	Connecticut; Southeastern Louisiana	W 10–2; W 14–1, W 8–0
2025	Super regional	Tennessee	W 5–2, L 3–2, L 1–0
2026	Regional	South Dakota; Grand Canyon	W 4–1; W 2–0, W 1–0
2026	Super regional	Oklahoma State	W 8–1, W 9–1^{(5)}
2026	Women's College World Series	Arkansas; Alabama; Texas	W 5–3^{(10)} L 5–1; L 3–1

=== NCAA Tournament seeding history ===
National seeding began in 2005.

Years →	'13	'26
Seeds →	14	4

== Seasons ==
Regular season champion	Tournament champion	Regular season and tournament champion

Year	Coach	Overall	Conference	Standing	Postseason (Note: The AIAW ran the premier women's collegiate softball championship until the first NCAA Division I tournament was held in 1982.)	Final rank (Note: USA Today began weekly polling of college softball coaches in 1995.)
Big Eight Conference (1977–1995)
1977	Don Isherwood	12–15	1–4	T–4th		
1978	Don Isherwood	25–14	4–3	7th		
1979	Don Isherwood	33–18	3–8	6th		
1980	Don Isherwood	27–23	8–9	4th		
1981	Nancy Plantz	27–21	5–6	3rd		
1982	Nancy Plantz	33–14	9–3	1st	NCAA Division I College World Series	
1983	Nancy Plantz	17–18	3–7	7th		
1984	Wayne Daigle	39–13	6–2	1st	NCAA Division I College World Series	
1985	Wayne Daigle	33–8	11–1	1st	NCAA Division I runner-up	
1986	Wayne Daigle	38–10	9–3	1st		
1987	Ron Wolforth	41–11	8–2	1st	NCAA Division I College World Series	
1988	Ron Wolforth	39–20	7–3	1st	NCAA Division I College World Series	
1989	Ron Wolforth	32–28	6–4	3rd		
1990	Ron Wolforth	31–19	3–5	5th		
1991	Ron Wolforth	22–18	3–5	5th		
1992	Ron Wolforth	23–30	2–6	5th		
1993	Rhonda Revelle	18–23	5–11	5th		
1994	Rhonda Revelle	21–33	5–15	6th		
1995	Rhonda Revelle	43–20	10–6	3rd	NCAA Division I regional	18
Big 12 Conference (1996–2011)
1996	Rhonda Revelle	42–23	10–8	4th	NCAA Division I regional	18
1997	Rhonda Revelle	29–24	10–6	4th	NCAA Division I regional	25
1998	Rhonda Revelle	48–12	16–0	1st	NCAA Division I College World Series	5
1999	Rhonda Revelle	35–21	10–8	4th	NCAA Division I regional	20
2000	Rhonda Revelle	52–21	15–2	2nd	NCAA Division I regional	14
2001	Rhonda Revelle	51–15	16–2	1st	NCAA Division I regional	14
2002	Rhonda Revelle	50–14	11–5	2nd	NCAA Division I College World Series	6
2003	Rhonda Revelle	39–17	10–8	6th	NCAA Division I regional	13
2004	Rhonda Revelle	45–17	14–3	1st	NCAA Division I regional	14
2005	Rhonda Revelle	36–23	9–9	7th	NCAA Division I regional	25
2006	Rhonda Revelle	44–12	13–4	2nd	NCAA Division I regional	15
2007	Rhonda Revelle	37–20	10–8	5th	NCAA Division I regional	
2008	Rhonda Revelle	25–28	4–14	T–9th		
2009	Rhonda Revelle	35–19	9–9	5th	NCAA Division I regional	
2010	Rhonda Revelle	30–29	7–11	T–6th	NCAA Division I regional	
2011	Rhonda Revelle	41–14	9–9	6th	NCAA Division I regional	21
Big Ten Conference (2012–present)
2012	Rhonda Revelle	33–23	14–9	3rd		
2013	Rhonda Revelle	45–16	16–6	2nd	NCAA Division I College World Series	8
2014	Rhonda Revelle	44–18	18–5	T–1st	NCAA Division I super regional	16
2015	Rhonda Revelle	35–23	17–6	3rd	NCAA Division I regional	
2016	Rhonda Revelle	35–21	13–9	5th	NCAA Division I regional	
2017	Rhonda Revelle	24–29	13–10	5th		
2018	Rhonda Revelle	31–23	9–13	9th		
2019	Rhonda Revelle	21–31	9–14	T–8th		
2020	Rhonda Revelle	9–14	Canceled (COVID-19}			
2021	Rhonda Revelle	22–22		6th		
2022	Rhonda Revelle	41–16	17–5	2nd	NCAA Division I regional	
2023	Rhonda Revelle	36–22	13–10	4th	NCAA Division I regional	
2024	Rhonda Revelle	30–23	12–9	4th		
2025	Rhonda Revelle	43–15	17–5	3rd	NCAA Division I super regional	12
2026	Rhonda Revelle	52–8	23–1	1st	NCAA Division I College World Series	5
Total:		1,703–704 (.708)	490–328 (.599)			

== Olympians ==
Olympiad	City	Player (Note: Catcher Taylor Edwards served as an alternate on the United States's 2020 silver-medal team.)	Position	Country	Finish
1996 (XXXVI)	(United States) Atlanta	Lori Sippel	P	Canada	Group stage
2004 (XXVIII)	(Greece) Athens	Sheena Lawrick	1B	Canada	Preliminary round
2004 (XXVIII)	(Greece) Athens	Stephanie Skegas-Maxwell	P	Greece	Preliminary round
2008 (XXIX)	(China) Beijing	Sheena Lawrick	1B	Canada	Fourth place
2008 (XXIX)	(China) Beijing	Robin Mackin	P	Canada	Fourth place
2008 (XXIX)	(China) Beijing	Lori Sippel	Coach	Canada	Fourth place
