= Bowlin Stadium =

Softball stadium in Lincoln, Nebraska

- Interactive map of Bowlin Stadium
- Address: 403 Line Drive Circle
- Location: Lincoln, Nebraska
- Coordinates: 40.8241°N 96.7146°W
- Operator: University of Nebraska–Lincoln
- Capacity: 2,796
- Type: Stadium
- Surface: Kentucky bluegrass
- Record attendance: 3396 (April 24, 2026)
- Field size: Left field: 200 ft (61 m); Center field: 220 ft (67 m); Right field: 195 ft (59 m)

Construction
- Groundbreaking: Apr. 12, 2000
- Opened: Mar. 18, 2002
- Expanded: 2024
- Cost: $29.53 million (includes Hawks Field) ($53.7 million in 2025)
- Architects: Stan Meradith, DLR Group

Tenant
- Nebraska Cornhuskers softball (2002–present)

Bowlin Stadium is a softball stadium in the Haymarket District of Lincoln, Nebraska. It is less than a mile west of the University of Nebraska–Lincoln and is the home venue of the school's softball team. The thirty-two acre Haymarket Park complex, jointly financed by the city of Lincoln and NU, was completed in 2001 at a cost of $29.53 million. Bowlin Stadium is adjacent to the larger Hawks Field, which hosts Nebraska's baseball team.

== History ==
The University of Nebraska–Lincoln announced a new baseball and softball stadium project on July 30, 1999, which was unanimously approved by the University of Nebraska Board of Regents on April 1, 2000. The Omaha-based DLR Group was contracted as the principal designer for the complex. The Haymarket Park complex broke ground on April 12, 2000, just off U.S. Route 6 and Charleston Street west of downtown Lincoln. Construction was completed in mid-June of 2001, though Nebraska did not play its first game at the stadium until March 19, 2002, a 3–1 victory over Creighton.

The city of Lincoln, which maintains ownership of the land and buildings in the Haymarket Park complex, contributed $13.7 million to construction. The University of Nebraska–Lincoln and Lincoln Pro Baseball (LPB) each contributed approximately ten million dollars. NU signed a thirty-five-year lease with no charged property tax or insurance fees.

Bowlin Stadium is named for Ione Bowlin, a state native and former administrator whose estate made a significant donation to the school's athletic department. Bowlin died in 2001; the stadium was dedicated in her honor on April 31, 2002 and she was posthumously awarded the 2002–03 Dr. Barbara Hibner Trailblazing Award in recognition of her support for women's athletics at Nebraska. It has a listed capacity of 2,796 (though the university says it can hold over 3,000), with nearly 1,000 chairback seats in addition to metal bleachers down the first base line and all-grass berms down both foul lines. Nebraska has ranked in the national top ten in attendance five times and hosted five NCAA Regionals since moving to Bowlin Stadium.

=== Playing surface ===
The Haymarket Park complex was the first collegiate venue to use the SubAir heating and cooling system to optimize field temperature year-round. The Kentucky bluegrass playing surface at Bowlin Stadium was named the collegiate softball "Field of the Year" in 2004 by the Sports Field Management Association.
