= Haymarket Park =

Baseball stadium in Lincoln, Nebraska, US

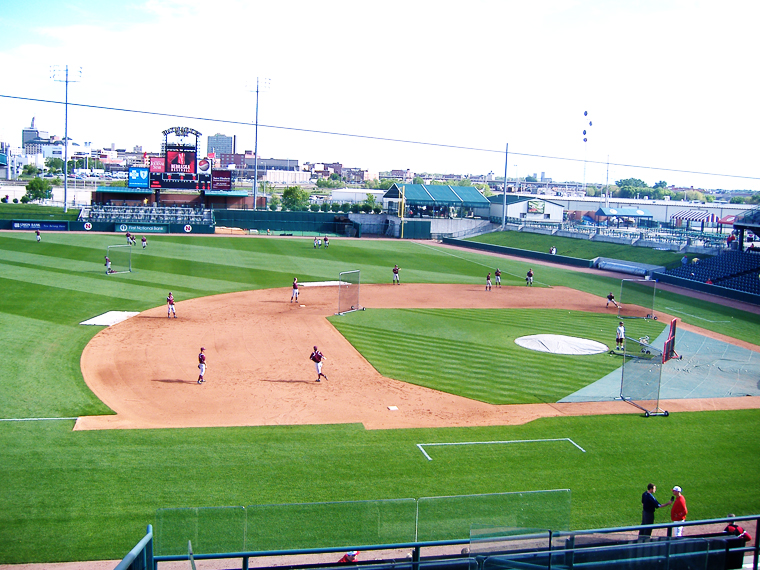

- Location within Nebraska Location within the United States
- Interactive map of Haymarket Park
- Full name: Hawks Field at Haymarket Park
- Address: 403 Line Drive Circle
- Location: Lincoln, Nebraska
- Coordinates: 40.82279°N 96.71391°W
- Operator: University of Nebraska–Lincoln
- Capacity: 8,486
- Type: Stadium
- Surface: Kentucky bluegrass
- Record attendance: 8,757 (April 14, 2006)
- Field size: Left field – 335 ft (102 m); Left-center – 403 ft (123 m); Center field – 395 ft (120 m); Right-center – 400 ft (120 m); Right field – 325 ft (99 m)

Construction
- Groundbreaking: April 12, 2000
- Opened: June 1, 2001
- Cost: $29.53 million (includes Bowlin Stadium) ($53.7 million in 2025)
- Architects: Stan Meradith, DLR Group

Tenants
- Nebraska Cornhuskers (NCAA) 2002–present Lincoln Saltdogs (AA) 2001–present

Website
- Haymarket Park

Hawks Field at Haymarket Park is a baseball stadium in the Haymarket District of Lincoln, Nebraska. It is less than a mile west of the University of Nebraska–Lincoln (NU) and is the home venue of the school's baseball team and the Lincoln Saltdogs of the American Association of Professional Baseball. The thirty-two acre Haymarket Park complex, jointly financed by the city of Lincoln and NU, was completed in 2001 at a cost of $29.53 million ($53.7 million in 2025 dollars). Hawks Field is adjacent to the smaller Bowlin Stadium, which hosts Nebraska's softball team.

== History ==
For over fifty years, Nebraska played its home games at Buck Beltzer Stadium, located just northeast of Memorial Stadium. By the 1990s, the stadium was out-of-date and lacked many of the amenities that had become typical of Division I college baseball stadiums. A new baseball and softball stadium project was announced on July 30, 1999, and unanimously approved by the University of Nebraska Board of Regents on April 1, 2000. The Omaha-based DLR Group was contracted as the principal designer for the complex. Then-NU head coach Dave Van Horn and representatives from the DLR Group toured stadiums throughout the region for inspiration in the design process; the prominent brick and open concourse of Haymarket Park can be seen at venues including Chickasaw Bricktown Ballpark in Oklahoma City and Franklin Covey Field (now Smith's Ballpark) in Salt Lake City. The baseball portion of the facility was oriented such that downtown Lincoln, and especially Memorial Stadium, can be clearly viewed over the outfield walls.

Haymarket Park broke ground on April 12, 2000, just off U.S. Route 6 and Charleston Street west of downtown Lincoln. Construction was completed on June 1, 2001, making the stadium available to host Super Regional games during the 2001 NCAA Division I baseball tournament. However, NU elected to finish the season at Buck Beltzer Stadium, where the Cornhuskers swept Rice to advance to the program's first College World Series. Nebraska played its first game at Hawks Field on March 4 of the following year, a 23–1 victory over Nebraska–Kearney.

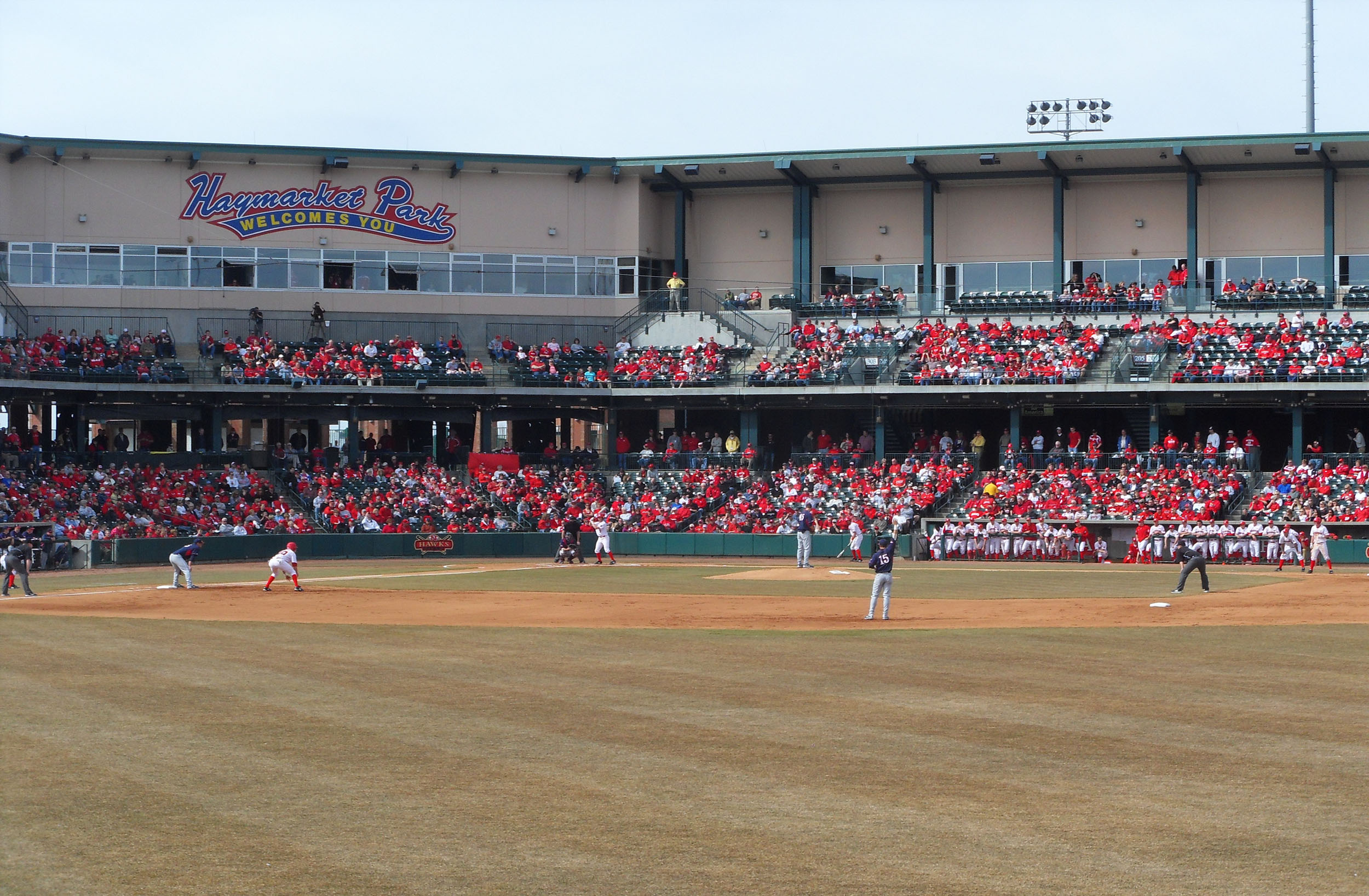
Nebraska vs. Fresno State at Hawks Field at Haymarket Park on March 11, 2011

Hawks Field is named for Myrna Hawks, the wife of prominent Omaha businessman Howard Hawks; the couple were significant donors to the construction of the complex, but Myrna died before the stadium was complete. The Hawks Championship Center football practice facility is also named for the family. Hawks Field has a listed capacity of 8,486, including 4,419 seatback chairs and room for approximately 4,000 additional fans in the grass berms down the left and right field lines. NU ranked fourteenth nationally in total attendance in 2022 and regularly leads the Big Ten Conference in attendance. The highest recorded attendance at Hawks Field was on April 14, 2006, when an overflow crowd of 8,757 watched fourth-ranked Nebraska defeat Texas A&M 4–3.

The city of Lincoln, which maintains ownership of the land and buildings in the Haymarket Park complex, contributed $13.7 million to construction. The University of Nebraska–Lincoln and Lincoln Pro Baseball (LPB) each contributed approximately ten million dollars. NU and LPB signed a thirty-five year lease with no charged property tax or insurance fees and are jointly responsible for facility maintenance. Prior to the completion of Hawks Field, LPB facilitated the purchase of the Madison Black Wolf, a Northern League club from Madison, Wisconsin. The team was moved to Lincoln and renamed the Saltdogs, Lincoln's first professional baseball team in forty years. The Saltdogs played the first game at Hawks Field on June 1, 2001, a 7–6 victory over the Sioux City Explorers. Haymarket Park hosted the Northern League All-Star Game in 2003.

Nebraska's all-time record at Hawks Field is 388–148–1; the Saltdogs are 739–696. The stadium has hosted two NCAA Super Regionals and five NCAA Regionals.

=== Alex Gordon Training Complex ===
Nebraska constructed the $4.75 million Alex Gordon Training Complex in 2011, adjacent to Bowlin Stadium and just northeast of Hawks Field. The facility was named for former NU All-American and Major League Baseball All-Star Alex Gordon, who donated one million dollars to the project.

=== Playing surface ===
Hawks Field was the first collegiate venue to use the SubAir heating and cooling system to optimize field temperature year-round. The Kentucky bluegrass playing surface was named the collegiate "Field of the Year" in 2003 and 2007 by the Sports Field Management Association, making it the award's first two-time winner. The Saltdogs have won their league's "Playing Surface of the Year" in each season of competition (the Northern League from 2001 to 2005 and the American Association of Professional Baseball since).

== Other events ==
Since its opening in 2001, Haymarket Park has served as one of the primary entertainment venues in Lincoln. Notable among those who have performed at the stadium are Willie Nelson (August 31, 2004), Bryan Adams and Def Leppard (August 2, 2005), John Mellencamp (August 8, 2010), and Bob Dylan (two occasions). The stadium has hosted hundreds of charity and fundraiser events, including an annual Relay for Life event sponsored by the American Cancer Society.

== See also ==
- List of NCAA Division I baseball venues

Events and tenants
Preceded by Stade Municipal	Host of the NoL All-Star Game; Haymarket Park; 2003	Succeeded by Silver Cross Field
