= Wendy Saschenbrecker =

Canadian fencer

Wendy Saschenbrecker (born June 24, 1976) is a Taiwanese-born Canadian fencer from Ottawa, Ontario. She was born in Taiwan, and moved to Canada at the age of five.

Saschenbrecker began fencing at the University of Ottawa in 1995. She is a graduate of the University of Ottawa and from McGill University. She works as a manager with the Canada Revenue Agency. In 2006, she won a silver medal at the Pan American Championships.

At the 2008 Summer Olympics she was a member of the Canadian sabre team that finished in seventh place.
