= Chris Begg =

Canadian baseball pitcher

- Pitcher
- Born: September 12, 1979 (age 46); Uxbridge, Ontario, Canada
- Bats: Right Throws: Right
- Stats at Baseball Reference
Medals
Men's baseball
Representing Canada
Baseball World Cup
Bronze medal – third place	2009 Nettuno	Team

Christopher Stephen Begg (born September 12, 1979) is a Canadian former professional baseball pitcher.

== Career ==
A graduate of Niagara University, Begg was signed as an undrafted free agent by the San Francisco Giants in 2003 after pitching for the St. Paul Saints of the Northern League. Begg was also named the 2001 MAAC Pitcher of the Year.

He was promoted to the AAA affiliate of the Giants, the Fresno Grizzlies. In his first start he pitched six innings, giving up one run, en route to the win. Begg last pitched for the Giants organization in 2008.

== International career ==
Begg was selected for Canada national baseball team in the 2004 Summer Olympics, 2006 World Baseball Classic, 2008 Summer Olympics 2009 World Baseball Classic and 2009 Baseball World Cup.
