= Emmanuel Garcia =

Canadian baseball player

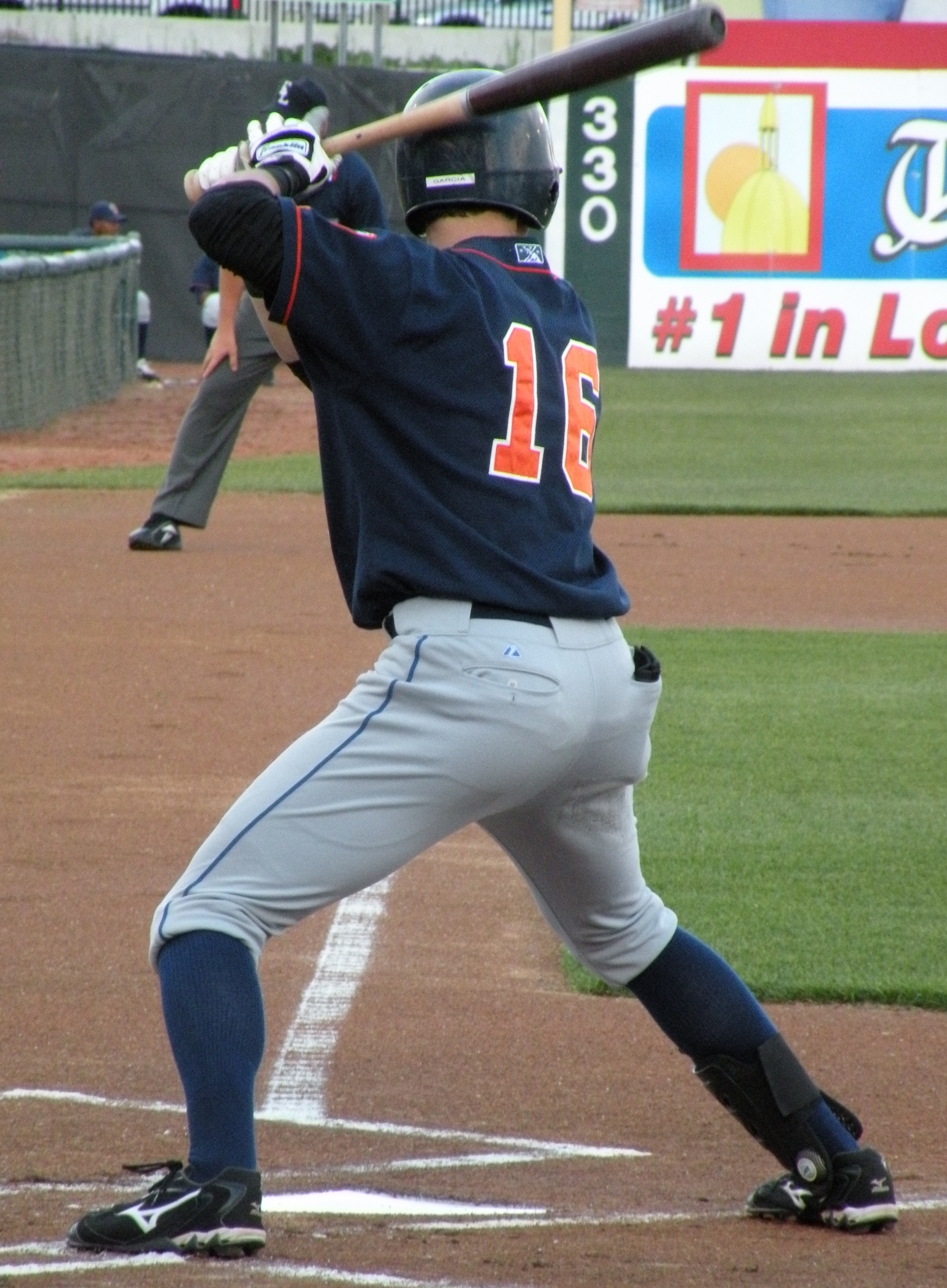
- Garcia in 2009
- Outfielder
- Born: March 4, 1986 (age 39); Montreal, Quebec, Canada
- Batted: Left Threw: Right

debut
- 2005

Last appearance
- 2010

Emmanuel Garcia (born March 4, 1986, in Montreal, Quebec) is a Canadian former baseball player. He played six years in the minor leagues through 2010, and represented Canada at the Baseball World Cup and the Summer Olympics.

== Career ==
Garcia signed as a free agent in September 2004, with the New York Mets . He signed as an infielder. He played in 2005 with the GCL Mets and surprised the league by hitting .339/.412/.409 with 17 steals in 18 tries and 43 runs in 45 games. He led the Gulf Coast League in runs, on-base percentage and hits (63, tied with Eduardo Pérez). He was third in the GCL in average behind Perez and Francisco Guzman, two points ahead of Matt Kutler. He was second to José Tábata in steals. Garcia was the GCL All-Star shortstop. Baseball America named him the #20 prospect in the GCL.

In 2006, Garcia played for the Kingsport Mets (.291/.373/.379, 19 SB in 25 attempts) and the Brooklyn Cyclones (.240/.316/.240 in 13 games). He led Appalachian League shortstops with 167 assists and was third in the Appy League in steals. He made the All-Star team as a utility man. Baseball America rated him the #11 prospect in the league.

The Montréal native batted .256/.339/.301 for the 2007 St. Lucie Mets in his first pro struggles. He stole 37 bases in 47 tries and split time between second base and shortstop. In the 2007 Baseball World Cup, Garcia started at shortstop for Canada ahead of former major leaguer Kevin Nicholson and responded very well by hitting .375/.524/.500. One problem was defense as he made four errors in five games, fielding .867. He spent the rest of the winter with the Waikiki BeachBoys, batting .348/.427/.485 with 8 steals in 9 tries.

Garcia's last year of professional baseball was in 2010 where he split time between the St. Lucie Mets and the Buffalo Bisons.

== Beijing Olympics ==
Garcia played for Canada in the 2008 Final Olympic Qualification Tournament and was their shortstop as they finished first, earning a spot in the 2008 Summer Olympics in Beijing. Garcia struggled at the plate in the field and at the plate in the qualifiers, hitting .240/.321/.240. He scored the winning run in their 10-inning victory over the German national team, reaching via error and coming home on a bases-loaded walk by Emerson Frostad.

Garcia was a late addition to Canada for the 2008 Olympics, replacing Pete Orr after Orr was called up to the majors. He hit .190/.292/.286 as Canada's starting shortstop, fielding .875. He contributed a RBI triple in a 5–4 loss to the Team USA.

== Cancer ==
On June 2, 2010, The New York Mets sent an official letter from Major League Baseball informing Garcia he tested positive for high levels of human chorionic gonadotropin, which is illicitly used after an anabolic steroid cycle to jump-start the body's production of testosterone. Garcia's 50-game suspension would be announced unless he appealed. Garcia was diagnosed with testicular cancer seminoma (also known as pure seminoma or classical seminoma) which caused Garcia's test to be positive. He underwent surgery on June 23, 2010, at Memorial Sloan–Kettering Cancer Center removing his right testicle. Beginning August 15, Garcia underwent daily radiotherapy treatments in Port St. Lucie for 30 days. Garcia is cancer-free as of March 16, 2011.
