= Erin McLean =

Canadian softball player

Personal information
- Born: 9 November 1985 (age 40) Ajax, Ontario, Canada

Sport
- Sport: Softball

Erin McLean (born 9 November 1985) is a Canadian softball player. She competed in the women's tournament at the 2008 Summer Olympics. She played NAIA softball at Simon Fraser.
