= Sheena Lawrick =

Canadian softball player

Personal information
- National team: Canada
- Born: June 22, 1983 (age 43) Calgary, Alberta, Canada

Sport
- Sport: Softball
- University team: Nebraska

Sheena Lawrick (born June 22, 1983) is a Canadian softball infielder. Born in Calgary, Alberta, Lawrick was a Division I NCAA student athlete at the University of Nebraska–Lincoln from 2002 to 2005. She was a part of the Canada women's national softball team that finished fifth at the 2004 Summer Olympics and fourth at the 2008 Summer Olympics.

Lawrick lives in Chicago. She is a nutrition consultant and principal with Beyond the Box Nutrition and a competitive CrossFit athlete.
