= Dione Meier =

Canadian softball player

Personal information
- Born: 3 September 1981 (age 44) Calgary, Alberta, Canada

Sport
- Sport: Softball

Dione Meier (born 3 September 1981) is a Canadian softball player. She competed in the women's tournament at the 2008 Summer Olympics. She spent two years at Galveston College, winning NJCAA All-American honors, before transferring to Nicholls State, where she was named Southland Conference pitcher of the year during her senior season in 2004.
