= Jonathan Lockwood =

Canadian baseball player

- Pitcher
- Born: December 12, 1981 (age 44); Toronto, Ontario, Canada
- Bats: Right Throws: Right
- Stats at Baseball Reference

Jonathan Tomas Lockwood OLY (born December 12, 1981) is a Canadian former professional baseball pitcher. He played in the Seattle Mariners minor league system from 2004 to 2007. Lockwood participated in the 2008 Summer Olympics, as a member of Canada's national baseball team.

== Professional baseball career ==
Lockwood was born in Toronto and attended Humberside Collegiate Institute. He played baseball for Louisiana Tech University and signed with the Seattle Mariners in August 2003.

In 2004, he pitched for both the AZL Mariners and Everett AquaSox, appearing in 12 games in his first professional season. Lockwood saw time with the AquaSox and the Wisconsin Timber Rattlers in 2005, the Inland Empire 66ers in 2006 and the High Desert Mavericks in 2007 before ending his playing career.

== Olympic career ==
While with the Mariners organization, he joined Canada's national baseball team. In November 2005, he combined with relievers Steve Green and Aaron Myette to no-hit Guatemala in a 2008 Summer Olympics qualifier. By 2008, Lockwood was working as an advertising salesman for the Toronto Sun, but returned to Team Canada for the Olympics. On August 14, he recorded a loss against Cuba.

== Medical career ==
Lockwood earned a bachelor of science and medical degree at the University of Toronto and a master of arts at McMaster University. After his baseball career ended, he began practicing medicine with a focus in sports medicine.
