= Sandra Gouverneur =

Dutch softball player (born 1976)

Sandra Gouverneur (born 2 October 1976 in Heerhugowaard, North Holland) is a Dutch softball player, who represents the Dutch national team in international competitions.

Gouverneur played for The Herons, Terrasvogels, Nuoro and, since 2007, for Gryphons. She plays as a shortstop and first baseman, while she bats and throws right-handed. She competes for the Dutch national team since 1995. In 2000 and 2001, she was named MVP in the Dutch Softball Hoofdklasse; in 2005, she was the best batter in the league. She was part of the Dutch team for the 2008 Summer Olympics in Beijing.
