= Melanie Matthews =

Canadian softball player

Personal information
- Nationality: Canadian
- Born: 6 August 1986 (age 39) Vancouver, British Columbia, Canada

Sport
- Sport: Softball

Melanie Matthews (born 6 August 1986) is a Canadian softball player. She competed in the women's tournament at the 2008 Summer Olympics. At the collegiate level she played for Simon Fraser and Stetson.
