= Roberto Ibáñez =

Ecuadorian judoka (born 1985)

Personal information
- Born: January 20, 1985 (age 41)
Medal record
Men's Judo
Representing Ecuador
Pan American Games
Silver medal – second place	2007	Half Lightweight

Roberto Xavier Ibáñez Romero (born January 20, 1985, in Guayaquil, Guayas) is a judoka from Ecuador, who won the silver medal in the men's half lightweight division (– 66 kg) at the 2007 Pan American Games. He represented his native country at the 2008 Summer Olympics.
