= Robin Mackin =

Canadian softball player

Personal information
- Born: 31 August 1987 (age 38) Newmarket, Ontario, Canada

Sport
- Sport: Softball

Robin Mackin (born 31 August 1987) is a Canadian softball player. She competed in the women's tournament at the 2008 Summer Olympics. She played collegiate softball at Fresno State and Nebraska.
