= List of ICF Canoe Sprint World Championships medalists in paracanoe =

This is a list of medalists from the ICF Canoe Sprint World Championships in paracanoe, an event that made its debut in 2010 at Poznań, Poland.

== Men ==
=== KL1 ===
First contested in 2010. Classed as K-1 A before 2015.

Games	Gold	Silver	Bronze
2010 Poznań	Fernando Fernandes de Pádua (BRA)	Antonio De Diego (ESP)	Jono Broome (GBR)
2011 Szeged	Fernando Fernandes de Pádua (BRA)	Alexey Malyshev (RUS)	Antonio De Diego (ESP)
2012 Poznań	Fernando Fernandes de Pádua (BRA)	Jakub Tokarz (POL)	Alexey Malyshev (RUS)
2013 Duisburg	Fernando Fernandes de Pádua (BRA)	Ian Marsden (GBR)	Christian Mathes (GER)
2014 Moscow	András Rozbora (HUN)	Ian Marsden (GBR)	Igor Korobeynikov (RUS)
2015 Milan	Luis Cardoso da Silva (BRA)	Jakub Tokarz (POL)	Fernando Fernandes de Pádua (BRA)
2016 Duisburg	Yu Xiaowei (CHN)	Jakub Tokarz (POL)	Luis Cardoso da Silva (BRA)
2017 Račice	Esteban Farias (ITA)	Róbert Suba (HUN)	Luis Cardoso da Silva (BRA)
2018 Montemor-o-Velho	Esteban Farias (ITA)	Róbert Suba (HUN)	Luis Cardoso da Silva (BRA)
2019 Szeged	Péter Pál Kiss (HUN)	Esteban Farias (ITA)	Luis Cardoso da Silva (BRA)
2021 Copenhagen	Péter Pál Kiss (HUN)	Luis Cardoso da Silva (BRA)	Róbert Suba (HUN)
2022 Dartmouth	Péter Pál Kiss (HUN)	Luis Cardoso da Silva (BRA)	Rémy Boullé (FRA)
2023 Duisburg	Péter Pál Kiss (HUN)	Rémy Boullé (FRA)	Luis Cardoso da Silva (BRA)
2024 Szeged	Luis Cardoso da Silva (BRA)	Rémy Boullé (FRA)	Saeid Hosseinpour (IRI)
2025 Milan	Péter Pál Kiss (HUN)	Luis Cardoso da Silva (BRA)	Aleksandr Ilichev (AIN)
2026 Poznań	Péter Pál Kiss (HUN)	Luis Cardoso da Silva (BRA)	Aleksandr Ilichev (AIN)

=== KL2 ===
First contested in 2010. Classed as K-1 TA before 2015.

Games	Gold	Silver	Bronze
2010 Poznań	Markus Swoboda (AUT)	Paolo Bressi (ITA)	Henry Manni (FIN)
2011 Szeged	Markus Swoboda (AUT)	Tomasz Moździerski (POL)	Bence Pál (HUN)
2012 Poznań	Markus Swoboda (AUT)	Tomasz Moździerski (POL)	János Bencze (HUN)
2013 Duisburg	Markus Swoboda (AUT)	Victor Potanin (RUS)	Pier Alberto Buccoliero (ITA)
2014 Moscow	Markus Swoboda (AUT)	Fernando Rufino (BRA)	Victor Potanin (RUS)
2015 Milan	Markus Swoboda (AUT)	Curtis McGrath (AUS)	Fernando Rufino (BRA)
2016 Duisburg	Curtis McGrath (AUS)	Markus Swoboda (AUT)	Nick Beighton (GBR)
2017 Račice	Curtis McGrath (AUS)	Markus Swoboda (AUT)	Mykola Syniuk (UKR)
2018 Montemor-o-Velho	Curtis McGrath (AUS)	Scott Martlew (NZL)	Mykola Syniuk (UKR)
2019 Szeged	Curtis McGrath (AUS)	Federico Mancarella (ITA)	Scott Martlew (NZL)
2021 Copenhagen	Mykola Syniuk (UKR)	Federico Mancarella (ITA)	Markus Swoboda (AUT)
2022 Dartmouth	Mykola Syniuk (UKR)	David Phillipson (GBR)	Scott Martlew (NZL)
2023 Duisburg	Curtis McGrath (AUS)	Mykola Syniuk (UKR)	Federico Mancarella (ITA)
2024 Szeged	Curtis McGrath (AUS)	David Phillipson (GBR)	Fernando Rufino (BRA)
2025 Milan	David Phillipson (GBR)	Christian Volpi (ITA)	Oybek Yuldashev (UZB)
2026 Poznań	Curtis McGrath (AUS)	Fernando Rufino (BRA)	Azizbek Abdulkhabibov (UZB)

=== KL3 ===
First contested in 2010. Classed as K-1 LTA before 2015.

Games	Gold	Silver	Bronze
2010 Poznań	Iulian Șerban (ROU)	Martin Farineaux (FRA)	Andrea Testa (ITA)
2011 Szeged	Iulian Șerban (ROU)	Andrea Testa (ITA)	Mateusz Surwiło (POL)
2012 Poznań	Iulian Șerban (ROU)	Mateusz Surwiło (POL)	Andrea Testa (ITA)
2013 Duisburg	Tom Kierey (GER)	Iulian Șerban (ROU)	Yuriy Kikhayev (UKR)
2014 Moscow	Yuriy Kikhayev (UKR)	Iulian Șerban (ROU)	Leonid Krylov (RUS)
2015 Milan	Tom Kierey (GER)	Robert Oliver (GBR)	Leonid Krylov (RUS)
2016 Duisburg	Tom Kierey (GER)	Serhii Yemelianov (UKR)	Leonid Krylov (RUS)
2017 Račice	Serhii Yemelianov (UKR)	Caio Ribeiro de Carvalho (BRA)	Jonathan Young (GBR)
2018 Montemor-o-Velho	Serhii Yemelianov (UKR)	Caio Ribeiro de Carvalho (BRA)	Leonid Krylov (RUS)
2019 Szeged	Serhii Yemelianov (UKR)	Leonid Krylov (RUS)	Caio Ribeiro de Carvalho (BRA)
2021 Copenhagen	Serhii Yemelianov (UKR)	Robert Oliver (GBR)	Juan Valle (ESP)
2022 Dartmouth	Juan Valle (ESP)	Robert Oliver (GBR)	Dylan Littlehales (AUS)
2023 Duisburg	Dylan Littlehales (AUS)	Jonathan Young (GBR)	Brahim Guendouz (ALG)
2024 Szeged	Juan Valle (ESP)	Dylan Littlehales (AUS)	Miquéias Elias Rodrigues (BRA)
2025 Milan	Serhii Yemelianov (GEO)	Miquéias Elias Rodrigues (BRA)	Dylan Littlehales (AUS)
2026 Poznań	Serhii Yemelianov (GEO)	Gabriel Paixao Porto (BRA)	Miquéias Elias Rodrigues (BRA)

=== VL1 ===
Was part of the VL3 category in 2010 and VL2 category in 2011. Contested separately thereafter and classed as V-1 A before 2015.

Games	Gold	Silver	Bronze
2012 Poznań	Daniel Hopwood (GBR)	Luis Cardoso da Silva (BRA)	Jakub Tokarz (POL)
2013 Duisburg	Oleksandr Hrechko (UKR)	Jakub Tokarz (POL)	Daniel Hopwood (GBR)
2014 Moscow	Luis Cardoso da Silva (BRA)	Oleksandr Hrechko (UKR)	Róbert Suba (HUN)
2015 Milan	Luis Cardoso da Silva (BRA)	Jakub Tokarz (POL)	Róbert Suba (HUN)
2016 Duisburg	Luis Cardoso da Silva (BRA)	Róbert Suba (HUN)	Jakub Tokarz (POL)
2017 Račice	Luis Cardoso da Silva (BRA)	Róbert Suba (HUN)	Pavel Gromov (RUS)
2018 Montemor-o-Velho	Peter Happ (GER)	Robinson Méndez (CHI)	None awarded
2019 Szeged	Mykola Fedorenko (UKR)	Peter Happ (GER)	Robinson Méndez (CHI)
2021 Copenhagen	Artur Chuprov (RCF)	Robinson Méndez (CHI)	Alessio Bedin (ITA)
2022 Dartmouth	Benjamin Sainsbury (AUS)	Alessio Bedin (ITA)	Robinson Méndez (CHI)
2023 Duisburg	Benjamin Sainsbury (AUS)	David González (ESP)	Carlos Glenndel Moreira (BRA)
2024 Szeged	David González (ESP)	Carlos Glenndel Moreira (BRA)	Yuta Takagi (JPN)
2025 Milan	Ilya Taupianets (AIN)	Benjamin Sainsbury (AUS)	Artur Chuprov (AIN)
2026 Poznań	Benjamin Sainsbury (AUS)	Ilya Taupianets (AIN)	Artur Chuprov (AIN)

=== VL2 ===
Was part of the VL3 category in 2010, then contested as combined category (V-1 A/TA) in 2011. Contested separately thereafter and classed as V-1 TA before 2015.

Games	Gold	Silver	Bronze
2011 Szeged	Sándor Szabó (HUN)	Robert Balk (USA)	Daniel Hopwood (GBR)
2012 Poznań	Nicholas Heald (GBR)	Ronan Bernard (FRA)	Dave Waters (CAN)
2013 Duisburg	Javier Reja Muñoz (ESP)	Nicholas Heald (GBR)	Tomasz Moździerski (POL)
2014 Moscow	Curtis McGrath (AUS)	Jonathan Young (GBR)	Victor Potanin (RUS)
2015 Milan	Curtis McGrath (AUS)	Javier Reja Muñoz (ESP)	Ivo Kilian (GER)
2016 Duisburg	Curtis McGrath (AUS)	Javier Reja Muñoz (ESP)	Giuseppe de Lelio (ITA)
2017 Račice	Curtis McGrath (AUS)	Markus Swoboda (AUT)	Javier Reja Muñoz (ESP)
2018 Montemor-o-Velho	Igor Alex Tofalini (BRA)	Luis Cardoso da Silva (BRA)	Marius Bogdan Ciustea (ITA)
2019 Szeged	Luis Cardoso da Silva (BRA)	Norberto Mourão (POR)	Jakub Tokarz (POL)
2021 Copenhagen	Fernando Rufino (BRA)	Higinio Rivero (ESP)	Norberto Mourão (POR)
2022 Dartmouth	Igor Tofalini (BRA)	Fernando Rufino (BRA)	Norberto Mourão (POR)
2023 Duisburg	Fernando Rufino (BRA)	Igor Tofalini (BRA)	Steven Haxton (USA)
2024 Szeged	Fernando Rufino (BRA)	Igor Tofalini (BRA)	Steven Haxton (USA)
2025 Milan	Fernando Rufino (BRA)	Igor Tofalini (BRA)	Edward Clifton (GBR)
2026 Poznań	Steven Haxton (USA)	Fernando Rufino (BRA)	Igor Tofalini (BRA)

=== VL3 ===
First contested as combined category (V-1 A/TA/LTA) in 2010. Contested separately thereafter and classed as V-1 LTA before 2015.

Games	Gold	Silver	Bronze
2010 Poznań	Patrick Viriamu (TAH)	Gerhard Bowitzky (GER)	George Thomas (NZL)
2011 Szeged	Patrick Mahoney (GBR)	George Thomas (NZL)	Gerhard Bowitzky (GER)
2012 Poznań	Gerhard Bowitzky (GER)	Patrick Viriamu (TAH)	Patrick Mahoney (GBR)
2013 Duisburg	Caio Ribeiro de Carvalho (BRA)	Patrick Viriamu (TAH)	Mirosław Rosiński (POL)
2014 Moscow	Pier Alberto Buccoliero (ITA)	Martin Tweedie (GBR)	Aleksei Egorov (RUS)
2015 Milan	Caio Ribeiro de Carvalho (BRA)	Jonathan Young (GBR)	Daniel Geri (HUN)
2016 Duisburg	Pier Alberto Buccoliero (ITA)	Aleksei Egorov (RUS)	Martin Tweedie (GBR)
2017 Račice	Jonathan Young (GBR)	Caio Ribeiro de Carvalho (BRA)	Martin Tweedie (GBR)
2018 Montemor-o-Velho	Curtis McGrath (AUS)	Caio Ribeiro de Carvalho (BRA)	Jack Eyers (GBR)
2019 Szeged	Curtis McGrath (AUS)	Caio Ribeiro de Carvalho (BRA)	Stuart Wood (GBR)
2021 Copenhagen	Jack Eyers (GBR)	Stuart Wood (GBR)	Vladyslav Yepifanov (UKR)
2022 Dartmouth	Jack Eyers (GBR)	Vladyslav Yepifanov (UKR)	Khaytmurot Sherkuziev (UZB)
2023 Duisburg	Vladyslav Yepifanov (UKR)	Jack Eyers (GBR)	Curtis McGrath (AUS)
2024 Szeged	Vladyslav Yepifanov (UKR)	Peter Cowan (NZL)	Curtis McGrath (AUS)
2025 Milan	Pu Yi (CHN)	Turabek Nazarkulov (UZB)	Giovane Vieira de Paula (BRA)
2026 Poznań	Pu Yi (CHN)	Vladyslav Yepifanov (UKR)	Stuart Wood (GBR)

== Women ==
=== KL1 ===
Was part of the KL2 category in 2010 and 2011. Contested separately thereafter and classed as K-1 A before 2015.

Games	Gold	Silver	Bronze
2012 Poznań	Jeanette Chippington (GBR)	Marie Brtova (CZE)	Kara Kennedy (AUS)
2013 Duisburg	Jeanette Chippington (GBR)	Svitlana Kupriianova (UKR)	Alexandra Dupik (RUS)
2014 Moscow	Jeanette Chippington (GBR)	Svitlana Kupriianova (UKR)	Alexandra Dupik (RUS)
2015 Milan	Jeanette Chippington (GBR)	Edina Müller (GER)	Svitlana Kupriianova (UKR)
2016 Duisburg	Edina Müller (GER)	Jeanette Chippington (GBR)	Alexandra Dupik (RUS)
2017 Račice	Jeanette Chippington (GBR)	Alexandra Dupik (RUS)	Katherinne Wollermann (CHI)
2018 Montemor-o-Velho	Maryna Mazhula (UKR)	Eleonora de Paolis (ITA)	Jeanette Chippington (GBR)
2019 Szeged	Maryna Mazhula (UKR)	Edina Müller (GER)	Katherinne Wollermann (CHI)
2021 Copenhagen	Maryna Mazhula (UKR)	Edina Müller (GER)	Katherinne Wollermann (CHI)
2022 Dartmouth	Maryna Mazhula (UKR)	Katherinne Wollermann (CHI)	Brianna Hennessy (CAN)
2023 Duisburg	Maryna Mazhula (UKR)	Katherinne Wollermann (CHI)	Brianna Hennessy (CAN)
2024 Szeged	Katherinne Wollermann (CHI)	Maryna Mazhula (UKR)	Edina Müller (GER)
2025 Milan	Katherinne Wollermann (CHI)	Maryna Mazhula (UKR)	Xie Maosan (CHN)
2026 Poznań	Katherinne Wollermann (CHI)	Xie Maosan (CHN)	Brianna Hennessy (CAN)

=== KL2 ===
First contested as combined category (K-1 A/TA) in 2010. Contested separately from 2012 and classed as K-1 TA before 2015.

Games	Gold	Silver	Bronze
2010 Poznań	Marta Santos Ferreira (BRA)	Christine Selinger (CAN)	Séverine Amiot (FRA)
2011 Szeged	Marta Santos Ferreira (BRA)	Christine Selinger (CAN)	Anna Pani (ITA)
2012 Poznań	Jeanette Chippington (GBR)	Marta Santos Ferreira (BRA)	Christine Selinger (CAN)
2013 Duisburg	Emma Wiggs (GBR)	Megan Blunk (USA)	Nataliia Lagutenko (UKR)
2014 Moscow	Emma Wiggs (GBR)	Christine Gauthier (CAN)	Nataliia Lagutenko (UKR)
2015 Milan	Emma Wiggs (GBR)	Nicola Paterson (GBR)	Susan Seipel (AUS)
2016 Duisburg	Emma Wiggs (GBR)	Nicola Paterson (GBR)	Susan Seipel (AUS)
2017 Račice	Emma Wiggs (GBR)	Nicola Paterson (GBR)	Nadezda Andreeva (RUS)
2018 Montemor-o-Velho	Charlotte Henshaw (GBR)	Emma Wiggs (GBR)	Nadezda Andreeva (RUS)
2019 Szeged	Charlotte Henshaw (GBR)	Emma Wiggs (GBR)	Susan Seipel (AUS)
2021 Copenhagen	Charlotte Henshaw (GBR)	Emma Wiggs (GBR)	Katalin Varga (HUN)
2022 Dartmouth	Charlotte Henshaw (GBR)	Emma Wiggs (GBR)	Katalin Varga (HUN)
2023 Duisburg	Charlotte Henshaw (GBR)	Emma Wiggs (GBR)	Katalin Varga (HUN)
2024 Szeged	Charlotte Henshaw (GBR)	Katalin Varga (HUN)	Anja Adler (GER)
2025 Milan	Charlotte Henshaw (GBR)	Katalin Varga (HUN)	Anja Adler (GER)
2026 Poznań	Charlotte Henshaw (GBR)	Katalin Varga (HUN)	Anja Adler (GER)

=== KL3 ===
First contested in 2010. Classed as K-1 LTA before 2015.

Games	Gold	Silver	Bronze
2010 Poznań	Christine Gauthier (CAN)	Marta Santos Ferreira (BRA)	Giovanna Chiriu (ITA)
2011 Szeged	Christine Gauthier (CAN)	Silvia Elvira (ESP)	Marta Santos Ferreira (BRA)
2012 Poznań	Christine Gauthier (CAN)	Silvia Elvira (ESP)	Mihaela Lulea (ROU)
2013 Duisburg	Christine Gauthier (CAN)	Anne Dickins (GBR)	Cindy Moreau (FRA)
2014 Moscow	Anne Dickins (GBR)	Cindy Moreau (FRA)	Amanda Reynolds (AUS)
2015 Milan	Amanda Reynolds (AUS)	Anne Dickins (GBR)	Cindy Moreau (FRA)
2016 Duisburg	Anne Dickins (GBR)	Amanda Reynolds (AUS)	Mihaela Lulea (ROU)
2017 Račice	Amanda Reynolds (AUS)	Shakhnoza Mirzaeva (UZB)	Mihaela Lulea (ROU)
2018 Montemor-o-Velho	Helene Ripa (SWE)	Amanda Reynolds (AUS)	Mihaela Lulea (ROU)
2019 Szeged	Shakhnoza Mirzaeva (UZB)	Laura Sugar (GBR)	Shahla Behrouzirad (IRI)
2021 Copenhagen	Laura Sugar (GBR)	Hope Gordon (GBR)	Nélia Barbosa (FRA)
2022 Dartmouth	Laura Sugar (GBR)	Nélia Barbosa (FRA)	Felicia Laberer (GER)
2023 Duisburg	Laura Sugar (GBR)	Nélia Barbosa (FRA)	Felicia Laberer (GER)
2024 Szeged	Laura Sugar (GBR)	Hope Gordon (GBR)	Nélia Barbosa (FRA)
2025 Milan	Laura Sugar (GBR)	Nélia Barbosa (FRA)	Hope Gordon (GBR); Felicia Laberer (GER)
2026 Poznań	Hope Gordon (GBR)	Nélia Barbosa (FRA)	Felicia Laberer (GER)

=== VL1 ===
Was part of the VL3 category in 2010 and 2011, then the VL2 category in 2012. Contested separately thereafter and classed as V-1 A before 2015.

Games	Gold	Silver	Bronze
2013 Duisburg	Jeanette Chippington (GBR)	Kara Kennedy (AUS)	Ann Yoshida (USA)
2014 Moscow	Jeanette Chippington (GBR)	Kara Kennedy (AUS)	Zoia Ovsii (UKR)
2015 Milan	Katarzyna Leskiewicz (POL)	Ann Yoshida (USA)	None awarded
2016 Duisburg	Ann Yoshida (USA)	Akiko Nakajima (JPN)	Monika Seryu (JPN)
2017 Račice	Jocelyn Neumueller (AUS)	Akiko Nakajima (JPN)	Monika Seryu (JPN)
2018 Montemor-o-Velho	Monika Seryu (JPN)	None awarded	
2019 Szeged	Monika Seryu (JPN)	Esther Bode (GER)	None awarded
2021 Copenhagen	Lillemor Köper (GER)	Esther Bode (GER)	Céline Brulais (FRA)
2022 Dartmouth	Lillemor Köper (GER)	Pooja Ojha (IND)	Esther Bode (GER)
2023 Duisburg	Viktoryia Pistis Shablova (ITA)	Pooja Ojha (IND)	Jocelyn Muñoz (CHI)
2024 Szeged	Viktoryia Pistis Shablova (ITA)	Pooja Ojha (IND)	Jocelyn Muñoz (CHI)
2025 Milan	Chinette Karina Lauridsen (GER)	Viktoryia Shablova (ITA)	Monika Seryu (JPN)
2026 Poznań	Aleksandra Dupik (AIN)	Viktoryia Shablova (ITA)	Monika Seryu (JPN)

=== VL2 ===
Was part of the VL3 category in 2010 and 2011, then contested as combined category (V-1 A/TA) in 2012. Contested separately thereafter and classed as V-1 TA before 2015.

Games	Gold	Silver	Bronze
2012 Poznań	Jeanette Chippington (GBR)	Christine Selinger (CAN)	Kara Kennedy (AUS)
2013 Duisburg	Jeanette Chippington (GBR)	Megan Blunk (USA)	Tamara Oliveira da Silva (BRA)
2014 Moscow	Emma Wiggs (GBR)	Christine Gauthier (CAN)	Nataliia Lagutenko (UKR)
2015 Milan	Susan Seipel (AUS)	Nadezda Andreeva (RUS)	Débora Benivides (BRA)
2016 Duisburg	Susan Seipel (AUS)	Débora Benivides (BRA)	Nadezda Andreeva (RUS)
2017 Račice	Susan Seipel (AUS)	Maria Nikiforova (RUS)	Nataliia Lagutenko (UKR)
2018 Montemor-o-Velho	Emma Wiggs (GBR)	Jeanette Chippington (GBR)	Maria Nikiforova (RUS)
2019 Szeged	Emma Wiggs (GBR)	Susan Seipel (AUS)	Maria Nikiforova (RUS)
2021 Copenhagen	Emma Wiggs (GBR)	Maria Nikiforova (RCF)	Débora Benevides (BRA)
2022 Dartmouth	Emma Wiggs (GBR)	Brianna Hennessy (CAN)	Jeanette Chippington (GBR)
2023 Duisburg	Emma Wiggs (GBR)	Brianna Hennessy (CAN)	Susan Seipel (AUS)
2024 Szeged	Emma Wiggs (GBR)	Brianna Hennessy (CAN)	Susan Seipel (AUS)
2025 Milan	Anastasia Miasnikova (AIN)	Brianna Hennessy (CAN)	Jeanette Chippington (GBR)
2026 Poznań	Emma Wiggs (GBR)	Brianna Hennessy (CAN)	Anastasia Miasnikova (AIN)

=== VL3 ===
First contested as combined category (V-1 A/TA/LTA) in 2010. Contested separately from 2012 and classed as V-1 LTA before 2015.

Games	Gold	Silver	Bronze
2010 Poznań	Christine Selinger (CAN)	Tami Hetke (USA)	Loretta Bellto (ITA)
2011 Szeged	Christine Selinger (CAN)	Brit Gottschalk (GER)	Tami Hetke (USA)
2012 Poznań	Jeanette Chippington (GBR)	Anja Pierce (USA)	Christine Selinger (CAN)
2013 Duisburg	Andrea Green (GBR)	Christine Gauthier (CAN)	Anja Pierce (USA)
2014 Moscow	Andrea Green (GBR)	Larisa Volik (RUS)	Christine Gauthier (CAN)
2015 Milan	Anja Pierce (USA)	Frances Bateman (GBR)	Aline Souza Lopes (BRA)
2016 Duisburg	Aline Souza Lopes (BRA)	Larisa Volik (RUS)	Anja Pierce (USA)
2017 Račice	Larisa Volik (RUS)	Anja Adler (GER)	Lindsay Thorpe (GBR)
2018 Montemor-o-Velho	Larisa Volik (RUS)	Nataliia Lagutenko (UKR)	Charlotte Henshaw (GBR)
2019 Szeged	Charlotte Henshaw (GBR)	Larisa Volik (RUS)	Nataliia Lagutenko (UKR)
2021 Copenhagen	Charlotte Henshaw (GBR)	Hope Gordon (GBR)	Nataliia Lagutenko (UKR)
2022 Dartmouth	Charlotte Henshaw (GBR)	Hope Gordon (GBR)	Mari Santilli (BRA)
2023 Duisburg	Hope Gordon (GBR)	Erica Scarff (CAN)	Mari Santilli (BRA)
2024 Szeged	Charlotte Henshaw (GBR)	Hope Gordon (GBR)	Shakhzoda Mamadalieva (UZB)
2025 Milan	Hope Gordon (GBR)	Charlotte Henshaw (GBR)	Cai Yuqingyan (CHN)
2026 Poznań	Hope Gordon (GBR)	Zhong Yongyuan (CHN)	Shakhzoda Mamadalieva (UZB)
