= 2012 ICF Paracanoe World Championships =

International canoe competition

- Location: Poznań, Poland
- Start date: 16 May
- End date: 17 May

The 2012 ICF Paracanoe World Championships were held on 16 and 17 May 2012 in Poznań, Poland as a standalone event since the ICF Canoe Sprint World Championships are not held in Olympic years.

== Explanation of events ==
Paracanoe competitions are contested in either a va'a (V), an outrigger canoe (which includes a second pontoon) with a single-blade paddle, or in a kayak (K), a closed canoe with a double-bladed paddle. All international competitions are held over 200 metres in single-man boats, with three event classes in both types of vessel for men and women depending on the level of an athlete's impairment; these being A (use of arms only), TA (use of trunk and arms), and LTA (use of legs, trunk, and arms).

== Medal summary ==
=== Medal table ===
* Host nation (Poland)

Rank	Nation	Gold	Silver	Bronze	Total
1	Great Britain	6	0	1	7
2	Brazil	1	2	0	3
3	Canada	1	1	3	5
4	Romania	1	0	1	2
5	Austria	1	0	0	1
5	Germany	1	0	0	1
7	Poland*	0	3	1	4
8	Czech Republic	0	1	0	1
8	France	0	1	0	1
8	French Polynesia	0	1	0	1
8	Spain	0	1	0	1
8	United States	0	1	0	1
13	Australia	0	0	2	2
14	Hungary	0	0	1	1
14	Italy	0	0	1	1
14	Russia	0	0	1	1
17	Ukraine	0	0	0	0
Totals (17 entries)		11	11	11	33

=== Medal events ===
Event	Gold		Silver		Bronze	
Men's K–1 A	Fernando Fernandes de Pádua; Brazil	53.550	Jakub Tokarz; Poland	58.882	Alexey Malyshev; Russia	1:01.250
Men's K–1 TA	Markus Swoboda; Austria	44.614	Tomasz Mozdzerski; Poland	49.938	János Bencze; Hungary	52.934
Men's K–1 LTA	Iulian Șerban; Romania	43.259	Mateusz Surwiło; Poland	44.299	Andrea Testa; Italy	44.695
Men's V–1 A	Daniel Hopwood; Great Britain	1:13.143	Luis Cardoso da Silva; Brazil	1:18.267	Jakub Tokarz; Poland	1:28.731
Men's V–1 TA	Nicholas Heald; Great Britain	59.024	Ronan Bernard; France	1:01.500	Dave Waters; Canada	1:02.432
Men's V–1 LTA	Gerhard Browitzky; Germany	54.749	Patrick Viriamu; French Polynesia	55.469	Patrick Mahoney; Great Britain	59.593
Women's K–1 A	Jeanette Chippington; Great Britain	1:05.684	Marie Bártová; Czech Republic	1:07.112	Kara Kennedy; Australia	1:12.024
Women's K–1 TA	Jeanette Chippington; Great Britain	1:04.693	Maria Dos Santos; Brazil	1:05.489	Christine Selinger; Canada	1:09.921
Women's K–1 LTA	Christine Gauthier; Canada	57.775	Silvia Elvira; Spain	1:01.191	Mihaela Lulea; Romania	1:03.071
Women's V–1 A/TA	Jeanette Chippington; Great Britain	1:08.655	Christine Selinger; Canada	1:15.419	Kara Kennedy; Australia	1:29.711
Women's V–1 LTA	Jeanette Chippington; Great Britain	1:08.028	Anja Pierce; United States	1:10.828	Christine Selinger; Canada	1:14.236
