= 2013 ICF Canoe Sprint World Championships =

Canoe racing event in Duisburg, Germany

- Location: Duisburg, Germany
- Start date: 29 August
- End date: 1 September
- Competitors: 956 from 78 nations

The 2013 ICF Canoe Sprint World Championships was held 29 August–1 September 2013 in Duisburg, Germany. The championships were awarded originally to Szeged, Hungary, but Szeged was moved to 2011 in the wake of Vichy, France's withdrawal in 2010 and awarded to Rio de Janeiro, who withdrew in September 2012. Consequently, the World Championships were awarded to Duisburg.

The 2012 ICF Paracanoe World Championships were held the previous year as a standalone event but the 2012 ICF Canoe Sprint World Championships were not since the competition is not held in Olympic years.

== Explanation of events ==
Canoe sprint competitions are broken up into Canadian canoe (C), an open canoe with a single-blade paddle, or in kayaks (K), a closed canoe with a double-bladed paddle. Each canoe or kayak can hold one person (1), two people (2), or four people (4). For each of the specific canoes or kayaks, such as a K-1 (kayak single), the competition distances can be 200 metres (660 ft), 500 metres (1,600 ft), or 1,000 metres (3,300 ft) long. When a competition is listed as a C-2 500 m event as an example, it means two people are in a canoe competing at a 500 metres (1,600 ft) distance.

== Participating nations ==
Athletes from 76 countries participated in the championships.

- Angola (3)
- Argentina (13)
- Armenia (3)
- Australia (22)
- Austria (4)
- Azerbaijan (7)
- Belarus (21)
- Belgium (6)
- Brazil (16)
- Bulgaria (8)
- Canada (30)
- Chile (9)
- China (12)
- Chinese Taipei (6)
- Cook Islands (1)
- Cuba (5)
- Cyprus (1)
- Czech Republic (29)
- Denmark (11)
- Ecuador (3)
- Estonia (2)
- Finland (6)
- France (22)
- Georgia (4)
- Germany (34)
- Great Britain (23)
- Greece (1)
- Hong Kong (1)
- Hungary (37)
- India (10)
- Indonesia (11)
- Iran (2)
- Iraq (5)
- Ireland (5)
- Italy (25)
- Japan (14)
- Kazakhstan (11)
- Kenya (1)
- Kyrgyzstan (3)
- Latvia (18)
- Lithuania (11)
- Macedonia (2)
- Malaysia (2)
- Mexico (17)
- Moldova (4)
- Montenegro (1)
- Morocco (1)
- Netherlands (2)
- New Zealand (9)
- Norway (4)
- Poland (32)
- Portugal (7)
- Puerto Rico (1)
- Romania (18)
- Russia (40)
- São Tomé and Príncipe (1)
- Senegal (3)
- Serbia (19)
- Singapore (2)
- Slovakia (15)
- Slovenia (3)
- South Africa (5)
- South Korea (11)
- Spain (31)
- Sweden (10)
- Switzerland (1)
- Tahiti (1)
- Tajikistan (2)
- Trinidad & Tobago (1)
- Tunisia (1)
- Turkey (1)
- Ukraine (32)
- United States (15)
- Uzbekistan (4)
- Venezuela (6)
- Vietnam (1)

== Medal summary ==
=== Medal tables ===
==== Canoe ====
Rank	Nation	Gold	Silver	Bronze	Total
1	Germany	8	6	2	16
2	Hungary	7	5	5	17
3	Russia	4	4	1	9
4	Canada	2	1	2	5
5	New Zealand	2	0	1	3
6	Poland	1	3	2	6
7	Australia	1	1	1	3
8	Brazil	1	0	1	2
9	Azerbaijan	1	0	0	1
9	Portugal	1	0	0	1
9	Sweden	1	0	0	1
12	Belarus	0	3	2	5
13	Czech Republic	0	1	2	3
14	Great Britain	0	1	1	2
15	Argentina	0	1	0	1
15	Bulgaria	0	1	0	1
15	Denmark	0	1	0	1
15	Uzbekistan	0	1	0	1
19	France	0	0	2	2
19	Spain	0	0	2	2
21	Chile	0	0	1	1
21	Finland	0	0	1	1
21	Romania	0	0	1	1
21	Serbia	0	0	1	1
21	Slovenia	0	0	1	1
Totals (25 entries)		29	29	29	87

==== Paracanoe ====
Rank	Nation	Gold	Silver	Bronze	Total
1	Great Britain	5	3	1	9
2	Brazil	2	0	1	3
3	Ukraine	1	1	2	4
4	Canada	1	1	0	2
5	Germany	1	0	1	2
6	Austria	1	0	0	1
6	Spain	1	0	0	1
8	United States	0	2	2	4
9	Poland	0	1	2	3
10	Russia	0	1	1	2
11	Australia	0	1	0	1
11	French Polynesia	0	1	0	1
11	Romania	0	1	0	1
14	France	0	0	1	1
14	Italy	0	0	1	1
Totals (15 entries)		12	12	12	36

=== Men ===
Non-Olympic classes

==== Canoe ====
Event	Gold		Silver		Bronze	
C–1 200 m	Valentin Demyanenko (AZE)	38.462	Ivan Shtyl (RUS)	38.717	Alfonso Benavides (ESP)	39.060
C–1 500 m	Isaquias Queiroz (BRA)	1:50.940	Vadim Menkov (UZB)	1:51.939	Erik Leue (GER)	1:53.032
C–1 1000 m	Attila Vajda (HUN)	4:09.123	Sebastian Brendel (GER)	4:10.365	Isaquias Queiroz (BRA)	4:14.154
C–1 5000 m	Sebastian Brendel (GER)	22:17.864	Attila Vajda (HUN)	22:24.149	Mark Oldershaw (CAN)	22:44.535
C–2 200 m m	Germany; Robert Nuck; Stefan Holtz	36.331	Russia; Alexander Kovalenko; Nikolay Lipkin	36.551	Belarus; Dzmitry Rabchanka; Aleksandr Vauchetskiy	36.654
C–2 500 m	Russia; Viktor Melantyev; Ivan Shtyl	1:44.285	Hungary; Henrik Vasbányai; Róbert Mike	1:44.575	Czech Republic; Jaroslav Radoň; Filip Dvořák	1:45.082
C–2 1000 m	Hungary; Henrik Vasbányai; Róbert Mike	3:52.602	Russia; Viktor Melantyev; Ilya Pervukhin	3:53.934	Czech Republic; Jaroslav Radoň; Filip Dvořák	3:54.788
C–4 1000 m	Germany; Kurt Kuschela; Erik Leue; Erik Rebstock; Peter Kretschmer	3:28.502	Belarus; Dzmitry Rabchanka; Dzmitry Vaitsishkin; Dzianis Harazha; Aleksandr Vauchetskiy	3:29.297	Hungary; Dávid Korisánszky; Péter Korisánszky; András Vass; Dávid Varga	3:30.568
C–1 200 m Relay	Russia; Andrey Kraitor; Viktor Melantev; Andrey Ganin; Ivan Shtyl	2:48.255	Germany; Robert Nuck; Stefan Holtz; Stefan Kiraj; Sebastian Brendel	2:50.205	Canada; Jason McCoombs; Mark Oldershaw; Gabriel Beauchesne-Sévigny; Benjamin Russel	2:51.579

==== Kayak ====
Event	Gold		Silver		Bronze	
K–1 200 m	Petter Öström (SWE)	34.644	Mark de Jonge (CAN)	34.674	Saúl Craviotto (ESP)	34.896
K–1 500 m	Tom Liebscher (GER)	1:40.514	René Holten Poulsen (DEN)	1:41.628	Arnaud Hybois (FRA)	1:41.802
K–1 1000 m	Max Hoff (GER)	3:44.210	Ken Wallace (AUS)	3:44.652	Bence Dombvári (HUN)	3:44.680
K–1 5000 m	Ken Wallace (AUS)	19:44.059	Daniel Dal Bo (ARG)	19:46.138	Edward Rutherford (GBR)	19:47.275
K–2 200 m	Russia; Yury Postrigay; Alexander Dyachenko	31.182	Great Britain; Liam Heath; Jon Schofield	31.755	Germany; Ronald Rauhe; Jonas Ems	31.901
K–2 500 m	Portugal; Emanuel Silva; João Ribeiro	1:32.622	Belarus; Raman Piatrushenka; Vadzim Makhneu	1:32.711	France; Sébastien Jouve; Maxime Beaumont	1:33.023
K–2 1000 m	Germany; Max Rendschmidt; Marcus Gross	3:22.331	Belarus; Pavel Miadzvedzeu; Aleh Yurenia	3:23.002	Hungary; Rudolf Dombi; Roland Kökény	3:23.021
K–4 1000 m	Russia; Vitaly Yurchenko; Vasily Pogreban; Anton Vasilev; Oleg Zhestkov	2:58.692	Czech Republic; Daniel Havel; Lukáš Trefil; Josef Dostál; Jan Štěrba	2:59.375	Australia; Tate Smith; David Smith; Murray Stewart; Jacob Clear	2:59.942
K–1 200 m Relay	Poland; Piotr Siemionowski; Denis Amroziak; Sebastian Szypula; Dawid Putto	2:27.605	Russia; Yury Postrigay; Maxim Molochkov; Oleg Kharitonov; Alexander Dyachenko	2:27.967	Hungary; Miklós Dudás; Sándor Tótka; Péter Molnár; Dávid Hérics	2:28.092

=== Women ===
Non-Olympic classes

==== Canoe ====
Event	Gold		Silver		Bronze	
C–1 200 m	Laurence Vincent-Lapointe (CAN)	51.330	Staniliya Stamenova (BUL)	52.028	Zsanett Lakatos (HUN)	52.527
C–2 500 m	Canada; Laurence Vincent-Lapointe; Sara-Jane Caumartin	2:03.004	Hungary; Zsanett Lakatos; Kincső Takács	2:04.842	Chile; Nancy Millan; María Mailliard	2:07.876

==== Kayak ====
Event	Gold		Silver		Bronze	
K–1 200 m m	Lisa Carrington (NZL)	39.522	Marta Walczykiewicz (POL)	39.712	Špela Ponomarenko Janić (SLO)	39.951
K–1 500 m	Danuta Kozák (HUN)	1:57.395	Katrin Wagner-Augustin (GER)	1:58.300	Lisa Carrington (NZL)	1:58.619
K–1 1000 m	Erika Medveczky (HUN)	4:11.345	Verena Hantl (GER)	4:14.126	Edyta Dzieniszewska (POL)	4:14.677
K–1 5000 m	Teneale Hatton (NZL)	22:08.367	Renáta Csay (HUN)	22:31.301	Anne Rikala (FIN)	22:32.654
K–2 200 m	Germany; Franziska Weber; Tina Dietze	37.525	Poland; Karolina Naja; Beata Mikołajczyk	38.181	Serbia; Nikolina Moldovan; Olivera Moldovan	38.223
K–2 500 m	Germany; Franziska Weber; Tina Dietze	1:47.070	Hungary; Katalin Kovács; Natasa Dusev-Janics	1:48.006	Poland; Karolina Naja; Beata Mikołajczyk	1:48.537
K–2 1000 m	Hungary; Gabriella Szabó; Krisztina Fazekas Zur	3:53.740	Germany; Carolin Leonhardt; Conny Waßmuth	3:56.344	Romania; Irina Lauric; Bianca Plesca	3:58.996
K–4 500 m	Hungary; Gabriella Szabó; Danuta Kozák; Krisztina Fazekas Zur; Ninetta Vad	1:32.272	Germany; Franziska Weber; Tina Dietze; Katrin Wagner-Augustin; Verena Hantl	1:33.510	Belarus; Marharyta Tsishkevich; Nadzeya Papok; Volha Khudzenka; Maryna Litvinchuk	1:33.642
K–1 200 m Relay	Hungary; Natasa Dusev-Janics; Ninetta Vad; Krisztina Fazekas Zur; Danuta Kozák	2:49.415	Poland; Karolina Naja; Edyta Dzieniszewska; Ewelina Wojnarowska; Marta Walczykiewicz	2:49.609	Russia; Natalia Podolskaya; Elena Polyakova; Natalia Lobova; Natalia Proskurina	2:51.679

=== Paracanoe ===
Non-Paralympic classes

Event	Gold		Silver		Bronze	
Men's K–1 200 m A	Fernando Fernandes de Pádua (BRA)	51.330	Ian Marsden (GBR)	51.920	Christian Mathes (GER)	53.021
Men's K–1 200 m TA	Mendy Swoboda (AUT)	40.790	Victor Potanin (RUS)	43.205	Pier Alberto Buccoliero (ITA)	45.892
Men's K–1 200 m LTA	Tom Kierey (GER)	38.891	Iulian Serban (ROU)	39.505	Yuriy Kikhayev (UKR)	39.840
Men's V–1 200 m A	Oleksandr Hrechko (UKR)	1:01.610	Jakub Tokarz (POL)	1:03.813	Daniel Hopwood (GBR)	1:11.275
Men's V–1 200 m TA	Javier Reja Muñoz (ESP)	56.111	Nicholas Heald (GBR)	56.719	Tomasz Mozdzierski (POL)	56.754
Men's V–1 200 m LTA	Caio Ribeiro de Carvalho (BRA)	50.613	Patrick Viriamu (TAH)	51.713	Miroslaw Rosinski (POL)	52.561
Women's K–1 200 m A	Jeanette Chippington (GBR)	59.808	Svitlana Kupriianova (UKR)	1:03.305	Alexandra Dupik (RUS)	1:06.423
Women's K–1 200 m TA	Emma Wiggs (GBR)	56.892	Megan Blunk (USA)	57.507	Nataliia Lagutenko (UKR)	1:04.271
Women's K–1 200 m LTA	Christine Gauthier (CAN)	54.317	Anne Dickins (GBR)	54.889	Cindy Moreau (FRA)	54.977
Women's V–1 200 m A	Jeanette Chippington (GBR)	1:05.628	Kara Kennedy (AUS)	1:17.466	Ann Yoshida (USA)	1:31.382
Women's V–1 200 m TA	Jeanette Chippington (GBR)	1:03.243	Megan Blunk (USA)	1:10.838	Tamara Oliveira da Silva (BRA)	1:11.469
Women's V–1 200 m LTA	Andrea Green (GBR)	59.967	Christine Gauthier (CAN)	1:01.878	Anya Pierce (USA)	1:03.898
