= Tiantian =

Tiantian or Tian Tian may refer to:

== People ==
- Tian Tian (chess player) (田甜, born 1983), Chinese Women Chess Grandmaster
- Li Tiantian (李甜甜, fl. 2010), Chinese woman's sprint canoeist
- Sun Tiantian (孙甜甜 Sūn Tiántián), (born 1981) Chinese woman tennis player
- Wang Tiantian (王湉湉 Wáng Tiántián), (born 1986) Chinese female gymnast

== Pandas ==
- Tian Tian (male giant panda) (添添 Tiān Tiān, born 1997), a male panda on loan to the National Zoo in Washington, DC, US
- Tian Tian (female giant panda) (甜甜 Tián Tián, born 2003), a female panda on loan to the Edinburgh Zoo in Edinburgh, Scotland, UK

== Other ==
- Pethia tiantian or P. tiantian, a species of fish
