= Gerhard Bowitzky =

German paracanoeist

Medal record

Men's paracanoe

Representing Germany

ICF Canoe Sprint World Championships
Gold medal – first place	2012 Poznań	V-1 LTA
Silver medal – second place	2010 Poznań	V-1 200 m LTA, TA, A
Bronze medal – third place	2011 Szeged	V–1 200 m LTA

Gerhard Bowitzky is a German paracanoeist who has competed since the late 2000s. He won a silver medal in the V-1 200 m LTA, TA, A event at the 2010 ICF Canoe Sprint World Championships in Poznań.
