= Lorella =

Lorella is a given name and may refer to:

- Lorella Bellato, Italian paracanoer
- Lorella Cedroni (1961–2013), Italian political philosopher
- Lorella Cuccarini (born 1965), Italian dancer, singer, television host and actress
- Lorella Jones (1943–1995), American particle physicist
- Lorella De Luca (1940–2014), Italian film, television, and voice actress

Lorella may also refer to the unincorporated community Lorella, Oregon.
