= Nicolae Bogdan =

Romanian sprint canoer

Medal record

Men's canoe sprint

World Championships
| Silver medal – second place | 2010 Poznań | C-4 1000 m |

Nicolae Bogdan is a Romanian sprint canoer who has been competing since the late 2000s. He won a silver medal in the C-4 1000 m event at the 2010 ICF Canoe Sprint World Championships in Poznań.
