= Henrik Vasbányai =

Hungarian canoeist

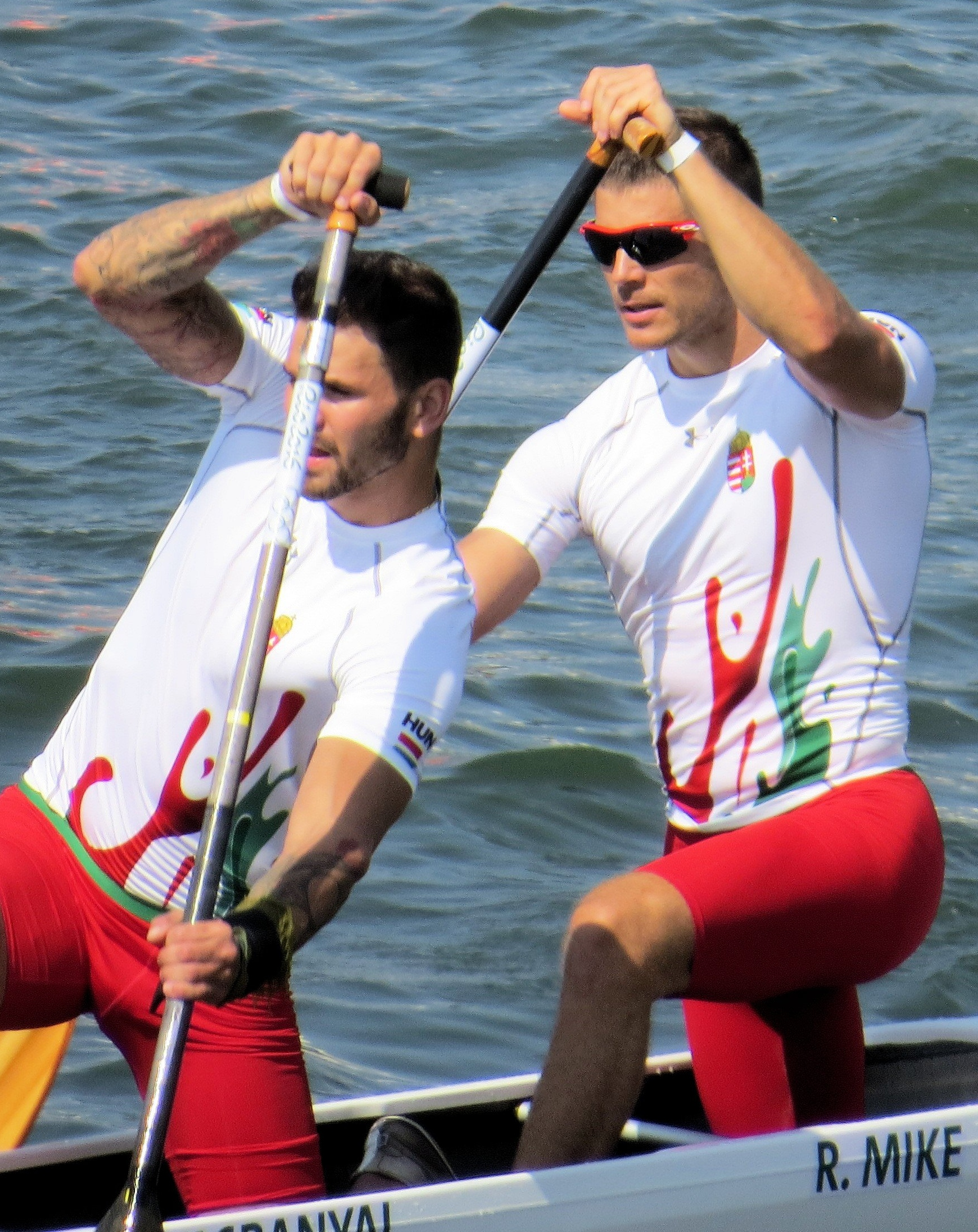
- Vasbányai (left) and Mike at the 2016 Olympics

Personal information
- Born: 16 July 1991 (age 34)
- Height: 187 cm (6 ft 2 in)
- Weight: 84 kg (185 lb)

Sport
- Sport: Canoe sprint
- Club: KSI SE, Budapest
- Coached by: Tamas Olah (personal); Botond Storcz (national)
Medal record
Representing Hungary
World Championships
Bronze medal – third place	2011 Szeged	C-4 1000 m
Gold medal – first place	2013 Duisburg	C-2 1000 m
Silver medal – second place	2013 Duisburg	C-2 500 m
Silver medal – second place	2014 Moscow	C-2 1000 m
Silver medal – second place	2015 Milan	C-2 1000 m
European Championships
Bronze medal – third place	2012 Zagreb	C-4 1000 m
Silver medal – second place	2013 Montemor-o-Velho	C-2 1000 m
Gold medal – first place	2014 Brandenburg	C-2 1000 m
Bronze medal – third place	2016 Moscow	C-2 1000 m

Henrik Vasbányai (born 16 July 1991) is a Hungarian canoeist. He achieved his best results in two-man and four-man events, partnering with Róbert Mike. Between 2013 and 2015, they won one gold and three silver medals at the world championships. They placed fourth at the 2016 Olympics. In 2014, Vasbányai was named Male Canoeist of the Year by the Hungarian Canoe Federation.
