= Giovanna Chiriu =

Italian paracanoeist

Medal record

Women's paracanoe

World Championships
Bronze medal – third place	2010 Poznań	K-1 200 m LTA

Giovanna Chiriu is an Italian paracanoeist who has competed since the late 2000s. She won a bronze medal in the K-1 200 m LTA event at the 2010 ICF Canoe Sprint World Championships in Poznań.
