= 2023 ICF Canoe Sprint World Championships – Women's VL1 =

Women's VL1 at the 2023 ICF Canoe Sprint World Championships
- Venue: Sportpark Duisburg
- Location: Duisburg, Germany
- Dates: 25 August
- Competitors: 6 from 5 nations
- Winning time: 1:10.952

Medalists
gold medal	Viktoryia Shablova	Italy
silver medal	Pooja Ojha	India
bronze medal	Jocelyn Muñoz	Chile

The women's VL1 competition at the 2023 ICF Canoe Sprint World Championships in Duisburg took place at Sportpark Duisburg.

== Schedule ==
The schedule was as follows:

Date	Time	Round
Friday 25 August 2023	14:27	Final

All times are Central European Summer Time (UTC+2)

== Results ==
With fewer than ten competitors entered, this event was held as a direct final.

Rank	Name	Country	Time
1st place, gold medalist(s)	Viktoryia Shablova	Italy	1:10.952
2nd place, silver medalist(s)	Pooja Ojha	India	1:18.736
3rd place, bronze medalist(s)	Jocelyn Muñoz	Chile	1:19.618
4	Lillemor Köper	Germany	1:23.528
5	Andrea Silva	Brazil	1:25.178
6	Esther Bode	Germany	1:28.290
