= Tami Hetke =

American paracanoeist

Medal record

Women's paracanoe

Representing United States

World Championships
Silver medal – second place	2010 Poznań	V-1 200 m LTA, TA, A
Bronze medal – third place	2011 Szeged	V–1 200 m LTA

Tami Hetke (born September 29, 1970) is an American paracanoeist who has competed since the late 2000s. She won a silver medal in the V-1 200 m LTA, TA, A event at the 2010 ICF Canoe Sprint World Championships in Poznań.
