= Séverine Amiot =

French paracanoeist

Medal record

Women's paracanoe

World Championships
Bronze medal – third place	2010 Poznań	K-1 200 m TA

Séverine Amiot (born 17 October 1979 in Dijon, France) is a French paracanoeist who has competed since the late 2000s. She won a bronze medal in the K-1 200 m TA event at the 2010 ICF Canoe Sprint World Championships in Poznań.

== Biography ==
In 2009, Séverine Amiot placed third in the single kayak event at the World Championships in Dartmouth, Nova Scotia, Canada. However, the para-sport events were held as demonstration events at that competition.

She won the bronze medal at the 2010 World Rowing Championships in Poznań, Poland where para-rowing events were officially included in the program for the first time.

== Bibliography ==
- 2010 ICF Canoe Sprint World Championships women's K-1 200 m TA results. - accessed 20 August 2010.
