= 2022 ICF Canoe Sprint World Championships – Women's VL1 =

Canoe Sprint World Championship 2022 - Women

Women's VL1 at the 2022 ICF Canoe Sprint World Championships
- Venue: Lake Banook
- Location: Dartmouth, Canada
- Dates: 3 August
- Competitors: 4 from 3 nations
- Winning time: 1:29.79

Medalists
gold medal	Lillemor Köper	Germany
silver medal	Pooja Ojha	India
bronze medal	Esther Bode	Germany

The women's VL1 competition at the 2022 ICF Canoe Sprint World Championships in Dartmouth took place on Lake Banook.

== Schedule ==
The schedule was as follows:

Date	Time	Round
Wednesday 3 August 2022	16:50	Final

All times are Atlantic Daylight Time (UTC−3)

== Results ==
With fewer than ten competitors entered, this event was held as a direct final.

Rank	Name	Country	Time
1st place, gold medalist(s)	Lillemor Köper	Germany	1:29.79
2nd place, silver medalist(s)	Pooja Ojha	India	1:34.18
3rd place, bronze medalist(s)	Esther Bode	Germany	1:35.16
4	Jocelyn Muñoz	Chile	1:45.78
