= Aleksandr Nikolayev (canoeist) =

Russian canoeist

Medal record

Men's canoe sprint

World Championships
Bronze medal – third place	2010 Poznań	K-1 4 x 200 m

Alexander Sergeyevich Nikolaev (Russian: Алекса́ндр Серге́евич Никола́ев; born 30 January 1990) is a Russian sprint canoer who has competed since the late 2000s. He won a bronze medal in the K-1 4 x 200 m event at the 2010 ICF Canoe Sprint World Championships in Poznań.
