= Jono Broome =

British paracanoeist

Medal record

Men's paracanoe

World Championships
Bronze medal – third place	2010 Poznań	K-1 200 m A

Jono Broome is a British paracanoeist who has competed since the late 2000s. He won a bronze medal in the K-1 200 m A event at the 2010 ICF Canoe Sprint World Championships in Poznań.
