= Nikolina Moldovan =

Serbian canoeist (born 1990)

Personal information
- Born: 1 May 1990 (age 36) Belgrade, SR Serbia, Yugoslavia
Medal record
Women's canoe sprint
Representing Serbia
World Championships
Silver medal – second place	2014 Moscow	K-2 500 m
Bronze medal – third place	2013 Duisburg	K-2 200 m
Bronze medal – third place	2014 Moscow	K-1 200 m
European Championships
Bronze medal – third place	2014 Brandenburg	K-2 500 m
Bronze medal – third place	2015 Račice	K-1 200 m
Bronze medal – third place	2015 Račice	K-2 200 m
European Games
Silver medal – second place	2015 Baku	K-2 200m
European U23 Championships
Gold medal – first place	2009 Poznań	K-2 500 m
Gold medal – first place	2010 Moscow	K-2 500 m
Gold medal – first place	2013 Poznań	K-1 500 m
Silver medal – second place	2010 Moscow	K-2 200 m
Silver medal – second place	2011 Zagreb	K-1 200 m
Silver medal – second place	2013 Poznań	K-1 200 m
Universiade
Silver medal – second place	2013 Kazan	K-2 200 m
Bronze medal – third place	2013 Kazan	K-1 200 m
Bronze medal – third place	2013 Kazan	K-2 500 m

Nikolina Moldovan (Serbian Cyrillic: Николина Молдован; born 1 May 1990) is a Serbian sprint canoer.

== Career ==
Nikolina was born on 1 May 1990 in Belgrade, SR Serbia, Yugoslavia to a Serb father, Zoran Moldovan and a Russian mother, Tatjana, originally from Sochi, Russian SFSR, Soviet Union.

Her sister Olivera Moldovan is also a sprint canoer.

Nikolina represented Serbia at the 2012 Summer Olympics in 2 disciplines: K-1 200m and K-2 500m (with her sister, Olivera Moldovan). Moldovan competed in the same event at the 2016 Summer Olympics. In the K-2 500m she competed with Milica Starović.

Awards
Preceded by Tatjana Jelača	The Best Young Athlete of Serbia; 2010 (with Olivera Moldovan)	Succeeded by Amela Terzić and Uroš Kovačević
