= Mariusz Kruk =

Polish canoeist

Medal record

Men's canoe sprint
Event	1st	2nd	3rd
Olympic Games	0	0	0
World Championships	0	0	1
European Championships	0	0	1
European Games	0	0	0
Total	0	0	2

World Championships
Bronze medal – third place	2010 Poznań	C-1 4 x 200 m

European Championships
Bronze medal – third place	2011 Belgrade	C-2 500 m

Mariusz Kruk is a Polish sprint canoer who has competed since the late 2000s. He won a bronze medal in the C-1 4 x 200 meter relay at the 2010 ICF Canoe Sprint World Championships in Poznań.
