= Marta Santos Ferreira =

Brazilian paracanoeist

Medal record

Women's paracanoe

Representing Brazil

World Championships
Gold medal – first place	2010 Poznań	K-1 200 m TA
Gold medal – first place	2011 Szeged	K–1 200 m TA
Silver medal – second place	2010 Poznań	K-1 200 m LTA
Bronze medal – third place	2011 Szeged	K–1 200 m LTA

Marta Santos Ferreira is a Brazilian paracanoeist who has competed since the late 2000s. She won two medals at the 2010 ICF Canoe Sprint World Championships in Poznań with a gold in the K-1 200m TA and a silver in the K-1 200m LTA events.
