= 2019 ICF Canoe Sprint World Championships – Women's VL2 =

Women's VL2 at the 2019 ICF Canoe Sprint World Championships
- Venue: Olympic Centre of Szeged
- Location: Szeged, Hungary
- Dates: 21–22 August
- Competitors: 11 from 9 nations
- Winning time: 56.10

Medalists
gold medal	Emma Wiggs	Great Britain
silver medal	Susan Seipel	Australia
bronze medal	Maria Nikiforova	Russia

The women's VL2 competition at the 2019 ICF Canoe Sprint World Championships in Szeged took place at the Olympic Centre of Szeged.

== Schedule ==
The schedule was as follows:

Date	Time	Round
Wednesday 21 August 2019	09:50	Heats
Wednesday 21 August 2019	12:50	Semifinal
Thursday 22 August 2019	16:35	Final

All times are Central European Summer Time (UTC+2)

== Results ==
=== Heats ===
The fastest three boats in each heat advanced directly to the final.
The next four fastest boats in each heat, plus the fastest remaining boat advanced to the semifinal.

==== Heat 1 ====
Rank	Name	Country	Time	Notes
1	Emma Wiggs	Great Britain	58.44	QF
2	Maria Nikiforova	Russia	1:00.93	QF
3	Edina Müller	Germany	1:11.05	QF
4	Katherine Wollermann	Chile	1:16.30	QS
5	Kaitlyn Verfuerth	United States	1:17.29	QS
6	Pooja Ojha	India	1:28.81	QS

==== Heat 2 ====
Rank	Name	Country	Time	Notes
1	Susan Seipel	Australia	59.64	QF
2	Débora Benevides	Brazil	1:03.01	QF
3	Katharina Bauernschmidt	Germany	1:05.70	QF
4	Veronica Biglia	Italy	1:08.69	QS
5	Prachi Yadav	India	1:18.25	QS

=== Semifinal ===
The fastest three boats advanced to the final.

Rank	Name	Country	Time	Notes
1	Veronica Biglia	Italy	1:07.47	QF
2	Kaitlyn Verfuerth	United States	1:12.55	QF
3	Katherine Wollermann	Chile	1:14.51	QF
4	Prachi Yadav	India	1:18.31	
5	Pooja Ojha	India	1:29.19	

=== Final ===
Competitors raced for positions 1 to 9, with medals going to the top three.

Rank	Name	Country	Time
1st place, gold medalist(s)	Emma Wiggs	Great Britain	56.10
2nd place, silver medalist(s)	Susan Seipel	Australia	57.74
3rd place, bronze medalist(s)	Maria Nikiforova	Russia	59.24
4	Débora Benevides	Brazil	1:01.62
5	Katharina Bauernschmidt	Germany	1:03.89
6	Veronica Biglia	Italy	1:05.61
7	Edina Müller	Germany	1:08.27
8	Kaitlyn Verfuerth	United States	1:09.04
9	Katherine Wollermann	Chile	1:09.83
