= Edward Cox (canoeist) =

British sprint canoeist

Medal record

Men's canoe sprint

World Championships
Silver medal – second place	2010 Poznań	K-1 4 x 200 m

Edward Cox (born 25 July 1985) is a British sprint canoeist who has competed since the late 2000s. He won a silver medal in the K-1 4 × 200 m event at the 2010 ICF Canoe Sprint World Championships in Poznań.
