= Antonio de Diego =

Spanish paracanoeist

Medal record

Men's paracanoe

Representing Spain

World Championships
Silver medal – second place	2010 Poznań	K-1 200 m A
Bronze medal – third place	2011 Szeged	K-1 200 m A

European Championships
Gold medal – first place	2010 Trasona	K-1 200 m A
Silver medal – second place	2012 Zagreb	K-1 200 m A

Antonio de Diego Álvarez is a Spanish paracanoeist and member of the National Spanish Canoeist Team, Paracanoe class A (maximum level of disability).

He was born in Madrid in 1967, with an 85% physical disability rating. He has gone from not being able to turn around in a bed without help to being a member of the Spanish canoeing team in the Paracanoe mode.

On 2 July 2004 he suffered a motorcycling accident requiring a double femoral amputation and causing major paralysis in his right arm.

He has won several medals: gold medal at the Europe Paracanoe Championship Trasona 2010(K-1 200 m), silver medal at the world championship Paracanoe Poznan 2010 (K-1 200 m), bronze medal World Paracone Szeged 2011 (K-1 200 m) and silver medal at the Europe Paracanoe Championship Zagreb 2012. He also practices other sports such as diving, yachting and handcycling.

A High Level Athlete in the Spanish National Team and a member of the Spanish Paralympic team until 2015 when he withdrew from the competition.

In 2009 and 2011 he was awarded as the best athlete with physical disability at the Nit de L`sport Gala in Barcelona and in 2012 as the best athlete with physical disability at the Sports Gala of the Community of Madrid.

He practices other complementary sports very actively; sailing, scuba diving, cycling and more casual athletics with prostheses special.

Athlete federated by the FCDDF (Catalan Federation of Physical Disabled Sports) and the RFEC (Royal Spanish Cycling Federation), FCV (Catalan Sailing Federation), by the FCP (Catalan Canoeing Federation) and the RFEP (Royal Spanish Canoeing Federation)

Diver since 2005, trained by American HSA and European IAHD organizations.
