= George Thomas (canoeist) =

New Zealand paracanoeist

Medal record

Men's paracanoe

Representing New Zealand

ICF Canoe Sprint World Championships
| Bronze medal – third place | 2010 Poznań | V-1 200 m LTA, TA, A |

George Thomas is a paracanoeist from New Zealand who has competed since the late 2000s. He won a bronze medal in the V-1 200 m LTA, TA, A event at the 2010 ICF Canoe Sprint World Championships in Poznań.
