= Stanislav Shymansky =

Ukrainian canoeist

Medal record

Men's canoe sprint

World Championships
Silver medal – second place	2010 Poznań	C-1 4 x 200 m

Stanislav Shymansky is a Ukrainian sprint canoer who has competed since the late 2000s. He won a silver medal in the C-1 4 × 200 m relay at the 2010 ICF Canoe Sprint World Championships in Poznań.
