= Edyta Dzieniszewska =

Polish canoeist (born 1986)

Medal record

Women's canoe sprint

Representing Poland
Event	1st	2nd	3rd
Olympic Games	0	0	0
World Championships	1	2	1
European Championships	1	1	1
European Games	0	0	1
Total	2	3	3

World Championships
Gold medal – first place	2014 Moscow	K-1 4x200 m Relay
Silver medal – second place	2013 Duisburg	K–1 4x200 m Relay
Silver medal – second place	2014 Moscow	K-4 500 m
Bronze medal – third place	2013 Duisburg	K-1 1000 m

European Championships
Gold medal – first place	2005 Poznań	K-4 1000 m
Silver medal – second place	2008 Milan	K-4 1000 m
Bronze medal – third place	2011 Belgrade	K-1 1000 m

European Games
Bronze medal – third place	2015 Baku	K-4 500 m

Edyta Dzieniszewska-Kierkla (Polish pronunciation: [ɛˈdɨta d͡ʑɛniˈʂɛfska]; born 5 May 1986, in Augustów) is a Polish canoe sprinter who has competed since the late 2000s. At the 2008 Summer Olympics in Beijing, she finished fourth in the K-4 500 m event. In June 2015, she competed in the inaugural European Games, for Poland in canoe sprint, more specifically, Women's K-4 500m with Ewelina Wojnarowska, Karolina Naja, and Beata Mikołajczyk. She earned a bronze medal.
