= 2014 ICF Canoe Sprint World Championships =

Canoe racing event in Moscow, Russia

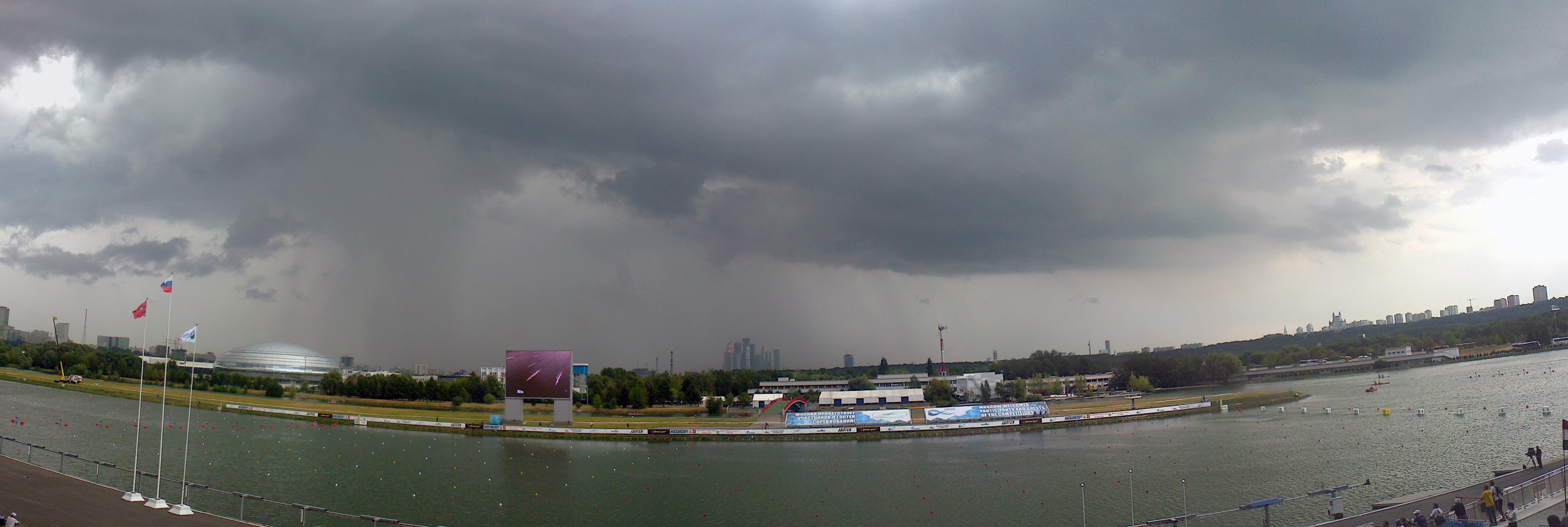
- Location: Moscow, Russia
- Start date: 6
- End date: 10 August 2014

The 2014 ICF Canoe Sprint World Championships was held from 6–10 August 2014 in Moscow, Russia.

They were chosen at an ICF board of directors meeting in Budapest on 10 April 2010.

== Explanation of events ==
Canoe sprint competitions are broken up into Canadian canoe (C), an open canoe with a single-blade paddle, or in kayaks (K), a closed canoe with a double-bladed paddle. Each canoe or kayak can hold one person (1), two people (2), or four people (4). For each of the specific canoes or kayaks, such as a K-1 (kayak single), the competition distances can be 200 metres (660 ft), 500 metres (1,600 ft), or 1,000 metres (3,300 ft) long. When a competition is listed as a C-2 500 m event as an example, it means two people are in a canoe competing at a 500 metres (1,600 ft) distance.

== Medal summary ==
=== Men ===
Non-Olympic classes

==== Canoe ====
Event	Gold		Silver		Bronze	
C–1 200 m	Yuriy Cheban (UKR)	38.137	Alexey Korovashkov (RUS)	38.143	Jevgenij Shuklin (LTU)	38.423
C–1 500 m	Isaquias Queiroz (BRA)	1:47.916	Sebastian Brendel (GER)	1:49.433	Martin Fuksa (CZE)	1:49.726
C–1 1000 m	Sebastian Brendel (GER)	3:44.578	Martin Fuksa (CZE)	3:48.180	Attila Vajda (HUN)	3:49.296
C–1 5000 m	Sebastian Brendel (GER)	23:09.973	Attila Vajda (HUN)	23:11.057	Pavel Petrov (RUS)	23:18.224
C–2 200 m	Russia; Alexey Korovashkov; Ivan Shtyl	35.350	Germany; Stefan Holtz; Robert Nuck	35.706	Brazil; Isaquias Queiroz; Erlon Silva	36.064
C–2 500 m	Russia; Alexey Korovashkov; Ivan Shtyl	1:35.829	Romania; Alexandru Dumitrescu; Victor Mihalachi	1:38.381	Cuba; Rolexis Baez; Serguey Torres	1:39.385
C–2 1000 m	Romania; Alexandru Dumitrescu; Victor Mihalachi	3:28.340	Hungary; Henrik Vasbányai; Róbert Mike	3:28.690	Germany; Yul Oeltze; Ronald Verch	3:30.442
C–4 1000 m	Russia; Rasul Ishmukhamedov; Viktor Melantyev; Ilya Pervukhin; Kirill Shamshurin	3:10.701	Belarus; Dzianis Harazha; Dzmitry Rabchanka; Dzmitry Vaitsishkin; Aleksandr Vauchetskiy	3:13.420	Hungary; Tamás Kiss; Pál Sarudi; Dávid Varga; András Vass	3:13.498
C–1 4 × 200 m Relay	Russia; Alexey Korovashkov; Andrey Kraitor; Nikolay Lipkin; Ivan Shtyl	2:43.602	Ukraine; Yuriy Cheban; Vitalii Goliuk; Oleksandr Maksymchuk; Vadym Tsipan	2:48.629	Hungary; Jonatán Hajdu; Dávid Korisánszky; Ádám Lantos; Péter Nagy	2:50.046

==== Kayak ====
Event	Gold		Silver		Bronze	
K–1 200 m	Mark de Jonge (CAN)	33.961	Petter Menning (SWE)	34.088	Ed McKeever (GBR); Saúl Craviotto (ESP)	34.270
K–1 500 m	René Holten Poulsen (DEN)	1:39.190	Bence Dombvári (HUN)	1:39.351	Marcus Walz (ESP)	1:39.692
K–1 1000 m	Josef Dostál (CZE)	3:25.092	Miroslav Kirchev (BUL)	3:26.409	René Holten Poulsen (DEN)	3:26.482
K–1 5000 m	Ken Wallace (AUS)	20:12.981	Max Hoff (GER)	20:14.004	Cyrille Carré (FRA)	20:14.562
K–2 200 m	Serbia; Nebojša Grujić; Marko Novaković	30.500 WB	Germany; Tom Liebscher; Ronald Rauhe	30.606	France; Maxime Beaumont; Sébastien Jouve	30.884
K–2 500 m	Slovakia; Erik Vlček; Juraj Tarr	1:28.187	Hungary; Rudolf Dombi; Gergely Boros	1:28.203	Belarus; Raman Piatrushenka; Vadzim Makhneu	1:29.292
K–2 1000 m	Slovakia; Erik Vlček; Juraj Tarr	3:08.784	Australia; Ken Wallace; Lachlan Tame	3:09.637	Serbia; Marko Tomićević; Vladimir Torubarov	3:09.857
K–4 1000 m	Czech Republic; Daniel Havel; Lukáš Trefil; Josef Dostál; Jan Štěrba	2:46.724	Portugal; Fernando Pimenta; João Ribeiro; Emanuel Silva; David Fernandes	2:46.939	Hungary; Zoltán Kammerer; Dávid Tóth; Tamás Kulifai; Dániel Pauman	2:48.039
K–1 4 × 200 m Relay	Hungary; Miklós Dudás; Dávid Hérics; Bence Nádas; Sándor Tótka	2:24.193	France; Maxime Beaumont; Étienne Hubert; Arnaud Hybois; Sébastien Jouve	2:24.348	Great Britain; Liam Heath; Ed McKeever; Kristian Reeves; Jon Schofield	2:24.972

=== Women ===
Non-Olympic classes

==== Canoe ====
Event	Gold		Silver		Bronze	
C–1 200 m	Laurence Vincent Lapointe (CAN)	46.419	Staniliya Stamenova (BUL)	46.977	Valdenice Conceição (BRA)	47.099
C–2 500 m	Hungary; Zsanett Lakatos; Kincső Takács	2:03.152	Belarus; Daryna Kastsiuchenka; Kamila Bobr	2:04.562	Russia; Natalia Marasanova; Olesia Romasenko	2:06.719

==== Kayak ====
Event	Gold		Silver		Bronze	
K–1 200 m	Lisa Carrington (NZL)	37.898 WB	Marta Walczykiewicz (POL)	38.814	Nikolina Moldovan (SRB)	39.416
K–1 500 m	Danuta Kozák (HUN)	1:49.283	Lisa Carrington (NZL)	1:49.790	Bridgitte Hartley (RSA)	1:50.496
K–1 1000 m	Teneale Hatton (NZL)	3:49.423	Tamara Csipes (HUN)	3:49.474	Dalma Ružičić-Benedek (SRB)	3:49.780
K–1 5000 m	Louisa Sawers (GBR)	23:10.957	Maryna Pautaran (BLR)	23:15.158	Renáta Csay (HUN)	23:21.060
K–2 200 m	Hungary; Anna Kárász; Ninetta Vad	35.869	Germany; Franziska Weber; Tina Dietze	35.986	Belarus; Marharyta Tsishkevich; Maryna Litvinchuk	36.217
K–2 500 m	Hungary; Gabriella Szabó; Tamara Csipes	1:39.935	Serbia; Nikolina Moldovan; Olivera Moldovan	1:40.480	Poland; Karolina Naja; Beata Mikołajczyk	1:41.337
K–2 1000 m	Denmark; Henriette Engel Hansen; Emma Jørgensen	3:33.784	Belarus; Aleksandra Grishina; Sofiya Yurchanka	3:35.818	Hungary; Erika Medveczky; Alíz Sarudi	3:35.949
K–4 500 m	Hungary; Anna Kárász; Danuta Kozák; Gabriella Szabó; Ninetta Vad	1:28.219	Poland; Edyta Dzieniszewska; Beata Mikołajczyk; Karolina Naja; Marta Walczykiewicz	1:28.942	Belarus; Volha Khudzenka; Nadzeya Papok; Maryna Pautaran; Marharyta Tsishkevich	1:29.585
K–1 4 × 200 m Relay	Poland; Edyta Dzieniszewska; Karolina Naja; Marta Walczykiewicz; Ewelina Wojnarowska	2:47.793	Russia; Natalia Lobova; Anastasia Panchenko; Natalia Podolskaya; Elena Terekhova	2:48.833	Belarus; Maryna Pautaran; Volha Khudzenka; Marharyta Tsishkevich; Sofiya Yurchanka	2:49.762

=== Medal table ===
Rank	Nation	Gold	Silver	Bronze	Total
1	Hungary	6	5	6	17
2	Russia	4	2	2	8
3	Germany	2	5	1	8
4	Czech Republic	2	1	1	4
5	New Zealand	2	1	0	3
6	Denmark	2	0	1	3
7	Canada	2	0	0	2
7	Slovakia	2	0	0	2
9	Poland	1	2	1	4
10	Serbia	1	1	3	5
11	Australia	1	1	0	2
11	Romania	1	1	0	2
11	Ukraine	1	1	0	2
14	Brazil	1	0	2	3
14	Great Britain	1	0	2	3
16	Belarus	0	4	4	8
17	Bulgaria	0	2	0	2
18	France	0	1	2	3
19	Portugal	0	1	0	1
19	Sweden	0	1	0	1
21	Spain	0	0	2	2
22	Cuba	0	0	1	1
22	Lithuania	0	0	1	1
22	South Africa	0	0	1	1
Totals (24 entries)		29	29	30	88

=== Paracanoeing ===
Event	Gold	Time	Silver	Time	Bronze	Time
Men's K–1 200 m A	András Rozbora (HUN)	49.375	Ian Marsden (GBR)	49.866	Igor Korobeynikov (RUS)	50.095
Men's K–1 200 m TA	Markus Mendy Swoboda (AUT)	40.928	Fernando Rufino de Paulo (BRA)	41.872	Victor Potanin (RUS)	42.906
Men's K–1 200 m LTA	Yuriy Kikhayev (UKR)	39.208	Iulian Serban (ROU)	39.467	Leonid Krylov (RUS)	39.962
Men's V–1 200 m A	Luis Carlos Cardoso da Silva (BRA)	54.944	Oleksandr Hrechko (UKR)	57.481	Róbert Suba (HUN)	59.136
Men's V–1 200 m TA	Curtis McGrath (AUS)	48.596	Jonathan Young (GBR)	49.613	Victor Potanin (RUS)	52.356
Men's V–1 200 m LTA	Pier Alberto Buccoliero (ITA)	50.368	Martin Tweedie (GBR)	51.369	Aleksei Egorov (RUS)	51.806
Women's K–1 200 m A	Jeanette Chippington (GBR)	55.213	Svitlana Kupriianova (UKR)	59.292	Alexandra Dupik (RUS)	59.856
Women's K–1 200 m TA	Emma Wiggs (GBR)	53.128	Christine Gauthier (CAN)	53.505	Nataliia Lagutenko (UKR)	55.235
Women's K–1 200 m LTA	Anne Dickins (GBR)	49.700	Cindy Moreau (FRA)	49.813	Amanda Reynolds (AUS)	51.247
Women's V–1 200 m A	Jeanette Chippington (GBR)	1:00.016	Kara Kennedy (AUS)	1:06.718	Zoia Ovsii (UKR)	1:31.382
Women's V–1 200 m TA	Emma Wiggs (GBR)	1:00.358	Christine Gauthier (CAN)	1:02.565	Nataliia Lagutenko (UKR)	1:03.666
Women's V–1 200 m LTA	Andrea Green (GBR)	57.948	Larisa Volik (RUS)	1:00.749	Christine Gauthier (CAN)	1:01.908
