= 2025 ICF Canoe Sprint World Championships – Women's VL1 =

Women's VL1 at the 2025 ICF Canoe Sprint World Championships
- Venue: Idroscalo Regatta Course
- Location: Milan, Italy
- Dates: 22 August
- Competitors: 6 from 5 nations
- Winning time: 1:06.99

Medalists
| gold medal | Chinette Karina Lauridsen | Germany |
| silver medal | Viktoryia Shablova | Italy |
| bronze medal | Monika Seryu | Japan |

The women's VL1 competition at the 2025 ICF Canoe Sprint World Championships in Milan took place at the Idroscalo Regatta Course.

== Schedule ==
The schedule is as follows:

| Date | Time | Round |
|---|---|---|
| Friday 22 August 2025 | 15:58 | Final |

== Results ==
With fewer than ten competitors entered, this event was held as a direct final.

| Rank | Name | Country | Time |
|---|---|---|---|
| 1st place, gold medalist(s) | Chinette Karina Lauridsen | Germany | 1:06.99 |
| 2nd place, silver medalist(s) | Viktoryia Shablova | Italy | 1:12.63 |
| 3rd place, bronze medalist(s) | Monika Seryu | Japan | 1:19.15 |
| 4 | Pooja Ojha | India | 1:22.67 |
| 5 | Lillemor Köper | Germany | 1:24.46 |
| 6 | Jocelyn Muñoz | Chile | 1:26.22 |
