= Iulian Șerban =

Romanian paracanoeist (1985–2021)

Medal record

Men's paracanoe

Representing Romania

World Championships
Gold medal – first place	2010 Poznań	K-1 LTA
Gold medal – first place	2011 Szeged	K-1 LTA
Gold medal – first place	2012 Poznań	K-1 LTA
Silver medal – second place	2013 Duisburg	K-1 LTA
Silver medal – second place	2014 Moscow	K-1 LTA

Iulian Șerban (25 February 1985 – 6 January 2021) was a Romanian paracanoeist who competed from the late 2000s onwards. He was a three time world champion, five time European champion and the first Romanian man to compete in canoeing in the Paralympics. He competed at the 2016 Summer Paralympics in Rio de Janeiro, where he placed fourth.

== Biography ==
=== Early life ===
Șerban was born in Olănești, Vâlcea County. He grew up with his mother and brother in Colentina, after his father died when he was 11 years old. He began canoeing in 1998 after following his mother and brother into the sport, who were both national champions. He would continue canoeing in his youth, before leaving the sport aged 19 to pursue work.

=== Injury ===
In May 2006, he was rushing to catch a train at Bușteni station when he fell under the wheels, losing his right leg and suffering multiple injuries. Șerban was 21 years old. He would spend over seven months in bed enduring 20 operations.

=== Return to canoe ===
After recovery, Șerban turned back to the water and to canoeing. He would be the first Romanian male paralympic canoeist. In 2010, the first European and World Championship events in paracanoe were introduced. Șerban would go on to win a gold medal in the K-1 200 m LTA event at the 2010 ICF Canoe Sprint World Championships in Poznań. He would defend his title in 2011 and in 2012. In 2013, he won his fourth gold medal at the European Kayak-Canoe Championships in Montemo-o-Velho.

He became the first Romanian male canoeist to compete at the Paralympics when he participated in the 2016 Summer Paralympic games in Rio de Janeiro. He would eventually place fourth at the Rio games. After the Olympics, in 2017, Șerban placed 12th at the world championships and sixth at the European championships.

=== Death ===
Șerban died in Bucharest at the age of 35 on 6 January 2021. The cause of death was not disclosed. His death was announced by his paddling club, Club Steaua Bucharest.

In April 2021, Şerban's Olympic canoe and his world championships canoes were stolen from a boathouse partly owned by Mihaela Lulea.

== See also ==
- Mihaela Lulea, Șerban's close friend and fellow Romanian paracanoeist.
