= 2024 ICF Paracanoe World Championships – Women's VL1 =

Women's VL1 at the 2024 ICF Paracanoe World Championships
- Venue: Olympic Centre of Szeged
- Location: Szeged, Hungary
- Dates: 10 May
- Competitors: 4 from 4 nations
- Winning time: 1:19.15

Medalists
gold medal	Viktoryia Pistis Shablova	Italy
silver medal	Pooja Ojha	India
bronze medal	Jocelyn Muñoz	Chile

The women's VL1 competition at the 2024 ICF Paracanoe World Championships in Szeged took place at the Olympic Centre of Szeged.

== Schedule ==
The schedule was as follows:

Date	Time	Round
Friday 10 May 2024	11:06	Final

All times are Central European Summer Time (UTC+2)

== Results ==
With fewer than ten competitors entered, this event was held as a direct final.

Rank	Name	Country	Time
1st place, gold medalist(s)	Viktoryia Pistis Shablova	Italy	1:19.15
2nd place, silver medalist(s)	Pooja Ojha	India	1:24.51
3rd place, bronze medalist(s)	Jocelyn Muñoz	Chile	1:26.06
4	Lillemor Köper	Germany	1:31.61
