= 2026 ICF Canoe Sprint World Championships – Women's VL1 =

Women's VL1 at the 2026 ICF Canoe Sprint World Championships
- Venue: Lake Malta
- Location: Poznań, Poland
- Dates: 28 August
- Competitors: 9 from 9 nations
- Winning time: 1:14.79

Medalists
gold medal	Aleksandra Dupik	Individual Neutral Athletes
silver medal	Viktoryia Shablova	Italy
bronze medal	Monika Seryu	Japan

The women's VL1 competition at the 2026 ICF Canoe Sprint World Championships in Poznań took place at Lake Malta.

== Schedule ==
The schedule is as follows:

Date	Time	Round
Friday 28 August 2026	15:53	Final

=== Results ===
With fewer than ten competitors entered, this event was held as a direct final.

Rank	Lane	Name	Nation	Time	Gap
1st place, gold medalist(s)	7	Aleksandra Dupik	Individual Neutral Athletes-A	1:14.79	
2nd place, silver medalist(s)	5	Viktoryia Shablova	Italy	1:17.49	+2.60
3rd place, bronze medalist(s)	4	Monika Seryu	Japan	1:20.86	+6.07
4	8	Reka Baranyai	Hungary	1:22.01	+7.22
5	2	Saffron Cresswell	Great Britain	1:27.03	+12.24
6	6	Pooja Ojha	India	1:32.14	+17.35
7	3	Lillemor Köper	Germany	1:39.83	+25.04
8	9	Farida Abduraimova	Uzbekistan	1:53.04	+38.25
9	1	Marzhan Bilyalova	Kazakhstan	2:06.98	+52.19
