= Duško Stanojević =

Serbian canoeist

Medal record

Men's canoe sprint

Representing Serbia

World Championships
| Bronze medal – third place | 2010 Poznań | K-2 500 m |

European Championships
| Silver medal – second place | 2012 Zagreb | K-2 500 m |

Mediterranean Games
| Bronze medal – third place | 2009 Pescara | K-2 1000 m |

Duško Stanojević (born 7 November 1984 in Šabac) is a Serbian sprint canoer who has competed since the late 2000s. At the 2010 ICF Canoe Sprint World Championships in Poznań, he and Dejan Pajić won a bronze medal in the men's K-2 500m event.
