= Christine Selinger =

Canadian paracanoeist

Medal record

Women's paracanoe

Representing Canada

World Championships
Gold medal – first place	2010 Poznań	V-1 200 m LTA, TA, A
Gold medal – first place	2011 Szeged	V-1 200m LTA
Silver medal – second place	2010 Poznań	K-1 200 m TA
Silver medal – second place	2011 Szeged	K-1 200m TA
Silver medal – second place	2012 Poznan	V-1 200m TA
Bronze medal – third place	2009 Dartmouth	K-2 200 m, mixed, TA, A
Bronze medal – third place	2012 Poznan	V-1 200m LTA
Bronze medal – third place	2012 Poznan	K-1 200m TA

Christine Selinger is a Canadian paracanoeist who has competed since the late 2000s.

== Career ==
She won her first international medal at the 2009 ICF Canoe Sprint World Championships, then subsequently won two medals at the 2010 ICF Canoe Sprint World Championships in Poznań with a gold in the V-1 200 m LTA and a silver in the K-1 200 m TA events. At the 2011 ICF Canoe Sprint World Championships in Szeged she repeated her 2010 performance with a gold in the V-1 200m LTA and a second-place finish in the K-1 200m TA event.

Christine Selinger is also an adventure enthusiast who became the first paraplegic to traverse the Nootka Trail (located on Nootka Island in British Columbia, Canada) in May 2010. The expedition was referred to in the media as "Nootka No Limits".

Selinger became a paraplegic in late 2006 after a rappelling incident in Savona, BC.
