= 2016 ICF Paracanoe World Championships – Women's VL1 =

Women's VL1 at the 2016 ICF Paracanoe World Championships
- Location: Duisburg, Germany
- Dates: 19 May
- Competitors: 4 from 3 nations
- Winning time: 1:18.730

Medalists
gold medal	Ann Yoshida	United States
silver medal	Akiko Nakajima	Japan
bronze medal	Monika Seryu	Japan

The women's VL1 competition at the 2016 ICF Paracanoe World Championships took place in Duisburg.

== Schedule ==
The schedule was as follows:

Date	Time	Round
Thursday 19 May 2016	14:35	Final

All times are Central European Summer Time (UTC+2)

== Results ==
With fewer than ten competitors entered, this event was held as a direct final.

Rank	Name	Country	Time
1st place, gold medalist(s)	Ann Yoshida	United States	1:18.730
2nd place, silver medalist(s)	Akiko Nakajima	Japan	1:20.718
3rd place, bronze medalist(s)	Monika Seryu	Japan	1:26.215
4	Silvana Santos Ferreira	Brazil	1:33.821
