= Paolo Bressi =

Italian powerlifter

Medal record

Men's paracanoe

World Championships
Silver medal – second place	2010 Poznań	K-1 200 m TA

Paolo Bressi (born 25 July 1987) is an Italian powerlifter and a former paracanoeist who has competed since the late 2000s. He won a silver medal in the K-1 200 m TA event at the 2010 ICF Canoe Sprint World Championships in Poznań.
