= 2026 ICF Canoe Sprint World Championships – Men's VL1 =

Men's VL1 at the 2026 ICF Canoe Sprint World Championships
- Venue: Lake Malta
- Location: Poznań, Poland
- Dates: 26–28 August
- Winning time: 1:04.65

Medalists
gold medal	Benjamin Sainsbury	Australia
silver medal	Ilya Taupianets	Individual Neutral Athletes
bronze medal	Artur Chuprov	Individual Neutral Athletes

The men's VL1 competition at the 2026 ICF Canoe Sprint World Championships in Poznań took place at Lake Malta.

== Schedule ==
The schedule is as follows:

Date	Time	Round
Wednesday 26 August 2026	17:04	Heats
Friday 28 August 2026	09:00	Semifinals
Friday 28 August 2026	10:40	Final A

=== Finals ===
Competitors raced for positions 1 to 9, with medals going to the top three.

Rank	Lane	Name	Nation	Time	Gap
1st place, gold medalist(s)	6	Benjamin Sainsbury	Australia	1:04.65	
2nd place, silver medalist(s)	5	Ilya Taupianets	Individual Neutral Athletes-B	1:04.87	+0.22
3rd place, bronze medalist(s)	4	Artur Chuprov	Individual Neutral Athletes-A	1:05.74	+1.09
4	8	Thomas Price	Great Britain	1:09.69	+5.04
5	7	Moritz Berthold	Germany	1:09.83	+5.18
6	2	David González	Spain	1:10.50	+5.85
7	1	Maxim Bogatyrev	Kazakhstan	1:11.74	+7.09
8	9	Yuta Takagi	Japan	1:12.66	+8.01
9	3	Lorenzo Lodola	Italy	1:12.96	+8.31
