= Fernando Fernandes de Pádua =

Brazilian paracanoeist (born 1981)

Fernando Fernandes
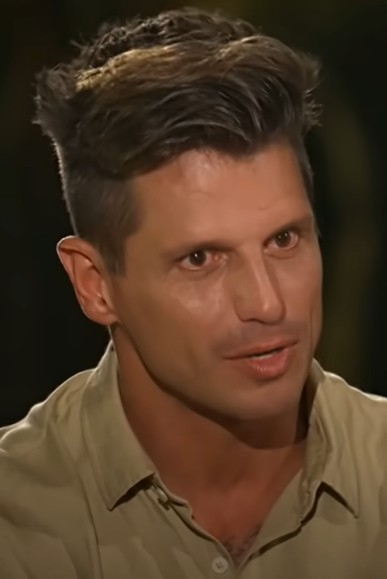
- Fernandes in 2022

Personal information
- Full name: Fernando Fernandes de Pádua
- Born: 28 March 1981 (age 45) São Paulo, Brazil

Sport
- Sport: Paracanoe
Medal record
Men's paracanoe
Representing Brazil
ICF Canoe Sprint World Championships
Gold medal – first place	2010 Poznań	K-1 200 m A
Gold medal – first place	2011 Szeged	K-1 200 m A
Gold medal – first place	2013 Duisburg	K-1 200 m A
Bronze medal – third place	2015 Milan	K-1 200 m KL1

Fernando Fernandes de Pádua is a Brazilian paracanoeist and fashion model who has competed since the late 2000s. He won a gold medal in the K-1 200 m A event at the 2010 ICF Canoe Sprint World Championships in Poznań and one year later at the 2011 ICF Canoe Sprint World Championships in Szeged.

== Filmography ==
Year	Title	Role	Notes
2002	Big Brother Brasil 2	Contestant (10th place)	
2012	Esporte Espetacular	Host	Desafio sem Limites
2012	Boletim Paralímpico	Host	Paralympic Games (London 2012)
2016	Boletim Paralímpico	Host	Paralympic Games (Rio 2016)
2017	Esporte Espetacular	Host	Sobre Rodas
2018	Além dos Limites	Host	Canal Off
2021	Boletim Paralímpico	Host	Paralympic Games (Tokyo 2020)
2022	Além do Caminhos do Vento	Host	Canal Off
2022–2023	No Limite	Host	TV presenter - Season 6
2022–2023	No Limite – A Eliminação	Host	TV presenter - Season 6
2023	The Masked Singer Brasil 3	Contestant (11th place - Circus)	
2025	BBB: O Documentário	Himself	
