= 2021 ICF Canoe Sprint World Championships – Women's VL1 =

Women's VL1 at the 2021 ICF Canoe Sprint World Championships
- Venue: Lake Bagsværd
- Location: Copenhagen, Denmark
- Dates: 16 September
- Competitors: 4 from 3 nations
- Winning time: 1:24.32

Medalists
gold medal	Lillemor Köper	Germany
silver medal	Esther Bode	Germany
bronze medal	Céline Brulais	France

The women's VL1 competition at the 2021 ICF Canoe Sprint World Championships in Copenhagen took place on Lake Bagsværd.

== Schedule ==
The schedule was as follows:

Date	Time	Round
Thursday 16 September 2021	17:45	Final

All times are Central European Summer Time (UTC+2)

== Results ==
With fewer than ten competitors entered, this event was held as a direct final.

Rank	Name	Country	Time
1st place, gold medalist(s)	Lillemor Köper	Germany	1:24.32
2nd place, silver medalist(s)	Esther Bode	Germany	1:36.22
3rd place, bronze medalist(s)	Céline Brulais	France	1:42.18
4	Andrea Bracamonte	Argentina	1:53.98
