= 2025 ICF Canoe Sprint World Championships – Men's VL1 =

Men's VL1 at the 2025 ICF Canoe Sprint World Championships
- Venue: Idroscalo Regatta Course
- Location: Milan, Italy
- Dates: 20–23 August
- Competitors: 14 from 12 nations
- Winning time: 58.86

Medalists
gold medal	Ilya Taupianets	Individual Neutral Athletes
silver medal	Benjamin Sainsbury	Australia
bronze medal	Artur Chuprov	Individual Neutral Athletes

The men's VL1 200 metres competition at the 2025 ICF Canoe Sprint World Championships in Milan took place in Idroscalo Regatta Course.

== Schedule ==
The schedule is as follows:

Date	Time	Round
Wednesday 20 August 2025	15:38	Heats
Friday 22 August 2025	09:00	Semifinals
Friday 22 August 2025	15:52	Final

== Results ==
=== Heats ===
The fastest three boats in each heat advanced directly to the final (QF). The next four fastest boats in each heat, plus the fastest remaining boat advanced to the semifinal (QS).

==== Heat 1 ====
Rank	Canoeist	Country	Time	Notes
1	Ilya Taupianets	Individual Neutral Athletes	1:02.57	QF
2	Moritz Berthold	Germany	1:03.47	QF
3	David González	Spain	1:07.73	QF
4	Yash Kumar	India	1:09.87	QS
5	Maxim Bogatyrev	Kazakhstan	1:12.27	QS
6	Thomas Price	Great Britain	1:14.98	QS
7	Katsuya Shimono	Japan	1:20.45	QS

==== Heat 2 ====
Rank	Canoeist	Country	Time	Notes
1	Artur Chuprov	Individual Neutral Athletes	1:00.43	QF
2	Benjamin Sainsbury	Australia	1:00.52	QF
3	Carlos Glenndel Moreira	Brazil	1:04.68	QF
4	Yuta Takagi	Japan	1:04.73	QS
5	Alessio Bedin	Italy	1:11.68	QS
6	Corentin Denys	France	1:12.39	QS
7	Manish Yadav	India	1:21.21	QS

=== Semifinal ===
The fastest three boats advanced to the final.

Rank	Canoeist	Country	Time	Notes
1	Yuta Takagi	Japan	1:07.82	QF
2	Thomas Price	Great Britain	1:11.62	QF
3	Maxim Bogatyrev	Kazakhstan	1:12.41	QF
4	Alessio Bedin	Italy	1:12.63	
5	Corentin Denys	France	1:13.29	
6	Yash Kumar	India	1:14.85	
7	Manish Yadav	India	1:16.50	
8	Katsuya Shimono	Japan	1:16.61	

=== Final ===
Competitors raced for positions 1 to 9, with medals going to the top three.

Rank	Canoeist	Country	Time	Notes
1st place, gold medalist(s)	Ilya Taupianets	Individual Neutral Athletes	58.86	
2nd place, silver medalist(s)	Benjamin Sainsbury	Australia	1:01.79	
3rd place, bronze medalist(s)	Artur Chuprov	Individual Neutral Athletes	1:01.86	
4	Moritz Berthold	Germany	1:04.58	
5	Yuta Takagi	Japan	1:04.70	
6	Carlos Glenndel Moreira	Brazil	1:05.19	
7	David González	Spain	1:10.36	
8	Thomas Price	Great Britain	1:12.07	
9	Maxim Bogatyrev	Kazakhstan	1:13.38	
