= 2023 ICF Canoe Sprint World Championships – Men's VL1 =

Men's VL1 at the 2023 ICF Canoe Sprint World Championships
- Venue: Sportpark Duisburg
- Location: Duisburg, Germany
- Dates: 24–25 August
- Competitors: 10 from 9 nations
- Winning time: 1:02.735

Medalists
gold medal	Benjamin Sainsbury	Australia
silver medal	David González	Spain
bronze medal	Carlos Glenndel Moreira	Brazil

The men's VL1 competition at the 2023 ICF Canoe Sprint World Championships in Duisburg took place at Sportpark Duisburg.

== Schedule ==
The schedule was as follows:

Date	Time	Round
Thursday 24 August 2023	12:05	Heats
Thursday 24 August 2023	15:35	Semifinal
Friday 25 August 2023	14:35	Final

All times are Central European Summer Time (UTC+2)

== Results ==
=== Heats ===
The fastest three boats in each heat advanced directly to the final.
The next four fastest boats in each heat, plus the fastest remaining boat advanced to the semifinal.

==== Heat 1 ====
Rank	Name	Country	Time	Notes
1	Benjamin Sainsbury	Australia	1:01.935	QF
2	David González	Spain	1:05.008	QF
3	Surender Kumar	India	1:06.390	QF
4	Carlos Glenndel Moreira	Brazil	1:06.817	QS
5	Benjamin Brown	Canada	1:12.932	QS

==== Heat 2 ====
Rank	Name	Country	Time	Notes
1	Peter Happ	Germany	1:06.603	QF
2	Robinson Mendez	Chile	1:07.070	QF
3	Alessio Bedin	Italy	1:07.918	QF
4	Maxim Bogatyrev	Kazakhstan	1:11.805	QS
5	Yash Kumar	India	1:13.762	QS

=== Semifinal ===
The fastest three boats advanced to the final.

Rank	Name	Country	Time	Notes
1	Carlos Glenndel Moreira	Brazil	1:06.920	QF
2	Benjamin Brown	Canada	1:12.020	QF
3	Maxim Bogatyrev	Kazakhstan	1:13.148	QF
4	Yash Kumar	India	1:13.688	

=== Final ===
Competitors raced for positions 1 to 9, with medals going to the top three.

Rank	Name	Country	Time
1st place, gold medalist(s)	Benjamin Sainsbury	Australia	1:02.735
2nd place, silver medalist(s)	David González	Spain	1:05.932
3rd place, bronze medalist(s)	Carlos Glenndel Moreira	Brazil	1:06.086
4	Surender Kumar	India	1:06.221
5	Peter Happ	Germany	1:07.587
6	Alessio Bedin	Italy	1:10.342
7	Maxim Bogatyrev	Kazakhstan	1:11.876
8	Robinson Mendez	Chile	1:12.279
9	Benjamin Brown	Canada	1:12.458
