= 2018 ICF Canoe Sprint World Championships – Women's VL1 =

Women's VL1 at the 2018 ICF Canoe Sprint World Championships
- Venue: Centro de Alto Rendimento de Montemor-o-Velho
- Location: Montemor-o-Velho, Portugal
- Dates: 22 August
- Competitors: 1 from 1 nation
- Winning time: 1:14.942

Medalists
gold medal	Monika Seryu	Japan

The women's VL1 competition at the 2018 ICF Canoe Sprint World Championships in Montemor-o-Velho took place at the Centro de Alto Rendimento de Montemor-o-Velho.

== Schedule ==
The schedule was as follows:

Date	Time	Round
Wednesday 22 August 2018	17:45	Final

All times are Western European Summer Time (UTC+1)

== Results ==
With fewer than ten competitors entered, this event was held as a direct final.

Rank	Name	Country	Time
1st place, gold medalist(s)	Monika Seryu	Japan	1:14.942
