= Andrea Testa =

Italian paracanoeist

Medal record

Men's paracanoe

Representing Italy

ICF Canoe Sprint World Championships
Bronze medal – third place	2010 Poznań	K-1 200 m LTA
Silver medal – second place	2011 Szeged	K-1 200 m LTA

Andrea Testa is an Italian paracanoeist who has competed since the late 2000s. He won a silver medal in the K-1 200 m LTA event at the 2010 ICF Canoe Sprint World Championships in Poznań.
