= 2019 ICF Canoe Sprint World Championships – Women's VL1 =

Women's VL1 at the 2019 ICF Canoe Sprint World Championships
- Venue: Olympic Centre of Szeged
- Location: Szeged, Hungary
- Dates: 21 August
- Competitors: 2 from 2 nations
- Winning time: 1:14.56

Medalists
gold medal	Monika Seryu	Japan
silver medal	Esther Bode	Germany

The women's VL1 competition at the 2019 ICF Canoe Sprint World Championships in Szeged took place at the Olympic Centre of Szeged.

== Schedule ==
The schedule was as follows:

Date	Time	Round
Wednesday 21 August 2019	18:10	Final

All times are Central European Summer Time (UTC+2)

== Results ==
With fewer than ten competitors entered, this event was held as a direct final.

Rank	Name	Country	Time
1st place, gold medalist(s)	Monika Seryu	Japan	1:14.56
2nd place, silver medalist(s)	Esther Bode	Germany	1:35.66
