= 2022 ICF Canoe Sprint World Championships – Men's VL1 =

Men's VL1 at the 2022 ICF Canoe Sprint World Championships
- Venue: Lake Banook
- Location: Dartmouth, Canada
- Dates: 3 August
- Competitors: 8 from 7 nations
- Winning time: 1:04.80

Medalists
gold medal	Benjamin Sainsbury	Australia
silver medal	Alessio Bedin	Italy
bronze medal	Robinson Mendez	Chile

The men's VL1 competition at the 2022 ICF Canoe Sprint World Championships in Dartmouth took place on Lake Banook.

== Schedule ==
The schedule was as follows:

Date	Time	Round
Wednesday 3 August 2022	16:58	Final

All times are Atlantic Daylight Time (UTC−3)

== Results ==
With fewer than ten competitors entered, this event was held as a direct final.

Rank	Name	Country	Time
1st place, gold medalist(s)	Benjamin Sainsbury	Australia	1:10.25
2nd place, silver medalist(s)	Alessio Bedin	Italy	1:12.54
3rd place, bronze medalist(s)	Robinson Méndez	Chile	1:14.74
4	Benjamin Brown	Canada	1:18.85
5	Surender Kumar	India	1:22.97
6	Barry McKeown	United States	1:25.29
7	Vadim Kin	United States	1:30.90
8	Miguel Sanchez	Canada	1:33.57
