= Lorella Bellato =

Italian paracanoer

Medal record

Women's paracanoe

World Championships
Bronze medal – third place	2010 Poznań	V-1 200 m LTA, TA, A

Lorella Bellato is an Italian paracanoer who has competed since the late 2000s. She won a bronze medal in the V-1 200 m LTA, TA, an event at the 2010 ICF Canoe Sprint World Championships in Poznań.
