= Patrick Viriamu =

Tahitian paracanoeist

Medal record

Representing Tahiti

Men's Paracanoe

World Championships
Gold medal – first place	2010 Poznań	V-1 200 m LTA, TA, A
Silver medal – second place	2013 Duisburg	V-1 200 m LTA

Patrick Viriamu is a Tahitian paracanoeist from French Polynesia who has competed since the late 2000s. He won a gold medal in the V-1 200 m LTA, TA, A event at the 2010 ICF Canoe Sprint World Championships in Poznań.
