= 2017 ICF Canoe Sprint World Championships – Men's VL3 =

Men's VL3 at the 2017 ICF Canoe Sprint World Championships
- Venue: Sportcentrum Račice
- Location: Račice, Czech Republic
- Dates: 23–25 August
- Competitors: 18 from 14 nations
- Winning time: 48.768

Medalists
gold medal	Jonathan Young	Great Britain
silver medal	Caio Ribeiro de Carvalho	Brazil
bronze medal	Martin Tweedie	Great Britain

The men's VL3 competition at the 2017 ICF Canoe Sprint World Championships in Račice took place at the Sportcentrum Račice.

== Schedule ==
The schedule was as follows:

Date	Time	Round
Wednesday 23 August 2017	13:00	Heats
Wednesday 23 August 2017	14:15	Semifinal
Friday 25 August 2017	15:45	Final

All times are Central European Summer Time (UTC+2)

== Results ==
=== Heats ===
The fastest three boats in each heat advanced directly to the final. The next four fastest boats in each heat, plus the fastest remaining boat advanced to the semifinal.

==== Heat 1 ====
Rank	Name	Country	Time	Notes
1	Jonathan Young	Great Britain	50.646	QF
2	Caio Ribeiro de Carvalho	Brazil	51.946	QF
3	Victor Potanin	Russia	52.563	QF
4	Vladyslav Yepifanov	Ukraine	53.468	QS
5	Giuseppe di Gaetano	Italy	57.496	QS
6	Gregory Crouse	United States	58.957	QS
7	Juan Antonio Valle	Spain	1:01.646	QS
8	Anuj Singh	India	1:01.885	
9	Miho Hamada	Japan	1:14.457	

==== Heat 2 ====
Rank	Name	Country	Time	Notes
1	Khaytmurot Sherkuziev	Uzbekistan	49.421	QF
2	Martin Tweedie	Great Britain	49.976	QF
3	Aleksei Egorov	Russia	51.215	QF
4	Otabek Kuchkorov	Uzbekistan	51.371	QS
5	Tomasz Moździerski	Poland	52.871	QS
6	Ronan Bernard	France	55.687	QS
7	Henrik Emanuelsson	Sweden	55.732	QS
8	Matías Passarello	Argentina	55.865	qS
9	Adrián Mosquera	Spain	1:08.387	

=== Semifinal ===
The fastest three boats advanced to the final.

Rank	Name	Country	Time	Notes
1	Otabek Kuchkorov	Uzbekistan	51.810	QF
2	Vladyslav Yepifanov	Ukraine	53.143	QF
3	Tomasz Moździerski	Poland	53.621	QF
4	Ronan Bernard	France	54.860	
5	Matías Passarello	Argentina	56.310	
6	Juan Antonio Valle	Spain	56.382	
7	Henrik Emanuelsson	Sweden	56.615	
8	Gregory Crouse	United States	57.360	
9	Giuseppe di Gaetano	Italy	57.438	

=== Final ===
Competitors raced for positions 1 to 9, with medals going to the top three.

Rank	Name	Country	Time
1st place, gold medalist(s)	Jonathan Young	Great Britain	48.769
2nd place, silver medalist(s)	Caio Ribeiro de Carvalho	Brazil	49.330
3rd place, bronze medalist(s)	Martin Tweedie	Great Britain	50.958
4	Otabek Kuchkorov	Uzbekistan	51.296
5	Aleksei Egorov	Russia	51.413
6	Victor Potanin	Russia	52.196
7	Khaytmurot Sherkuziev	Uzbekistan	52.302
8	Vladyslav Yepifanov	Ukraine	52.902
–	Tomasz Moździerski	Poland	DSQ (Note: Tomasz Moździerski was disqualified for violating ICF rule 23.2)
