= 2019 ICF Canoe Sprint World Championships – Men's VL1 =

Men's VL1 at the 2019 ICF Canoe Sprint World Championships
- Venue: Olympic Centre of Szeged
- Location: Szeged, Hungary
- Dates: 21 August
- Competitors: 5 from 5 nations
- Winning time: 1:05.18

Medalists
gold medal	Mykola Fedorenko	Ukraine
silver medal	Peter Happ	Germany
bronze medal	Robinson Méndez	Chile

The men's VL1 competition at the 2019 ICF Canoe Sprint World Championships in Szeged took place at the Olympic Centre of Szeged.

== Schedule ==
The schedule was as follows:

Date	Time	Round
Wednesday 21 August 2019	18:24	Final

All times are Central European Summer Time (UTC+2)

== Results ==
With fewer than ten competitors entered, this event was held as a direct final.

Rank	Name	Country	Time
1st place, gold medalist(s)	Mykola Fedorenko	Ukraine	1:05.18
2nd place, silver medalist(s)	Peter Happ	Germany	1:07.81
3rd place, bronze medalist(s)	Robinson Méndez	Chile	1:14.27
4	Vadim Kin	United States	1:18.28
5	Yash Kumar	India	1:34.67
