= Kara Kennedy (canoeist) =

Australian paracanoeist (born 1973)

Personal information
- Nationality: Australia
- Born: 6 August 1973 (age 53)
Medal record
Paracanoe
ICF Canoe Sprint World Championships
Silver medal – second place	2014 Dusiburg	Women's V1 200 m
Silver medal – second place	2014 Moscow	Women's V1 200 m

Kara Kennedy (born 6 August 1973) is an Australian paracanoeist who has won silver medals at the 2013 and 2014 ICF Canoe Sprint World Championships.

== Personal ==
Kennedy was born on 6 August 1973 and has spinocerebellar ataxia and has lost the eyesight in her right eye. She wears a brace on her legs to stop hyperextension. Kennedy lives on the Gold Coast, Queensland.

== Sporting career ==
Kennedy is classified as a TA (Trunk and arms) paracanoeist. She originally paddled in 6 man outriggers for approximately two years. In February 2011, she paddled in a kayak for the first time. In 2012, she was the Oceania Champion in K1 200 m, 500 m and 1000 m and V1 200 m, 500 m and 1000 m events. At the 2013 ICF Canoe Sprint World Championships in Duisburg, Germany she won the silver medal in the V1 A 200 m and placed fourth in V1 200 TA and K1 200m A events. At the 2014 ICF Canoe Sprint World Championships in Moscow, Russia, she won the silver medal in V1 200 m A and placed sixth in V1 200 m TA. She is coached by Andrea Wood, the Australian Paracanoe Head Coach.

== Recognition ==
- 2012 - Australian Paracanoeist of the Year
- 2013 - Australian Paracanoeist of the Year
