= 2018 ICF Canoe Sprint World Championships – Men's VL1 =

Men's VL1 at the 2018 ICF Canoe Sprint World Championships
- Venue: Centro de Alto Rendimento de Montemor-o-Velho
- Location: Montemor-o-Velho, Portugal
- Dates: 22 August
- Competitors: 2 from 2 nations
- Winning time: 1:18.764

Medalists
gold medal	Peter Happ	Germany
silver medal	Robinson Méndez	Chile

The men's VL1 competition at the 2018 ICF Canoe Sprint World Championships in Montemor-o-Velho took place at the Centro de Alto Rendimento de Montemor-o-Velho.

== Schedule ==
The schedule was as follows:

Date	Time	Round
Wednesday 22 August 2018	17:55	Final

All times are Western European Summer Time (UTC+1)

== Results ==
With fewer than ten competitors entered, this event was held as a direct final.

Rank	Name	Country	Time
1st place, gold medalist(s)	Peter Happ	Germany	1:18.764
2nd place, silver medalist(s)	Robinson Méndez	Chile	1:34.300
