= 2024 ICF Paracanoe World Championships – Men's VL1 =

Men's VL1 at the 2024 ICF Paracanoe World Championships
- Venue: Olympic Centre of Szeged
- Location: Szeged, Hungary
- Dates: 11 May
- Competitors: 8 from 7 nations
- Winning time: 1:06.89

Medalists
gold medal	David González	Spain
silver medal	Carlos Glenndel Moreira	Brazil
bronze medal	Yuta Takagi	Japan

The men's VL1 competition at the 2024 ICF Paracanoe World Championships in Szeged took place at the Olympic Centre of Szeged.

== Schedule ==
The schedule was as follows:

Date	Time	Round
Saturday 11 May 2024	11:04	Final

All times are Central European Summer Time (UTC+2)

== Results ==
With fewer than ten competitors entered, this event was held as a direct final.

Rank	Name	Country	Time
1st place, gold medalist(s)	David González	Spain	1:06.89
2nd place, silver medalist(s)	Carlos Glenndel Moreira	Brazil	1:07.15
3rd place, bronze medalist(s)	Yuta Takagi	Japan	1:07.60
4	Moritz Berthold	Germany	1:09.71
5	Yash Kumar	India	1:10.02
6	Alessio Bedin	Italy	1:15.57
7	Tetsuya Sekine	Japan	1:53.40
	Maxim Bogatyrev	Kazakhstan	DNS
