= Li Tiantian =

Chinese sprint canoer

Medal record

Women's canoe sprint

World Championships
Silver medal – second place	2010 Poznań	C-1 200 m

Li Tiantian (李甜甜) is a hinese canoe sprinter who has competed since the late 2000s. She won the silver medal in the C-1 200 m event at the 2010 ICF Canoe Sprint World Championships in Poznań.
