= Ann Yoshida =

American paracanoeist

Personal information
- Full name: Ann Hamanalau Yoshida
- Born: October 10, 1977 (age 48) Mililani, Hawaii, U.S.
- Home town: Mililani, Hawaii
- Education: Pacific University; Utah State University; University of Hawaii; Brigham Young University
- Height: 5 ft 6 in (168 cm)
- Weight: 160 lb (73 kg)

Sport
- Country: United States
- Sport: Paracanoe
- Disability: Paraplegia
- Club: Accessurf Hawaii
- Coached by: Stephen Knight
Medal record
Women's paracanoe
Representing United States
World Championships
Gold medal – first place	2016 Duisburg	VL1
Silver medal – second place	2015 Milan	VL1
Bronze medal – third place	2013 Duisburg	VL1

Ann Hamanalau Yoshida (born October 10, 1977) is an American paracanoeist who competes in international level events. As well as canoeing, she is an occupational therapist.

== Personal life ==
In 2000, Yoshida was paralysed from the chest down due to an accident in Utah when a truck went through a red light and hit her car. She had a brain injury and a ruptured aorta and was put into a medically induced coma to recover fully.
