= 2016 ICF Paracanoe World Championships – Men's VL3 =

Men's VL3 at the 2016 ICF Paracanoe World Championships
- Location: Duisburg, Germany
- Dates: 17–19 May
- Competitors: 13 from 10 nations
- Winning time: 51.473

Medalists
gold medal	Pier Alberto Buccoliero	Italy
silver medal	Aleksei Egorov	Russia
bronze medal	Martin Tweedie	Great Britain

The men's VL3 competition at the 2016 ICF Paracanoe World Championships took place in Duisburg.

== Schedule ==
The schedule was as follows:

Date	Time	Round
Tuesday 17 May 2016	16:10	Heats
Wednesday 18 May 2016	15:55	Semifinal
Thursday 19 May 2016	14:50	Final

All times are Central European Summer Time (UTC+2)

== Results ==
=== Heats ===
The fastest three boats in each heat advanced directly to the final. The next four fastest boats in each heat, plus the fastest remaining boat advanced to the semifinal.

==== Heat 1 ====
Rank	Name	Country	Time	Notes
1	Pier Alberto Buccoliero	Italy	53.219	QF
2	Caio Ribeiro de Carvalho	Brazil	54.860	QF
3	Victor Potanin	Russia	55.902	QF
4	Jamey Parks	United States	56.254	QS
5	Anuj Singh	India	1:03.759	QS
6	Garik Pilosyan	Armenia	1:04.323	QS
–	Tomasz Moździerski	Poland	DNF	

==== Heat 2 ====
Rank	Name	Country	Time	Notes
1	Aleksei Egorov	Russia	54.574	QF
2	Martin Tweedie	Great Britain	54.853	QF
3	Mirosław Rosiński	Poland	56.614	QF
4	Maik Polte	Germany	59.882	QS
5	Henrik Emanuelsson	Sweden	1:00.515	QS
–	Nitin Kumar Chandra	India	DNS	

=== Semifinal ===
The fastest three boats advanced to the final.

Rank	Name	Country	Time	Notes
1	Jamey Parks	United States	52.028	QF
2	Maik Polte	Germany	56.377	QF
3	Henrik Emanuelsson	Sweden	57.511	QF
4	Anuj Singh	India	59.591	
5	Garik Pilosyan	Armenia	1:02.619	

=== Final ===
Competitors raced for positions 1 to 9, with medals going to the top three.

Rank	Name	Country	Time
1st place, gold medalist(s)	Pier Alberto Buccoliero	Italy	51.473
2nd place, silver medalist(s)	Aleksei Egorov	Russia	52.086
3rd place, bronze medalist(s)	Martin Tweedie	Great Britain	52.383
4	Caio Ribeiro de Carvalho	Brazil	52.511
5	Jamey Parks	United States	52.857
6	Mirosław Rosiński	Poland	54.481
7	Victor Potanin	Russia	54.634
8	Maik Polte	Germany	57.104
9	Henrik Emanuelsson	Sweden	57.524
