= 2021 ICF Canoe Sprint World Championships – Men's VL1 =

Men's VL1 at the 2021 ICF Canoe Sprint World Championships
- Venue: Lake Bagsværd
- Location: Copenhagen, Denmark
- Dates: 16 September
- Competitors: 7 from 7 nations
- Winning time: 1:04.80

Medalists
gold medal	Artur Chuprov	International Paralympic Committee
silver medal	Robinson Méndez	Chile
bronze medal	Alessio Bedin	Italy

The men's VL1 competition at the 2021 ICF Canoe Sprint World Championships in Copenhagen took place on Lake Bagsværd.

== Schedule ==
The schedule was as follows:

Date	Time	Round
Thursday 16 September 2021	17:55	Final

All times are Central European Summer Time (UTC+2)

== Results ==
With fewer than ten competitors entered, this event was held as a direct final.

Rank	Name	Country	Time
1st place, gold medalist(s)	Artur Chuprov	RCF	1:04.80
2nd place, silver medalist(s)	Robinson Méndez	Chile	1:15.69
3rd place, bronze medalist(s)	Alessio Bedin	Italy	1:16.40
4	Carlos Moreira	Brazil	1:19.07
5	Vadim Kin	United States	1:22.16
6	Tetsuya Sekine	Japan	1:54.65
–	Yash Kumar	India	DNS
