= 2016 ICF Paracanoe World Championships – Women's VL3 =

Women's VL3 at the 2016 ICF Paracanoe World Championships
- Location: Duisburg, Germany
- Dates: 19 May
- Competitors: 5 from 4 nations
- Winning time: 1:01.279

Medalists
gold medal	Aline Souza Lopes	Brazil
silver medal	Larisa Volik	Russia
bronze medal	Anja Pierce	United States

The women's VL3 competition at the 2016 ICF Paracanoe World Championships took place in Duisburg.

== Schedule ==
The schedule was as follows:

Date	Time	Round
Thursday 19 May 2016	15:00	Final

All times are Central European Summer Time (UTC+2)

== Results ==
With fewer than ten competitors entered, this event was held as a direct final.

Rank	Name	Country	Time
1st place, gold medalist(s)	Aline Souza Lopes	Brazil	1:01.279
2nd place, silver medalist(s)	Larisa Volik	Russia	1:01.544
3rd place, bronze medalist(s)	Anja Pierce	United States	1:03.258
4	Maria Calvo	Spain	1:07.171
5	Jana Mestre	Spain	1:12.273
