= Megan Blunk =

American wheelchair basketball player

Personal information
- Nationality: United States
- Born: September 12, 1989 (age 36) Tacoma, Washington
- Education: 2010, Tacoma Community College; B.A., M.A., University of Illinois at Urbana–Champaign
- Height: 5 ft 3 in (1.60 m)
- Weight: 115lb (52kg)
Medal record
Summer Paralympics
Wheelchair basketball
Gold medal – first place	2016 Summer Paralympics	Women's wheelchair basketball

Megan Blunk (born September 12, 1989) is an American wheelchair basketball player for the United States women's national wheelchair basketball team. She won a gold medal for Team USA during the 2016 Summer Paralympics.

== Early life ==
Blunk was born September 12, 1989, in Tacoma, Washington to parents Wendy Ricketts and David Blunk. After graduating from Peninsula High School in 2008, Blunk became paralyzed from the waist down due to a motorcycle crash. Following this, two of her friends committed suicide, which increased her depression. Despite this, Blunk accepted a placement at the University of Illinois at Urbana Champaign's women's wheelchair basketball team. It was during summer break from the University of Illinois that Blunk began para-canoeing at the Gig Harbor Canoe and Kayak Club.

== Career ==
In 2013, she competed with Team USA at the ParaCanoe World Championships, where she won two silver medals However, after qualifying for the final roster with the 2015 United States women's national wheelchair basketball team, she competed in the 2015 Parapan American Games, and later tried out for the United States para-canoe trials. With Team USA, Blunk helped take home a gold medal under coach Stephanie Wheeler.

Deciding to stick with basketball, Blunk helped Team USA win a gold medal at the 2016 Summer Paralympics by beating Germany 62–45 in the medal finals. In 2018, Blunk participated in former National Football League player Colin Kaepernick's viral Nike commercial.
