= 2010 ICF Canoe Sprint World Championships =

Canoe world championships

- Official logo for the 2010 ICF Canoe Sprint World Championships
- Host city: Poznań, Poland, on Lake Malta
- Dates: August 19–22, 2010

The 2010 ICF Canoe Sprint World Championships were held 19–22 August 2010 in Poznań, Poland, on Lake Malta. This was the third time that the Polish city hosted the championships, having done so previously in 1990 and 2001. Paracanoe (formerly paddleability) and the women's C-1 200 m events that were exhibition events at the previous world championships in Dartmouth, Nova Scotia, Canada, became official events at these championships.

Germany and Hungary won the most medals at the championships with twelve each though the Hungarians won six golds, the most of the championships, compared to the Germans' five golds. Brazil, Japan and Tahiti won their first ever championship medals. Ronald Rauhe of Germany became the winningest medalist in men's kayak with his 21st career medal, earning that in a K-1 200 m silver. Rauhe eclipsed that record he had tied at the previous championships with fellow German Torsten Gutsche. In women's kayak, Hungary's Katalin Kovács tied Germany's Birgit Fischer for most career medals with 38 with three medals earned though Kovács 29th gold passed Fischer's 28 career golds. For the first time since 1975, a tie occurred in the medals only this time it was for the bronze in the C-1 200 m event between Canada's Richard Dalton and Ukraine's Yuriy Cheban. Canada also won the first gold medal in women's canoe with Laurence Vincent-Lapointe winning gold. Paracanoe's big winners were Brazil and Canada with three medals each.

== Explanation of events ==
Canoe sprint competitions are broken up into Canadian canoe (C), an open canoe with a single-blade paddle, or in kayaks (K), a closed canoe with a double-bladed paddle. Each canoe or kayak can hold one person (1), two people (2), or four people (4). For each of the specific canoes or kayaks, such as a K-1 (kayak single), the competition distances can be 200 metres (660 ft), 500 metres (1,600 ft), or 1,000 metres (3,300 ft) long. When a competition is listed as a C-2 500 m event as an example, it means two people are in a canoe competing at a 500 metres (1,600 ft) distance.

== Preliminaries to the event ==
Poznań was awarded the 2010 championships at an ICF board of directors meeting in Madrid, Spain, on 23 October 2003.

=== Event format changes ===
At the 2009 ICF board of directors meeting in Windsor, Berkshire, England, women's C-1 200 m was added for these championships while women's C-2 500 m will remain a demonstration event like it had the previous championships. The relay events, started at the previous championships, and 5000 m events, included for the first time since their discontinuation after the 1993 championships in Copenhagen, will also occur. Paracanoe (formerly referred to as paddleability) will have four events covering three classifications with LTA (Legs, Trunk, and Arms), TA (Trunk and Arms), and A (Arms only). The events were confirmed following successes at the previous world championships on 18 December 2009. The schedule for the championships was released on 10 June 2010.

=== Visit from the ICF ===
During the week of 1 March 2010, the ICF visited Lake Malta to meet with the Host Organizing Committee (HOC) to see how event preparations were progressing. Some items discussed were broadcasting, event promotion, athlete services, and communications. 2.5 hours of live television coverage on a daily basis is planned for the semifinal and final event as provided in the contract to meet the needs of the European market. 61 million people watched last year's championships in Canada. ICF Secretary General Simon Toulson expressed his support of the HOC and his hope that the 2010 championships will be a good one.

== Event progress ==
After opening ceremonies on the 18th, the first round of events took place on the 19th with 1000 m events completing their heats and the semifinals. Paracanoe heats were suspended later that day to high winds and weather conditions.

== Participating nations ==
75 nations were listed on the preliminary entry list. The numbers in parentheses shown are for those who competed for each respective nation.

- Algeria (1)
- Angola (5)
- Argentina (6)
- Armenia (3)
- Australia (23)
- Austria (7)
- Azerbaijan (2)
- Belarus (24)
- Belgium (5)
- Brazil (13)
- Bulgaria (12)
- Canada (35)
- Chile (6)
- China (23)
- Cook Islands (1)
- Croatia (1)
- Cuba (5)
- Cyprus (1)
- Czech Republic (25)
- Denmark (8)
- Egypt (2)
- Estonia (7)
- Finland (6)
- France (17)
- Germany (33)
- Great Britain (28)
- Greece (4)
- Hungary (40)
- Iran (11)
- Ireland (2)
- Israel (3)
- Italy (29)
- Japan (18)
- Kazakhstan (12)
- Kenya
- Kyrgyzstan (8)
- Latvia (11)
- Lithuania (14)
- Luxembourg (3)
- Macau (6)
- Mexico (9)
- Montenegro (1)
- Netherlands (8)
- New Zealand (12)
- Norway (7)
- Philippines (3)
- Poland (37)
- Portugal (13)
- Romania (18)
- Russia (42)
- Samoa (1)
- Senegal (3)
- Seychelles (1)
- Serbia (15)
- Singapore (7)
- Slovakia (16)
- Slovenia (7)
- South Africa (15)
- South Korea (10)
- Spain (40)
- Sweden (16)
- Switzerland (3)
- Tahiti (1)
- Chinese Taipei (2)
- Thailand (5)
- Tunisia (7)
- Turkey (3)
- Ukraine (37)
- United States (17)
- Uzbekistan (12)
- Vietnam (4)

Russia had the most overall attendees with 42.

The media guide listed 75 nations as participating, but four nations listed did not compete (India, Iraq, Malta, Malaysia).

== Results ==
=== Men's ===
Non-Olympic classes

==== Canoe ====
Russia won the most medals with four. The people with the most medals were two with Ivan Shtyl (Russia), Alexandru Dumitrescu (Romania), Victo Mihalachi (Romania), Vadim Menkov (Uzbeskistan), Dzianis Harasha (Belarus), Ronald Verch (Germany), and Paweł Baraszkiewicz (Poland). For the second time in the history of the championships, a tie occurred for a medal in the C-1 200 m bronze between Canada's Richard Dalton and Ukraine's Yuriy Cheban. The first occurred thirty-five years earlier, in the K-1 1000 m gold between Italy's Oreste Perri and Poland's Grzegorz Śledziewski.

Event	Heats	Semifinals	Final	Gold	Time	Silver	Time	Bronze	Time
C-1 200 m	21 August	21 August	22 August	Ivan Shtyl (RUS)	39.161	Thomas Simart (FRA)	39.729	Richard Dalton (CAN); Yuriy Cheban (UKR)	39.953
C-1 500 m	20 August	20 August	22 August	Dzianis Harasha (BLR)	1:47.701	Li Qiang (CHN)	1:48.317	Vadim Menkov (UZB)	1:48.457
C-1 1000 m	19 August	19 August	21 August	Vadim Menkov (UZB)	3:51.721	Attila Vajda (HUN)	3:51.921	Sebastian Brendel (GER)	3:53.837
C-1 5000 m	NA	NA	21 August	Ronald Verch (GER)	23:24.342	José Luis Bouza (ESP)	23:26.398	Marian Ostcril (SVK)	23:38.070
C-1 4 × 200 m relay	22 August	NA	22 August	Russia; Ivan Shtyl; Mikhail Pavlov; Nikolay Lipkin; Evgeny Ignatov	2:48.143	Ukraine; Oleksandr Maksymchuk; Yuriy Cheban; Stanislav Shymansky; Vyacheslav Tsekhosh	2:50.675	Poland; Adam Ginter; Roman Rynkiewicz; Mariusz Kruk; Paweł Baraszkiewicz	2:51.059
C-2 200 m	21 August	21 August	22 August	Lithuania; Raimundas Labuckas; Tomas Gadeikis	36.019	Russia; Evgeny Ignatov; Ivan Shtyl	36.411	Poland; Paweł Skowroński; Paweł Baraszkiewicz	36.551
C-2 500 m	20 August	20 August	22 August	Romania; Alexandru Dumitrescu; Victor Mihalachi	1:40.781	Azerbaijan; Sergiy Bezugliy; Maksym Prokopenko	1:41.277	Russia; Pavel Petrov; Alexander Kostogold	1:41.345
C-2 1000 m	19 August	19 August	21 August	Romania; Alexandru Dumitrescu; Victor Mihalachi	3:37.317	Belarus; Andrei Bahdanovich; Aliaksandr Bahdanovich	3:37.325	Hungary; Márton Tóth; Róbert Mike	3:38.057
C-4 1000 m	19 August	19 August	21 August	Belarus; Dzmitry Rabchanka; Dzmitry Vaitsishkin; Dzianis Harasha; Aliaksandr Vauchetski	3:18.724	Romania; Gabriel Gheoca; Nicolae Bogdan; Mihail Simon; Florin Comănici	3:20.548	Germany; Chris Wend; Tomasz Wylenzek; Ronald Verch; Erik Rebstock	3:20.616

==== Kayak ====
Germany and Great Britain were the big medal winners with four each. Germany won the most golds with two. Ronald Rauhe won his record twenty-first world championship medal, eclipsing the record he tied last year with fellow German Torsten Gutsche. Ten canoeists each won two medals from five different countries.

Event	Heats	Semifinals	Final	Gold	Time	Silver	Time	Bronze	Time
K-1 200 m	21 August	21 August	22 August	Edward McKeever (GBR)	34.807	Ronald Rauhe (GER)	35.155	Piotr Siemionowski (POL)	35.195
K-1 500 m	20 August	20 August	22 August	Anders Gustafsson (SWE)	1:38.457	Peter Gelle (SVK)	1:38.961	Adam van Koeverden (CAN)	1:39.005
K-1 1000 m	19 August	19 August	21 August	Max Hoff (GER)	3:29.544	Tim Brabants (GBR)	3:30.040	Aleh Yurenia (BLR)	3:30.128
K-1 5000 m	NA	NA	21 August	Ken Wallace (AUS)	20:01.338	Max Hoff (GER)	20:03.574	Maximilian Benassi (ITA)	20:06.670
K-1 4 × 200 m relay	22 August	NA	22 August	Spain; Saúl Craviotto; Francisco Llera; Pablo Andrés; Carlos Pérez	2:27.409	Great Britain; Edward McKeever; Jon Schofield; Liam Heath; Edward Cox	2:27.897	Russia; Viktor Zavolskiy; Alexander Dyachenko; Yevgeny Salakhov; Alexander Nikolaev	2:28.753
K-2 200 m	21 August	21 August	22 August	France; Arnaud Hybois; Sébastien Jouve	31.532	Spain; Saúl Craviotto; Carlos Pérez	31.540	Great Britain; Liam Heath; Jon Schofield	31.584
K-2 500 m	20 August	20 August	22 August	Belarus; Raman Piatrushenka; Vadzim Makhneu	1:29.230	Portugal; Fernando Pimenta; João Ribeiro	1:29.970	Serbia; Duško Stanojević; Dejan Pajić	1:30.418
K-2 1000 m	19 August	19 August	21 August	Germany; Martin Hollstein; Andreas Ihle	3:13.024	Hungary; Zoltán Kammerer; Ákos Vereckei	3:13.204	Russia; Ilya Medvedev; Anton Ryakhov	3:15.736
K-4 1000m	19 August	19 August	21 August	France; Arnaud Hybois; Étienne Hubert; Sébastien Jouve; Philippe Colin	2:54.103	Belarus; Raman Piatrushenka; Aliaksei Abalmasau; Artur Litvinchuk; Vadzim Makhneu	2:55.843	Czech Republic; Ondřej Horský; Jan Souček; Daniel Havel; Jan Štěrba	2:56.023

=== Women's ===
Non-Olympic classes

==== Canoe ====
The first women's event was won by Canada's Laurence Vincent-Lapointe.

Event	Heats	Semifinals	Final	Gold	Time	Silver	Time	Bronze	Time
C-1 200 m	21 August	21 August	22 August	Laurence Vincent-Lapointe (CAN)	48.188	Li Tiantian (CHN)	48.992	Maria Kazakova (RUS)	51.724

==== Kayak ====
Hungary was the big medal winner, medaling in all nine events including six golds. The big individual winner was Natasa Janics of Hungary with five (three gold, two silver). Her teammate Katalin Kovács, won three medals to bring her career total to 38, matching that of Germany's Birgit Fischer though Kovacs did break Fischer's career gold medal count to 29, eclipsing Fischer's 28. Japan earned their first medal at the championships with Shinobu Kitamoto's bronze in the K-1 200 m event. Rachel Cawthorn became the first British woman to medal at the championships with her bronze in the K-1 500 m event.

Event	Heats	Semifinals	Final	Gold	Time	Silver	Time	Bronze	Time
K-1 200 m	21 August	21 August	22 August	Nataša Janić (HUN)	40.181	Inna Osypenko (UKR)	40.797	Shinobu Kitamoto (JPN)	40.917
K-1 500 m	20 August	20 August	22 August	Inna Osypenko (UKR)	1:50.461	Nataša Janić (HUN)	1:50.625	Rachel Cawthorn (GBR)	1:50.929
K-1 1000 m	19 August	19 August	21 August	Franziska Weber (GER)	3:57.544	Katalin Kovács (HUN)	4:00.124	Sofia Paldanius (SWE)	4:00.280
K-1 5000 m	NA	NA	21 August	Vivien Folláth (HUN)	22:44.927	Maryna Paltaran (BLR)	22:53.079	Anne Rikala (FIN)	23:07.683
K-1 4 × 200 m relay	22 August	NA	22 August	Germany; Nicole Reinhardt; Conny Waßmuth; Tina Dietze; Katrin Wagner-Augustin	2:50.315	Hungary; Nataša Janić; Zomilla Hegyi; Ninetta Vad; Tímea Paksy	2:52.211	Russia; Natalia Lobova; Anastasia Sergeeva; Natalia Proskurina; Anastasia Panchenko	2:52.959
K-2 200 m	21 August	21 August	22 August	Hungary; Katalin Kovács; Nataša Janić	36.886	Poland; Marta Walczykiewicz; Ewelina Wojnarowska	37.766	Slovakia; Ivana Kmeťová; Martina Kohlová	37.778
K-2 500 m	20 August	20 August	22 August	Hungary; Gabriella Szabó; Danuta Kozák	1:40.064	Russia; Juliana Salakhova; Anastasia Sergeeva	1:41.628	Austria; Yvonne Schuring; Viktoria Schwarz	1:42.684
K-2 1000 m	19 August	19 August	21 August	Hungary; Gabriella Szabó; Tamara Csipes	3:34.306	Germany; Carolin Leonhardt; Silke Hörmann	3:37.426	Russia; Juliana Salakhova; Anastasia Sergeeva	3:37.554
K-4 500 m	20 August	20 August	22 August	Hungary; Nataša Janić; Tamara Csipes; Katalin Kovács; Dalma Benedek	1:31.607	Germany; Fanny Fischer; Nicole Reinhardt; Katrin Wagner-Augustin; Tina Dietze	1:32.795	Poland; Karolina Naja; Aneta Konieczna; Sandra Pawelczak; Magdalena Krukowska	1:33.815

=== Paracanoe ===
Italy won the most medals with four though none of them were gold. Canada and Brazil each won two golds and three overall. All three of Brazil's medals were the first in the history of the world championships. Tahiti's Patrick Viriamu became the first medalist from his country at the world championships as well.

Event	Heats	Semifinals	Finals	Gold	Time	Silver	Time	Bronze	Time
Men's K-1 200 m A	NA	NA	20 August	Fernando Fernandes Padua (BRA)	56.151	Antonio De Diego (ESP)	1:06.215	Jono Broome (GBR)	1:07.179
Men's K-1 200 m LTA	19 August	NA	20 August	Iulian Serban (ROU)	44.176	Martin Farineaux (FRA)	44.448	Andrea Testa (ITA)	45.440
Men's K-1 200 m TA	NA	NA	20 August	Marcus Swoboda (AUT)	44.617	Paolo Bressi (ITA)	53.437	Henry Manni (FIN)	56.281
Men's V-1 200 m LTA, TA, A	19 August	NA	20 August	Patrick Viriamu (TAH)	54.918	Gerhard Bowitzky (GER)	57.046	George Thomas (NZL)	1:00.918
Women's K-1 200 m LTA	NA	NA	20 August	Christine Gauthier (CAN)	53.190	Marta Santos Ferreira (BRA)	1:04.334	Giovanna Chiriu (ITA)	1:04.346
Women's K-1 200 m TA	NA	NA	20 August	Marta Santos Ferreira (BRA)	1:02.942	Christine Selinger (CAN)	1:04.534	Séverine Amiot (FRA)	1:06.090
Women's V-1 200 m LTA, TA, A	NA	NA	20 August	Christine Selinger (CAN)	1:12.096	Tami Hetke (USA)	1:12.520	Lorella Bellato (ITA)	1:20.444

=== Exhibition ===
==== Women's canoe ====
Event	Heats	Semifinals	Final	First	Time	Second	Time	Third	Time
C-2 500 m	NA	NA	22 August	Canada; Laurence Vincent-Lapointe; Mallorie Nicholson	2:03.622	Russia; Maria Kazakova; Ekaterina Petrova	2:18.110	Brazil; Luciana Costa; Camila Conceição Lima	2:19.254

== Medal table ==
Shown for the non-exhibition events only.

Rank	Nation	Gold	Silver	Bronze	Total
1	Hungary	6	5	1	12
2	Germany	5	5	2	12
3	Belarus	3	3	1	7
4	Canada	3	1	2	6
5	Romania	3	1	0	4
6	Russia	2	2	6	10
7	France	2	2	1	5
8	Brazil	2	1	0	3
9	Spain	1	3	0	4
10	Great Britain	1	2	3	6
11	Ukraine	1	2	1	4
12	Austria	1	0	1	2
12	Sweden	1	0	1	2
12	Uzbekistan	1	0	1	2
15	Australia	1	0	0	1
15	French Polynesia	1	0	0	1
15	Lithuania	1	0	0	1
18	China	0	2	0	2
19	Italy	0	1	4	5
19	Poland	0	1	4	5
21	Slovakia	0	1	2	3
22	Azerbaijan	0	1	0	1
22	Portugal	0	1	0	1
22	United States	0	1	0	1
25	Finland	0	0	2	2
26	Czech Republic	0	0	1	1
26	Japan	0	0	1	1
26	New Zealand	0	0	1	1
26	Serbia	0	0	1	1
Totals (29 entries)		35	35	36	106

Source: Medal table – from official website. Retrieved 22 August 2010.
