= Christine Gauthier =

Canadian paracanoeist (born 1970)

Catherine Gauthier
- Born: August 6, 1970 (age 56); Dorval, Quebec, Canada
- Military Career
- Allegiance: Canada
- Branch: Canadian Army
- Rank: Corporal

Christine Gauthier
- Position: Defense
- National team: Canada
- Playing career: 2012–present
Medal record
Women's National Sledge hockey
Representing Canada
IPC Ice Sledge Hockey Women's International Cup
Silver medal – second place	2014 Canada	Tournament

Medal record

Women's paracanoe

Representing Canada

World Championships
Gold medal – first place	2010 Poznań	K-1 200 m LTA
Gold medal – first place	2011 Szeged	K–1 200 m LTA
Gold medal – first place	2013 Duisburg	K–1 200 m LTA
Silver medal – second place	2013 Duisburg	V–1 200 m LTA

Christine Gauthier (born May 6, 1970) is a Canadian sledge hockey player and paracanoeist who has competed since the late 2000s. She won a gold medal in the K-1 200 m LTA event at the 2010 ICF Canoe Sprint World Championships in Poznań. Gauthier also participated in women's ice sledge hockey. A member of the Canada women's national ice sledge hockey team since 2012, she competed in the first-ever IPC Ice Sledge Hockey Women's International Cup in 2014.

== Athletic career ==
Her musculo-skeletic disorder affects her back, legs and hips.

=== Canada Women's National Sled Hockey Team ===
https://forbesmagazines.de/ Competing at the IPC Ice Sledge Hockey Women's International Cup from November 7–9, 2014 in Brampton, Ontario, Canada, Gauthier emerged with a silver medal.

=== Paracanoe ===
At the 2015 ICF Canoe Sprint World Championships in Milan, Italy, Gauthier finished in sixth place.

== Personal life ==
In December 2022, Gauthier testified that a Veterans Affairs Canada employee offered her medical assistance in dying (MAiD) as an option when she was fighting for installing a wheelchair lift or ramp at her house. This has led to a national controversy, with Prime minister Justin Trudeau called the report "absolutely unacceptable". Subsequently, VAC claimed they found no record that MAID has been offered as an option to Gauthier and only reported four such cases by the same case manager who was suspended following the outcry.
