= Pooja Ojha =

Indian para athlete

Personal information
- Born: 1990 (age 35–36) Bhind, India

Sport
- Sport: Paracanoe
Medal record
Representing India
World Championships
Silver medal – second place	2022 Dartmouth	VL1
Silver medal – second place	2023 Duisburg	VL1
Silver medal – second place	2024 Szeged	VL1

Pooja Ojha (born 1990) is an Indian para athlete from Madhya Pradesh who competes in canoeing. She qualified for the 2024 Summer Paralympics in the canoeing women's KL1 event. India earned quota places for the following events through the 2023 ICF Canoe Sprint World Championships in Duisburg, Germany; and 2024 ICF Canoe Sprint World Championships in Szeged, Hungary. Earlier, she represented India at the 2022 Asian Para Games at Hangzhou, China.

== Early life ==
Ojha is from Bhind, Madhya Pradesh. She was born with polio and is 80 per cent paralyzed from waist down. Her father, a daily wage worker, supported and encouraged her. Initially, she had a fear of water but slowly overcame it. Now her father works as an assistant after India Post gave him a job.

== Career ==
Ojha won India's first ever medal at Canoe Sprint World Championships at Halifax, Canada in August 2022. In May 2024, she won a silver medal at the Para Canoe World Championships at Hungary in VL1 200m category.
