= Para canoe =

Canoeing for athletes with physical disabilities

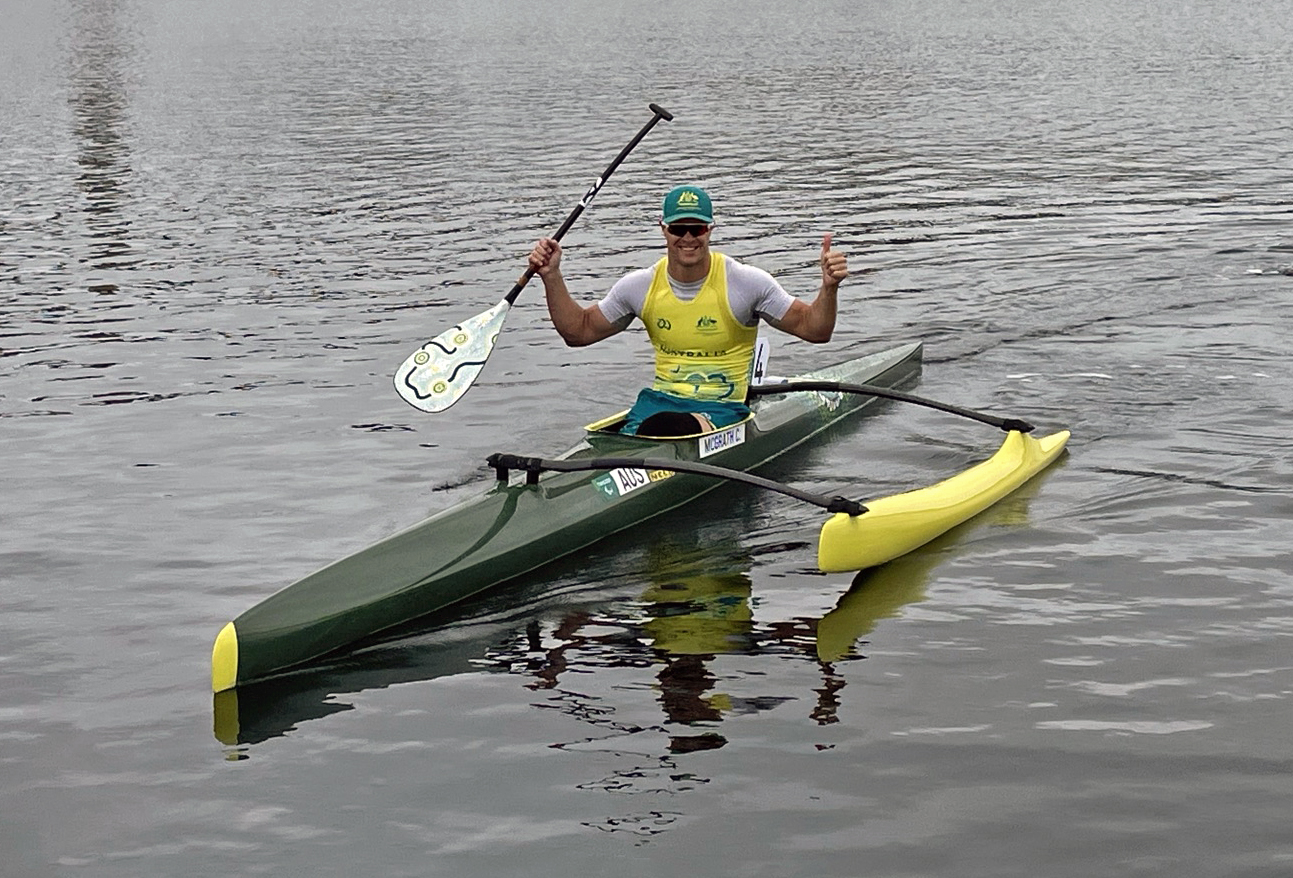
- Australian Curtis McGrath celebrates his win in the men's VL3 va'a event at the Tokyo Paralympics
- Highest governing body: International Canoe Federation; International Va'a Federation
- Other names: Paracanoe
- First event: 2009

Presence
- World Championships: 2010
- Paralympic: 2016

Para canoe is canoeing for athletes with a range of physical disabilities. The Paralympic version of the sport is governed by the International Canoe Federation (ICF), and a va'a-specific variant is governed by the International Va'a Federation (IVF).

The first Para canoe racing event was held in Dartmouth, Canada in 2009 at the Canoe Sprint World Championship. A meeting of the International Paralympic Committee Governing Board in Guangzhou, China in 2010 decided to add Para canoe to the Paralympic programme. As a result, Para canoe debuted at the Rio 2016 Summer Paralympics where single kayak races were contested. Tokyo 2020 Paralympic Games marked the debut of va’a, competing in three medal events, two for men and one for women, hosting 9 races.

== Equipment ==
The two main types of Para canoe boat are kayaks (K), with a double-blade paddle, and outrigger canoes called va'as (V) where the paddler has a second hull as a support float and uses a single blade paddle with a T-top handle.

== ICF Para canoe ==
=== Classification ===
In the single kayak, there are three event classifications (linked to different levels of mobility impairment) for both men and women. Both kayak and va’a have three different classes with KL1, KL2, KL3. For safety purposes, athletes are not allowed to be attached to the boat, and adaptation can be made to seats, sockets and grip to aid athletes get a better grip of the canoe.

- KL1 (formerly A; Arms) This grouping is for paddlers who have no trunk function (i.e. shoulder function only). A KL1 class paddler is able to apply force predominantly using the arms and/or shoulders.
- KL2 (formerly TA; Trunk and Arms): paddlers who have good use of the trunk and arms, but limited use of their legs. They are unable to apply continuous and controlled force to the footboard or seat to propel the boat.
- KL3 (formerly LTA; Legs, Trunk and Arms): this class is for paddlers with a disability who have good use of their legs, trunk and arms for paddling, and who can apply force to the foot board or the seat to propel the boat.

There is also a three-tier ICF classification system in place for single va'a events (VL1, VL2, VL3).

=== Competition format ===
All international Para canoe competitions are held over 200 metres in single kayak or va'a boats.

It is contested at World Championships, World Cups and continental championships. As of November 2021, ten of the twelve events (all six kayak events, both VL2 and VL3 events) are also on the Paralympic programme.

=== ICF World Championships ===
At the 2009 ICF Canoe Sprint World Championships in Dartmouth, four 'paddability' races featured as non-medal exhibition events, including two male-female mixed disciplines in kayak doubles and in doubles canoe ('aka' Canadian or kneeling canoeing).

The sport made its official ICF Canoe Sprint World Championships debut in 2010 and has generally been contested every year since, either within said championships or (in Paralympic years) at the standalone ICF Paracanoe World Championships. The sport will make its marathon distance debut at the 2025 ICF Canoe Marathon World Championships.

== IVF Para canoe ==
In IVF competition, a points system is used with a higher number assigned to less impaired paddlers and lower points for more severe impairment.

In team events the total number of points of a boat crew are limited; 26 points in 6-person boats and 52 for 12-person boats. In single-seat boats competition take place in three divisions; division 1 for 5 or 6-point paddlers, division 2 for 4-point paddlers and division 3 is for 2 or 3-point paddlers. 1-point paddlers do not participate in singles races. The three divisions approximately correspond to the three ICF va'a classes.

== See also ==
- Canoe at the Summer Paralympics
