= 2017 ICF Canoe Sprint World Championships – Men's KL3 =

Men's KL3 at the 2017 ICF Canoe Sprint World Championships
- Venue: Sportcentrum Račice
- Location: Račice, Czech Republic
- Dates: 23–26 August
- Competitors: 30 from 24 nations
- Winning time: 39.632

Medalists
gold medal	Serhii Yemelianov	Ukraine
silver medal	Caio Ribeiro de Carvalho	Brazil
bronze medal	Jonathan Young	Great Britain

The men's KL3 competition at the 2017 ICF Canoe Sprint World Championships in Račice took place at the Sportcentrum Račice.

== Schedule ==
The schedule was as follows:

Date	Time	Round
Wednesday 23 August 2017	09:55	Heats
Wednesday 23 August 2017	11:10	Semifinals
Saturday 26 August 2017	14:25	Final B
Saturday 26 August 2017	14:30	Final A

All times are Central European Summer Time (UTC+2)

== Results ==
=== Heats ===
The six fastest boats in each heat, plus the three fastest remaining boats advanced to the semifinals.

==== Heat 1 ====
Rank	Name	Country	Time	Notes
1	Jonathan Young	Great Britain	40.762	QS
2	Tom Kierey	Germany	41.456	QS
3	Scott Martlew	New Zealand	42.212	QS
4	Martin Farineaux	France	42.256	QS
5	Mateusz Surwiło	Poland	43.001	QS
6	Adrián Mosquera	Spain	45.340	QS
7	Erik Kiss	Hungary	46.868	qS
8	Simone Giannini	Italy	46.890	

==== Heat 2 ====
Rank	Name	Country	Time	Notes
1	Serhii Yemelianov	Ukraine	40.594	QS
2	Artem Voronkov	Russia	41.228	QS
3	Patrick O'Leary	Ireland	42.872	QS
4	Suradech Namtaothong	Thailand	45.022	QS
5	Kwadzo Klokpah	Italy	45.228	QS
6	Marcos Alejandro Dominguez	Argentina	46.300	QS
7	Manish Kaurav	India	46.478	qS

==== Heat 3 ====
Rank	Name	Country	Time	Notes
1	Leonid Krylov	Russia	40.193	QS
2	Robert Oliver	Great Britain	41.676	QS
3	Juan Antonio Valle	Spain	42.826	QS
4	Zhalgas Taikenov	Kazakhstan	43.115	QS
5	Eteoklis Pavlou	Greece	43.388	QS
6	István Fábián	Hungary	48.399	QS
7	Lau Wai Man	Macau	1:03.321	

==== Heat 4 ====
Rank	Name	Country	Time	Notes
1	Caio Ribeiro de Carvalho	Brazil	40.213	QS
2	Dylan Littlehales	Australia	41.235	QS
3	Iulian Șerban	Romania	41.607	QS
4	Nader Eivazi	Iran	43.790	QS
5	Pavel Suleymanov	Uzbekistan	43.813	QS
6	Ron Halevi	Israel	45.985	QS
7	Nikiha Miller	United States	46.174	qS
8	Priyokumar Singh Waikhom	India	50.385	

=== Semifinals ===
Qualification in each semi was as follows:

The fastest three boats advanced to the A final.
The next three fastest boats advanced to the B final.

==== Semifinal 1 ====
Rank	Name	Country	Time	Notes
1	Serhii Yemelianov	Ukraine	39.597	QA
2	Caio Ribeiro de Carvalho	Brazil	39.797	QA
3	Tom Kierey	Germany	40.874	QA
4	Juan Antonio Valle	Spain	41.274	QB
5	Zhalgas Taikenov	Kazakhstan	42.413	QB
6	Adrián Mosquera	Spain	44.869	QB
7	Marcos Alejandro Dominguez	Argentina	45.913	
8	Nikiha Miller	United States	46.397	
–	Pavel Suleymanov	Uzbekistan	DNS	

==== Semifinal 2 ====
Rank	Name	Country	Time	Notes
1	Leonid Krylov	Russia	40.025	QA
2	Dylan Littlehales	Australia	40.808	QA
3	Patrick O'Leary	Ireland	41.675	QA
4	Mateusz Surwiło	Poland	42.080	QB
5	Scott Martlew	New Zealand	42.186	QB
6	Nader Eivazi	Iran	44.575	QB
7	Suradech Namtaothong	Thailand	45.308	
8	István Fábián	Hungary	46.897	
–	Manish Kaurav	India	DNS	

==== Semifinal 3 ====
Rank	Name	Country	Time	Notes
1	Jonathan Young	Great Britain	40.328	QA
2	Robert Oliver	Great Britain	40.472	QA
3	Artem Voronkov	Russia	40.745	QA
4	Martin Farineaux	France	42.189	QB
5	Iulian Șerban	Romania	42.322	QB
6	Eteoklis Pavlou	Greece	43.928	QB
7	Ron Halevi	Israel	45.728	
8	Kwadzo Klokpah	Italy	45.878	
9	Erik Kiss	Hungary	46.584	

=== Finals ===
==== Final B ====
Competitors in this final raced for positions 10 to 18.

Rank	Name	Country	Time
1	Juan Antonio Valle	Spain	41.864
2	Martin Farineaux	France	42.042
3	Iulian Șerban	Romania	42.326
4	Scott Martlew	New Zealand	42.776
5	Mateusz Surwiło	Poland	43.342
6	Eteoklis Pavlou	Greece	43.776
7	Zhalgas Taikenov	Kazakhstan	44.109
8	Nader Eivazi	Iran	45.009
9	Adrián Mosquera	Spain	45.720

==== Final A ====
Competitors in this final raced for positions 1 to 9, with medals going to the top three.

Rank	Name	Country	Time
1st place, gold medalist(s)	Serhii Yemelianov	Ukraine	39.632
2nd place, silver medalist(s)	Caio Ribeiro de Carvalho	Brazil	39.821
3rd place, bronze medalist(s)	Jonathan Young	Great Britain	40.104
4	Leonid Krylov	Russia	40.254
5	Dylan Littlehales	Australia	40.782
6	Robert Oliver	Great Britain	40.793
7	Artem Voronkov	Russia	41.037
8	Tom Kierey	Germany	41.326
9	Patrick O'Leary	Ireland	42.332
