= 2019 ICF Canoe Sprint World Championships – Men's KL3 =

Men's KL3 at the 2019 ICF Canoe Sprint World Championships
- Venue: Olympic Centre of Szeged
- Location: Szeged, Hungary
- Dates: 21–24 August
- Competitors: 30 from 21 nations
- Winning time: 40.03

Medalists
gold medal	Serhii Yemelianov	Ukraine
silver medal	Leonid Krylov	Russia
bronze medal	Caio Ribeiro de Carvalho	Brazil

The men's KL3 competition at the 2019 ICF Canoe Sprint World Championships in Szeged took place at the Olympic Centre of Szeged.

== Schedule ==
The schedule was as follows:

Date	Time	Round
Wednesday 21 August 2019	09:30	Heats
Wednesday 21 August 2019	12:35	Semifinals
Saturday 24 August 2019	10:10	Final B
Saturday 24 August 2019	10:25	Final A

All times are Central European Summer Time (UTC+2)

== Results ==
=== Heats ===
The six fastest boats in each heat, plus the three fastest seventh-place boats advanced to the semifinals.

==== Heat 1 ====
Rank	Name	Country	Time	Notes
1	Serhii Yemelianov	Ukraine	40.48	QS
2	Tom Kierey	Germany	41.47	QS
3	Juan Antonio Valle	Spain	41.55	QS
4	Mateusz Surwiło	Poland	41.84	QS
5	Pavel Suleymanov	Uzbekistan	44.49	QS
6	Zhalgas Taikenov	Kazakhstan	44.72	QS
7	Zaid Mata	Venezuela	46.22	qS
8	Miroslav Djordjevic	Serbia	48.28	

==== Heat 2 ====
Rank	Name	Country	Time	Notes
1	Caio Ribeiro de Carvalho	Brazil	39.85	QS
2	Dylan Littlehales	Australia	41.54	QS
3	Kwadzo Klokpah	Italy	42.90	QS
4	Erik Kiss	Hungary	43.34	QS
5	Ron Halevi	Israel	44.23	QS
6	Hwang Seung-oh	South Korea	45.88	QS
7	Lu Xiaocong	China	47.81	qS

==== Heat 3 ====
Rank	Name	Country	Time	Notes
1	Leonid Krylov	Russia	40.44	QS
2	Jonathan Young	Great Britain	42.99	QS
3	Adrián Mosquera	Spain	44.91	QS
4	Dávid Török	Hungary	45.36	QS
5	Nader Eivazi	Iran	45.72	QS
6	John Wallace	United States	47.72	QS
7	Hua Zhixin	China	48.86	qS
8	Kim Bum-shik	South Korea	50.28	

==== Heat 4 ====
Rank	Name	Country	Time	Notes
1	Robert Oliver	Great Britain	41.59	QS
2	Artem Voronkov	Russia	42.02	QS
3	Patrick O'Leary	Ireland	42.36	QS
4	Giovane Vieira de Paula	Brazil	43.02	QS
5	Khasan Kuldashev	Uzbekistan	45.25	QS
6	Brahim Guendouz	Algeria	45.51	QS
7	Strahinja Bukvić	Serbia	50.37	

=== Semifinals ===
Qualification in each semi was as follows:

The fastest three boats advanced to the A final.
The next three fastest boats advanced to the B final.

==== Semifinal 1 ====
Rank	Name	Country	Time	Notes
1	Caio Ribeiro de Carvalho	Brazil	39.55	QA
2	Robert Oliver	Great Britain	40.91	QA
3	Tom Kierey	Germany	42.93	QA
4	Khasan Kuldashev	Uzbekistan	43.99	QB
5	Adrián Mosquera	Spain	44.16	QB
6	Zaid Mata	Venezuela	45.13	QB
7	Zhalgas Taikenov	Kazakhstan	45.26	
8	Dávid Török	Hungary	45.77	
9	Hwang Seung-oh	South Korea	46.39	

==== Semifinal 2 ====
Rank	Name	Country	Time	Notes
1	Leonid Krylov	Russia	39.64	QA
2	Juan Antonio Valle	Spain	40.68	QA
3	Artem Voronkov	Russia	41.07	QA
4	Giovane Vieira de Paula	Brazil	42.10	QB
5	Kwadzo Klokpah	Italy	42.49	QB
6	Erik Kiss	Hungary	43.35	QB
7	Pavel Suleymanov	Uzbekistan	44.56	
8	Lu Xiaocong	China	48.43	
9	John Wallace	United States	49.13	

==== Semifinal 3 ====
Rank	Name	Country	Time	Notes
1	Serhii Yemelianov	Ukraine	39.77	QA
2	Dylan Littlehales	Australia	40.16	QA
3	Jonathan Young	Great Britain	41.48	QA
4	Patrick O'Leary	Ireland	41.69	QB
5	Mateusz Surwiło	Poland	42.01	QB
6	Ron Halevi	Israel	44.48	QB
7	Nader Eivazi	Iran	45.67	
8	Brahim Guendouz	Algeria	45.79	
9	Hua Zhixin	China	48.99	

=== Finals ===
==== Final B ====
Competitors in this final raced for positions 10 to 18.

Rank	Name	Country	Time
1	Patrick O'Leary	Ireland	42.22
2	Mateusz Surwiło	Poland	42.77
3	Giovane Vieira de Paula	Brazil	43.44
4	Kwadzo Klokpah	Italy	44.13
5	Khasan Kuldashev	Uzbekistan	44.74
6	Ron Halevi	Israel	44.88
7	Erik Kiss	Hungary	44.94
8	Adrián Mosquera	Spain	45.11
9	Zaid Mata	Venezuela	45.93

==== Final A ====
Competitors raced for positions 1 to 9, with medals going to the top three.

Rank	Name	Country	Time
1st place, gold medalist(s)	Serhii Yemelianov	Ukraine	40.03
2nd place, silver medalist(s)	Leonid Krylov	Russia	40.56
3rd place, bronze medalist(s)	Caio Ribeiro de Carvalho	Brazil	40.70
4	Dylan Littlehales	Australia	40.79
5	Robert Oliver	Great Britain	42.26
6	Artem Voronkov	Russia	42.39
7	Juan Antonio Valle	Spain	42.46
8	Tom Kierey	Germany	42.63
9	Jonathan Young	Great Britain	43.66
