= Canoe at the 2016 Summer Paralympics – Men's KL3 =

Men's KL3 at the XV Paralympic Games
- Venue: Lagoa Rodrigo de Freitas
- Dates: 14–15 September 2016
- Competitors: 10 from 10 nations

Medalists
1st place, gold medalist(s)		Serhii Yemelianov	Ukraine
2nd place, silver medalist(s)		Tom Kierey	Germany
3rd place, bronze medalist(s)		Caio Ribeiro de Carvalho	Brazil

The Canoe Sprint men's KL3 event at the 2016 Paralympic Games took place on 14 and 15 September 2016, at the Lagoa Rodrigo de Freitas. Two heats were held. Winners and runners up advanced directly to the final. The rest went into the semifinal, where the top four advanced to the final.

== Heats ==
=== Heat 1 ===
9:50 14 September 2016:

Rank	Lane	Name	Nationality	Time	Notes
1	6	Tom Kierey	Germany	42.345	F
2	5	Iulian Șerban	Romania	43.223	F
3	7	Robert Oliver	Great Britain	44.368	SF
4	8	Dylan Littlehales	Australia	46.305	SF
5	4	Mateusz Surwilo	Poland	50.339	SF

=== Heat 2 ===
9:55 14 September 2016:

Rank	Lane	Name	Nationality	Time	Notes
1	5	Caio Ribeiro de Carvalho	Brazil	43.033	F
2	6	Serhii Yemelianov	Ukraine	45.239	F
3	8	Patrick O'Leary	Ireland	45.977	SF
4	4	Scott Martlew	New Zealand	46.024	SF
5	7	Martin Farineaux	France	46.577	SF

== Semifinal ==
10:50 14 September 2016:

Rank	Lane	Name	Nationality	Time	Notes
1	5	Robert Oliver	Great Britain	42.852	F
2	3	Martin Farineaux	France	43.572	F
3	6	Patrick O'Leary	Ireland	44.135	F
4	4	Scott Martlew	New Zealand	44.284	F
5	8	Mateusz Surwilo	Poland	45.189	
6	7	Dylan Littlehales	Australia	45.258	

== Final ==
10:10 15 September 2016:

Rank	Lane	Name	Nationality	Time	Notes
1st place, gold medalist(s)	3	Serhii Yemelianov	Ukraine	39.810	
2nd place, silver medalist(s)	4	Tom Kierey	Germany	39.909	
3rd place, bronze medalist(s)	5	Caio Ribeiro de Carvalho	Brazil	40.199	
4	6	Iulian Șerban	Romania	41.200	
5	7	Robert Oliver	Great Britain	42.410	
6	8	Patrick O'Leary	Ireland	42.783	
7	2	Martin Farineaux	France	43.750	
8	1	Scott Martlew	New Zealand	43.921	
