= 2016 ICF Paracanoe World Championships – Men's KL3 =

Men's KL3 at the 2016 ICF Paracanoe World Championships
- Location: Duisburg, Germany
- Dates: 17–19 May
- Competitors: 42 from 29 nations
- Winning time: 40.430

Medalists
gold medal	Tom Kierey	Germany
silver medal	Serhii Yemelianov	Ukraine
bronze medal	Leonid Krylov	Russia

The men's KL3 competition at the 2016 ICF Paracanoe World Championships took place in Duisburg.

== Schedule ==
The schedule was as follows:

Date	Time	Round
Tuesday 17 May 2016	15:00	Heats
Wednesday 18 May 2016	11:20	Semifinals
Thursday 19 May 2016	11:15	Final C
Thursday 19 May 2016	11:20	Final B
Thursday 19 May 2016	11:25	Final A

All times are Central European Summer Time (UTC+2)

== Results ==
=== Heats ===
The seven fastest boats in each heat, plus the fastest remaining boat advanced to the semifinals.

==== Heat 1 ====
Rank	Name	Country	Time	Notes
1	Tom Kierey	Germany	41.119	QS
2	Artem Voronkov	Russia	43.012	QS
3	Dylan Littlehales	Australia	43.752	QS
4	Eteoklis Pavlou	Greece	43.981	QS
5	Jonás García	Spain	44.944	QS
6	Nikiha Miller	United States	47.607	QS
7	Simone Giannini	Italy	49.581	QS
8	Athanasios Kotsis	Greece	56.795	
9	Yevgeniy Slepov	Belgium	59.939	

==== Heat 2 ====
Rank	Name	Country	Time	Notes
1	Caio Ribeiro de Carvalho	Brazil	41.677	QS
2	Robert Oliver	Great Britain	41.916	QS
3	Martin Farineaux	France	42.839	QS
4	Mateusz Surwiło	Poland	44.083	QS
5	Jonas Mikael El Awsy	Denmark	45.484	QS
6	Suradech Namtaothong	Thailand	46.146	QS
7	Zhalgas Taikenov	Kazakhstan	47.432	QS
8	Zaid Mata	Venezuela	48.055	qS
9	Jiang Jijian	China	57.305	

==== Heat 3 ====
Rank	Name	Country	Time	Notes
1	Leonid Krylov	Russia	40.566	QS
2	Jonathan Young	Great Britain	43.447	QS
3	Arsen Arsenović	Serbia	44.181	QS
4	Ron Halevi	Israel	46.669	QS
5	Tomasz Moździerski	Poland	46.900	QS
6	Talgaton Valiev	Uzbekistan	47.046	QS
7	Akbar Tahmasbi	Iran	48.219	QS
8	István Fábián	Hungary	48.344	

==== Heat 4 ====
Rank	Name	Country	Time	Notes
1	Iulian Șerban	Romania	41.023	QS
2	Patrick O'Leary	Ireland	42.061	QS
3	Edmond Sanka	Senegal	43.109	QS
4	Vander Rogério Pereira de Lima	Brazil	44.601	QS
5	Pier Alberto Buccoliero	Italy	45.114	QS
6	Hua Zhixin	China	48.683	QS
7	Kamil Qayyum Khan	India	49.240	QS
–	Sergei Merzliakov	Russia	DSQ	

==== Heat 5 ====
Rank	Name	Country	Time	Notes
1	Serhii Yemelianov	Ukraine	41.518	QS
2	Scott Martlew	New Zealand	43.289	QS
3	Kasper Sønderby Thomsen	Denmark	45.894	QS
4	János Bencze	Hungary	46.652	QS
5	Manish Kaurav	India	47.407	QS
5	Jonathan Wing	South Africa	47.407	QS
7	Sun Xudong	China	53.155	QS
8	Brandon Holiday	United States	1:18.472	

=== Semifinals ===
Qualification was as follows:

All first and second-place boats, plus the fastest third-place boat advanced to the A final.
All other third-place boats, all fourth-place boats and the two fastest fifth-place boats advanced to the B final.
All other fifth-place boats, all sixth-place boats and the three fastest remaining boats advanced to the C final.

==== Semifinal 1 ====
Rank	Name	Country	Time	Notes
1	Serhii Yemelianov	Ukraine	39.540	QA
2	Tom Kierey	Germany	40.083	QA
3	Patrick O'Leary	Ireland	41.722	QB
4	Mateusz Surwiło	Poland	42.242	QB
5	Jonás García	Spain	42.986	qB
6	Vander Rogério Pereira de Lima	Brazil	43.009	QC
7	Talgaton Valiev	Uzbekistan	44.766	qC
8	Zhalgas Taikenov	Kazakhstan	45.087	qC
9	Sun Xudong	China	51.291	

==== Semifinal 2 ====
Rank	Name	Country	Time	Notes
1	Caio Ribeiro de Carvalho	Brazil	40.571	QA
2	Artem Voronkov	Russia	41.423	QA
3	Edmond Sanka	Senegal	42.237	QB
4	Scott Martlew	New Zealand	42.348	QB
5	Jonas Mikael El Awsy	Denmark	44.845	QC
6	Ron Halevi	Israel	45.229	QC
7	Jonathan Wing	South Africa	46.291	
8	Akbar Tahmasbi	Iran	46.374	
9	Kamil Qayyum Khan	India	49.819	

==== Semifinal 3 ====
Rank	Name	Country	Time	Notes
1	Leonid Krylov	Russia	39.321	QA
2	Robert Oliver	Great Britain	40.659	QA
3	Dylan Littlehales	Australia	41.899	QB
4	Arsen Arsenović	Serbia	42.893	QB
5	Suradech Namtaothong	Thailand	45.101	QC
6	János Bencze	Hungary	45.344	QC
7	Manish Kaurav	India	45.948	
8	Simone Giannini	Italy	47.029	
9	Hua Zhixin	China	47.561	

==== Semifinal 4 ====
Rank	Name	Country	Time	Notes
1	Iulian Șerban	Romania	40.358	QA
2	Jonathan Young	Great Britain	40.926	QA
3	Martin Farineaux	France	41.028	qA
4	Eteoklis Pavlou	Greece	42.064	QB
5	Pier Alberto Buccoliero	Italy	43.725	qB
6	Kasper Sønderby Thomsen	Denmark	43.761	QC
7	Tomasz Moździerski	Poland	44.210	qC
8	Zaid Mata	Venezuela	45.179	
9	Nikiha Miller	United States	45.300	

=== Finals ===
==== Final C ====
Competitors in this final raced for positions 19 to 27.

Rank	Name	Country	Time
1	Vander Rogério Pereira de Lima	Brazil	44.518
2	Tomasz Moździerski	Poland	45.103
3	Jonas Mikael El Awsy	Denmark	45.157
4	Kasper Sønderby Thomsen	Denmark	45.602
5	Suradech Namtaothong	Thailand	46.075
6	Ron Halevi	Israel	46.175
7	Talgaton Valiev	Uzbekistan	46.812
8	János Bencze	Hungary	47.095
9	Zhalgas Taikenov	Kazakhstan	47.177

==== Final B ====
Competitors in this final raced for positions 10 to 18.

Rank	Name	Country	Time
1	Patrick O'Leary	Ireland	42.882
2	Dylan Littlehales	Australia	43.110
2	Arsen Arsenović	Serbia	43.110
4	Mateusz Surwiło	Poland	43.154
5	Scott Martlew	New Zealand	43.288
6	Edmond Sanka	Senegal	43.295
6	Eteoklis Pavlou	Greece	43.295
8	Jonás García	Spain	44.402
9	Pier Alberto Buccoliero	Italy	45.367

==== Final A ====
Competitors in this final raced for positions 1 to 9, with medals going to the top three.

Rank	Name	Country	Time
1st place, gold medalist(s)	Tom Kierey	Germany	40.430
2nd place, silver medalist(s)	Serhii Yemelianov	Ukraine	40.474
3rd place, bronze medalist(s)	Leonid Krylov	Russia	40.636
4	Caio Ribeiro de Carvalho	Brazil	41.117
5	Iulian Șerban	Romania	41.170
6	Robert Oliver	Great Britain	41.413
7	Artem Voronkov	Russia	42.236
8	Jonathan Young	Great Britain	42.276
9	Martin Farineaux	France	42.581
