= 2018 ICF Canoe Sprint World Championships – Men's KL3 =

Men's KL3 at the 2018 ICF Canoe Sprint World Championships
- Venue: Centro de Alto Rendimento de Montemor-o-Velho
- Location: Montemor-o-Velho, Portugal
- Dates: 22–24 August
- Competitors: 29 from 20 nations
- Winning time: 39.031

Medalists
gold medal	Serhii Yemelianov	Ukraine
silver medal	Caio Ribeiro de Carvalho	Brazil
bronze medal	Leonid Krylov	Russia

The men's KL3 competition at the 2018 ICF Canoe Sprint World Championships in Montemor-o-Velho took place at the Centro de Alto Rendimento de Montemor-o-Velho.

== Schedule ==
The schedule was as follows:

Date	Time	Round
Wednesday 22 August 2018	11:25	Heats
Wednesday 22 August 2018	12:45	Semifinals
Friday 24 August 2018	10:33	Final B
Friday 24 August 2018	10:39	Final A

All times are Western European Summer Time (UTC+1)

== Results ==
=== Heats ===
The six fastest boats in each heat, plus the three fastest remaining boats advanced to the semifinals.

==== Heat 1 ====
Rank	Name	Country	Time	Notes
1	Serhii Yemelianov	Ukraine	42.268	QS
2	Juan Antonio Valle	Spain	43.394	QS
3	Patrick O'Leary	Ireland	44.134	QS
4	Ron Halevi	Israel	46.549	QS
5	Dávid Török	Hungary	49.919	QS
6	Vigen Sahakyan	Armenia	56.114	QS
7	Abraão Vieira	Portugal	57.544	

==== Heat 2 ====
Rank	Name	Country	Time	Notes
1	Artem Voronkov	Russia	42.701	QS
2	Iulian Șerban	Romania	43.166	QS
3	Giovane Vieira de Paula	Brazil	44.347	QS
4	Erik Kiss	Hungary	45.262	QS
5	Kwadzo Klokpah	Italy	45.872	QS
6	Nikiha Miller	United States	46.297	QS
7	Lu Xiaocong	China	50.987	qS
8	Swaleh Yunus	Kenya	1:15.013	

==== Heat 3 ====
Rank	Name	Country	Time	Notes
1	Caio Ribeiro de Carvalho	Brazil	40.767	QS
2	Robert Oliver	Great Britain	42.062	QS
3	Mateusz Surwiło	Poland	43.917	QS
4	Jonathan Young	Great Britain	44.467	QS
5	Adrián Mosquera	Spain	45.397	QS
6	Simone Giannini	Italy	48.182	QS
7	Hua Zhixin	China	50.107	qS

==== Heat 4 ====
Rank	Name	Country	Time	Notes
1	Leonid Krylov	Russia	42.118	QS
2	Dylan Littlehales	Australia	42.338	QS
3	Nader Eivazi	Iran	45.148	QS
4	Zhalgas Taikenov	Kazakhstan	48.003	QS
5	Nissim Mayo	Israel	51.639	QS
6	Hiromi Tatsumi	Japan	51.724	QS
7	Francisco Cruz	Portugal	53.534	qS

=== Semifinals ===
Qualification in each semi was as follows:

The fastest three boats advanced to the A final.
The next three fastest boats advanced to the B final.

==== Semifinal 1 ====
Rank	Name	Country	Time	Notes
1	Serhii Yemelianov	Ukraine	40.544	QA
2	Robert Oliver	Great Britain	42.299	QA
3	Iulian Șerban	Romania	43.254	QA
4	Zhalgas Taikenov	Kazakhstan	44.689	QB
5	Adrián Mosquera	Spain	45.434	QB
6	Nader Eivazi	Iran	46.519	QB
7	Nikiha Miller	United States	46.794	
8	Hua Zhixin	China	48.464	
9	Dávid Török	Hungary	48.934	

==== Semifinal 2 ====
Rank	Name	Country	Time	Notes
1	Dylan Littlehales	Australia	42.051	QA
2	Artem Voronkov	Russia	42.231	QA
3	Mateusz Surwiło	Poland	43.341	QA
4	Patrick O'Leary	Ireland	43.431	QB
5	Jonathan Young	Great Britain	43.966	QB
6	Kwadzo Klokpah	Italy	45.981	QB
7	Ron Halevi	Israel	46.376	
8	Hiromi Tatsumi	Japan	52.306	
–	Lu Xiaocong	China	DNF	

==== Semifinal 3 ====
Rank	Name	Country	Time	Notes
1	Caio Ribeiro de Carvalho	Brazil	41.295	QA
2	Leonid Krylov	Russia	42.130	QA
3	Juan Antonio Valle	Spain	42.920	QA
4	Giovane Vieira de Paula	Brazil	44.851	QB
5	Erik Kiss	Hungary	46.411	QB
6	Simone Giannini	Italy	48.241	QB
7	Francisco Cruz	Portugal	52.721	
8	Nissim Mayo	Israel	52.816	
–	Vigen Sahakyan	Armenia	DNS	

=== Finals ===
==== Final B ====
Competitors in this final raced for positions 10 to 18.

Rank	Name	Country	Time
1	Patrick O'Leary	Ireland	42.622
2	Jonathan Young	Great Britain	43.378
3	Zhalgas Taikenov	Kazakhstan	43.393
4	Giovane Vieira de Paula	Brazil	43.963
5	Adrián Mosquera	Spain	44.593
6	Kwadzo Klokpah	Italy	44.663
7	Erik Kiss	Hungary	45.318
8	Nader Eivazi	Iran	46.153
9	Simone Giannini	Italy	47.358

==== Final A ====
Competitors in this final raced for positions 1 to 9, with medals going to the top three.

Rank	Name	Country	Time
1st place, gold medalist(s)	Serhii Yemelianov	Ukraine	39.031
2nd place, silver medalist(s)	Caio Ribeiro de Carvalho	Brazil	39.761
3rd place, bronze medalist(s)	Leonid Krylov	Russia	40.896
4	Robert Oliver	Great Britain	40.987
5	Dylan Littlehales	Australia	41.257
6	Artem Voronkov	Russia	41.582
7	Juan Antonio Valle	Spain	41.602
8	Mateusz Surwiło	Poland	42.522
9	Iulian Șerban	Romania	42.652
