= 2021 ICF Canoe Sprint World Championships – Men's KL3 =

Men's KL3 at the 2021 ICF Canoe Sprint World Championships
- Venue: Lake Bagsværd
- Location: Copenhagen, Denmark
- Dates: 16–18 September
- Competitors: 23 from 15 nations
- Winning time: 39.54

Medalists
gold medal	Serhii Yemelianov	Ukraine
silver medal	Robert Oliver	Great Britain
bronze medal	Juan Valle	Spain

The men's KL3 competition at the 2021 ICF Canoe Sprint World Championships in Copenhagen took place on Lake Bagsværd.

== Schedule ==
The schedule was as follows:

Date	Time	Round
Thursday 16 September 2021	09:20	Heats
Thursday 16 September 2021	11:40	Semifinals
Saturday 18 September 2021	10:15	Final B
Saturday 18 September 2021	10:50	Final A

All times are Central European Summer Time (UTC+2)

== Results ==
=== Heats ===
Heat winners advanced directly to the A final.
The next six fastest boats in each heat advanced to the semifinals.

==== Heat 1 ====
Rank	Name	Country	Time	Notes
1	Serhii Yemelianov	Ukraine	43.85	QA
2	Erik Kiss	Hungary	45.19	QS
3	Pablo Díaz	Spain	45.87	QS
4	Caio Ribeiro de Carvalho	Brazil	48.33	QS
5	Raphaël Louvigny	France	48.41	QS
6	Koichi Imai	Japan	49.54	QS
–	Artem Voronkov	RCF	DNS	

==== Heat 2 ====
Rank	Name	Country	Time	Notes
1	Juan Valle	Spain	41.84	QA
2	Tom Kierey	Germany	42.80	QS
3	Giovane Vieira de Paula	Brazil	43.04	QS
4	Jonathan Young	Great Britain	43.23	QS
5	Zhalgas Taikenov	Kazakhstan	45.08	QS
6	Andrii Syvykh	Ukraine	48.33	QS
–	Manish Kaurav	India	DNS	
–	Leonid Krylov	RCF	DNS	

==== Heat 3 ====
Rank	Name	Country	Time	Notes
1	Robert Oliver	Great Britain	41.26	QA
2	Mateusz Surwiło	Poland	42.39	QS
3	Kwadzo Klokpah	Italy	43.38	QS
4	Martin Farineaux	France	43.64	QS
5	José Segura	Spain	46.03	QS
6	Dávid Török	Hungary	46.49	QS
7	Gabriel Ferron-Bouius	Canada	46.96	QS
–	Edmond Sanka	Senegal	DNS	

=== Semifinals ===
Qualification was as follows:

The fastest three boats in each semi advanced to the A final.
The next four fastest boats in each semi, plus the fastest remaining boat advanced to the B final.

==== Semifinal 1 ====
Rank	Name	Country	Time	Notes
1	Caio Ribeiro de Carvalho	Brazil	42.74	QA
2	Kwadzo Klokpah	Italy	43.50	QA
3	Erik Kiss	Hungary	43.73	QA
4	Giovane Vieira de Paula	Brazil	44.30	QB
5	Martin Farineaux	France	44.36	QB
6	Zhalgas Taikenov	Kazakhstan	46.91	QB
7	Dávid Török	Hungary	47.08	QB
8	Koichi Imai	Japan	49.32	

==== Semifinal 2 ====
Rank	Name	Country	Time	Notes
1	Mateusz Surwiło	Poland	42.29	QA
2	Tom Kierey	Germany	42.54	QA
3	Jonathan Young	Great Britain	43.94	QA
4	Pablo Díaz	Spain	45.84	QB
5	Raphaël Louvigny	France	46.54	QB
6	José Segura	Spain	47.33	QB
7	Gabriel Ferron-Bouius	Canada	47.67	QB
8	Andrii Syvykh	Ukraine	48.17	qB

=== Finals ===
==== Final B ====
Competitors in this final raced for positions 10 to 18.

Rank	Name	Country	Time
1	Giovane Vieira de Paula	Brazil	42.06
2	Martin Farineaux	France	42.21
3	Pablo Díaz	Spain	43.92
4	Zhalgas Taikenov	Kazakhstan	44.26
5	José Segura	Spain	44.57
6	Andrii Syvykh	Ukraine	45.44
7	Raphaël Louvigny	France	45.46
8	Gabriel Ferron-Bouius	Canada	45.65
9	Dávid Török	Hungary	45.87

==== Final A ====
Competitors raced for positions 1 to 9, with medals going to the top three.

Rank	Name	Country	Time
1st place, gold medalist(s)	Serhii Yemelianov	Ukraine	39.54
2nd place, silver medalist(s)	Robert Oliver	Great Britain	40.68
3rd place, bronze medalist(s)	Juan Valle	Spain	41.04
4	Tom Kierey	Germany	41.40
5	Mateusz Surwiło	Poland	41.45
6	Caio Ribeiro de Carvalho	Brazil	41.78
7	Kwadzo Klokpah	Italy	42.69
8	Erik Kiss	Hungary	42.72
9	Jonathan Young	Great Britain	43.40
