= 2025 ICF Canoe Sprint World Championships – Men's KL3 =

Men's KL3 200 metres at the 2025 ICF Canoe Sprint World Championships
- Venue: Idroscalo Regatta Course
- Location: Milan, Italy
- Dates: 22–24 August
- Competitors: 34 from 25 nations
- Winning time: 40.31

Medalists
gold medal	Serhii Yemelianov	Georgia
silver medal	Miquéias Elias Rodrigues	Brazil
bronze medal	Dylan Littlehales	Australia

The men's KL3 competition at the 2025 ICF Canoe Sprint World Championships in Milan took place at Idroscalo Regatta Course.

== Schedule ==
The schedule is as follows:

Date	Time	Round
Friday 22 August 2025	08:30	Heats
Saturday 23 August 2025	09:10	Semifinal
Sunday 24 August 2025	09:55	Final B
Sunday 24 August 2025	10:34	Final A

== Results ==
=== Heats ===
The fastest six boats in each heat, plus the three fastest seventh-place boats, advanced to the semifinals.

==== Heat 1 ====
Rank	Canoeist	Country	Time	Notes
1	Khasan Kuldashev	Uzbekistan	41.56	QS
2	Juan Valle	Spain	41.68	QS
3	John Wallace	United States	42.72	QS
4	Gabriel Ferron-Bouius	Canada	43.76	QS
5	Arnon Muenwiset	Thailand	48.52	QS
6	Cristian Piazza	Italy	48.81	QS
7	Mariano Leonardo Turner	Argentina	49.55	
8	Panagiotis Tyrimou	Cyprus	1:00.16	
9	Gregory Pink	Singapore	1:22.76	

==== Heat 2 ====
Rank	Canoeist	Country	Time	Notes
1	Dylan Littlehales	Australia	41.52	QS
2	Brahim Guendouz	Algeria	42.52	QS
3	Finn Murphy	New Zealand	42.92	QS
4	Gabin Keirel	France	43.21	QS
5	Ron Halevi	Israel	44.33	QS
6	Manish Kaurav	India	45.60	QS
7	Strahinja Bukvić	Serbia	46.15	qS
8	Gergo Dancs	Hungary	47.31	
9	Vajith Valsan	India	48.91	

==== Heat 3 ====
Rank	Canoeist	Country	Time	Notes
1	Leonid Krylov	Individual Neutral Athletes	40.80	QS
2	Gabriel Paixao Porto	Brazil	41.26	QS
3	Robert Oliver	Great Britain	41.67	QS
4	Choi Yong-beom	South Korea	43.46	QS
5	Erik Kiss	Hungary	44.28	QS
6	Zheng Lijian	China	45.43	QS
7	Khasan Sulaymonov	Uzbekistan	45.76	qS
8	Yuhei Hayashi	Japan	53.09	

==== Heat 4 ====
Rank	Canoeist	Country	Time	Notes
1	Serhii Yemelianov	Georgia	40.51	QS
2	Miquéias Elias Rodrigues	Brazil	40.79	QS
3	Jonathan Young	Great Britain	43.12	QS
4	Andrii Syvykh	Ukraine	43.38	QS
5	Oleksandr Nedashkovskyi	Ukraine	44.31	QS
6	Osman Kestan	Individual Neutral Athletes	44.42	QS
7	Zhalgas Taikenov	Kazakhstan	45.20	qS
8	Hwang Seung-oh	South Korea	46.31	

=== Semifinal ===
The fastest three boats in each semi advanced to the A final. The next three fastest boats in each semi advanced to the B final.

==== Semifinal 1 ====
Rank	Canoeist	Country	Time	Notes
1	Serhii Yemelianov	Georgia	41.23	FA
2	Dylan Littlehales	Australia	41.72	FA
3	Choi Yong-beom	South Korea	42.47	FA
4	Juan Valle	Spain	42.50	FB
5	Robert Oliver	Great Britain	42.81	FB
6	Oleksandr Nedashkovskyi	Ukraine	45.58	FB
7	Zhalgas Taikenov	Kazakhstan	45.70	
8	Manish Kaurav	India	45.92	
9	Cristian Piazza	Italy	49.87	

==== Semifinal 2 ====
Rank	Canoeist	Country	Time	Notes
1	Miquéias Elias Rodrigues	Brazil	41.49	FA
2	Leonid Krylov	Individual Neutral Athletes	42.53	FA
3	Finn Murphy	New Zealand	42.88	FA
4	John Wallace	United States	43.07	FB
5	Andrii Syvykh	Ukraine	43.59	FB
6	Gabin Keirel	France	44.37	FB
7	Zheng Lijian	China	45.68	
8	Khasan Sulaymonov	Uzbekistan	47.34	
9	Arnon Muenwiset	Thailand	49.99	

==== Semifinal 3 ====
Rank	Canoeist	Country	Time	Notes
1	Gabriel Paixao Porto	Brazil	41.67	FA
2	Brahim Guendouz	Algeria	42.64	FA
3	Khasan Kuldashev	Uzbekistan	43.81	FA
4	Gabriel Ferron-Bouius	Canada	44.00	FB
5	Erik Kiss	Hungary	44.22	FB
6	Jonathan Young	Great Britain	44.30	FB
7	Ron Halevi	Israel	44.48	
8	Osman Kestan	Individual Neutral Athletes	45.54	
9	Strahinja Bukvić	Serbia	46.93	

=== Finals ===
==== Final B ====
Competitors in this final raced for positions 10 to 18.

Rank	Canoeist	Country	Time	Notes
1	Robert Oliver	Great Britain	42.58	
2	Juan Valle	Spain	42.84	
3	John Wallace	United States	43.07	
4	Jonathan Young	Great Britain	43.59	
5	Gabin Keirel	France	43.83	
6	Andrii Syvykh	Ukraine	44.17	
7	Erik Kiss	Hungary	44.27	
8	Gabriel Ferron-Bouius	Canada	44.48	
9	Oleksandr Nedashkovskyi	Ukraine	45.33	

==== Final A ====
Competitors raced for positions 1 to 9, with medals going to the top three.

Rank	Canoeist	Country	Time	Notes
1st place, gold medalist(s)	Serhii Yemelianov	Georgia	40.31	
2nd place, silver medalist(s)	Miquéias Elias Rodrigues	Brazil	41.29	
3rd place, bronze medalist(s)	Dylan Littlehales	Australia	41.33	
4	Gabriel Paixao Porto	Brazil	41.37	
5	Choi Yong-beom	South Korea	41.44	
6	Leonid Krylov	Individual Neutral Athletes	41.50	
7	Khasan Kuldashev	Uzbekistan	42.10	
8	Brahim Guendouz	Algeria	42.42	
9	Finn Murphy	New Zealand	43.48	
