= 2025 ICF Canoe Sprint World Championships – Men's VL3 =

Men's VL3 at the 2025 ICF Canoe Sprint World Championships
- Venue: Idroscalo Regatta Course
- Location: Milan, Italy
- Dates: 20–23 August
- Competitors: 20 from 17 nations
- Winning time: 47.25

Medalists
gold medal	Pu Yi	China
silver medal	Turabek Nazarkulov	Uzbekistan
bronze medal	Giovane Vieira de Paula	Brazil

The men's VL3 200 metres competition at the 2025 ICF Canoe Sprint World Championships in Milan took place in Idroscalo Regatta Course.

== Schedule ==
The schedule is as follows:

Date	Time	Round
Wednesday 20 August 2025	15:58	Heats
Friday 22 August 2025	09:15	Semifinals
Saturday 23 August 2025	13:25	Final B
Saturday 23 August 2025	15:12	Final A

== Results ==
=== Heats ===
The fastest boat in each heat advanced directly to the final (QF). The next six fastest boats in each heat advanced to the semifinal (QS).

==== Heat 1 ====
Rank	Canoeist	Country	Time	Notes
1	Peter Cowan	New Zealand	47.46	QF
2	Pu Yi	China	48.04	QS
3	Turabek Nazarkulov	Uzbekistan	48.50	QS
4	Arturo Edwards	Chile	50.31	QS
5	Mirko Nicoli	Italy	50.57	QS
6	Roman Terennik	Israel	53.42	QS
7	Shoichi Asahi	Japan	1:05.46	QS

==== Heat 2 ====
Rank	Canoeist	Country	Time	Notes
1	Jack Eyers	Great Britain	47.10	QF
2	Emilio Ariel Atamanuk	Argentina	47.36	QS
3	Zakhar Nazarenko	Individual Neutral Athletes	47.73	QS
4	Adrian Mosquera	Spain	47.87	QS
5	Gervais Aumeran	France	49.89	QS
6	Jai Deep Jai Deep	India	51.36	QS
	Mohamad Khirmern	Singapore	DSQ	

==== Heat 3 ====
Rank	Canoeist	Country	Time	Notes
1	Giovane Vieira de Paula	Brazil	47.41	QF
2	Abel Aber	France	48.61	QS
3	Stuart Wood	Great Britain	48.73	QS
4	Khaytmurot Sherkuziev	Uzbekistan	48.89	QS
5	Maksim Popov	Individual Neutral Athletes	50.41	QS
6	Patipol Thippaphathanat	Thailand	54.37	QS

=== Semifinals ===
The fastest three boats in each semi advanced to the A final. The next four fastest boats in each semi and best 8th advanced to the final B.

==== Semifinal 1 ====
Rank	Canoeist	Country	Time	Notes
1	Pu Yi	China	47.92	FA
2	Khaytmurot Sherkuziev	Uzbekistan	49.51	FA
3	Zakhar Nazarenko	Individual Neutral Athletes	49.55	FA
4	Stuart Wood	Great Britain	49.63	FB
5	Arturo Edwards	Chile	49.94	FB
6	Gervais Aumeran	France	50.64	FB
7	Roman Terennik	Israel	53.41	FB
8	Patipol Thippaphathanat	Thailand	54.97	fB

==== Semifinal 2 ====
Rank	Canoeist	Country	Time	Notes
1	Emilio Ariel Atamanuk	Argentina	48.87	FA
2	Turabek Nazarkulov	Uzbekistan	48.90	FA
3	Adrian Mosquera	Spain	49.46	FA
4	Abel Aber	France	49.90	FB
5	Mirko Nicoli	Italy	50.75	FB
6	Maksim Popov	Individual Neutral Athletes	51.89	FB
7	Jai Deep Jai Deep	India	53.41	FB
8	Shoichi Asahi	Japan	1:05.01	

=== Finals ===
==== Final B ====
Competitors in this final raced for positions 10 to 18.

Rank	Canoeist	Country	Time	Notes
1	Abel Aber	France	49.02	
2	Stuart Wood	Great Britain	49.92	
3	Arturo Edwards	Chile	50.30	
4	Mirko Nicoli	Italy	50.40	
5	Gervais Aumeran	France	50.56	
6	Maksim Popov	Individual Neutral Athletes	51.92	
7	Jai Deep Jai Deep	India	52.00	
8	Roman Terennik	Israel	53.18	
9	Patipol Thippaphathanat	Thailand	55.54	

==== Final A ====
Competitors raced for positions 1 to 9, with medals going to the top three.

Rank	Canoeist	Country	Time	Notes
1st place, gold medalist(s)	Pu Yi	China	47.25	
2nd place, silver medalist(s)	Turabek Nazarkulov	Uzbekistan	47.28	
3rd place, bronze medalist(s)	Giovane Vieira de Paula	Brazil	47.50	
4	Peter Cowan	New Zealand	47.54	
5	Zakhar Nazarenko	Individual Neutral Athletes	48.49	
6	Emilio Ariel Atamanuk	Argentina	48.53	
7	Adrian Mosquera	Spain	49.07	
8	Khaytmurot Sherkuziev	Uzbekistan	49.37	
9	Jack Eyers	Great Britain	49.42	
