= 2023 ICF Canoe Sprint World Championships – Men's VL3 =

Men's VL3 at the 2023 ICF Canoe Sprint World Championships
- Venue: Sportpark Duisburg
- Location: Duisburg, Germany
- Dates: 23–25 August
- Competitors: 30 from 20 nations
- Winning time: 48.238

Medalists
gold medal	Vladyslav Yepifanov	Ukraine
silver medal	Jack Eyers	Great Britain
bronze medal	Curtis McGrath	Australia

The men's VL3 competition at the 2023 ICF Canoe Sprint World Championships in Duisburg took place at Sportpark Duisburg.

== Schedule ==
The schedule was as follows:

Date	Time	Round
Thursday 24 August 2023	11:35	Heats
Saturday 26 August 2023	16:35	Semifinals
Sunday 27 August 2023	10:06	Final B
Sunday 27 August 2023	11:12	Final A

All times are Central European Summer Time (UTC+2)

== Results ==
=== Heats ===
The six fastest boats in each heat and three fastest 7th ranked boats advanced directly to the semi finals.

==== Heat 1 ====
Rank	Name	Country	Time	Notes
1	Jack Eyers	Great Britain	47.542	QS
2	Peter Cowan	New Zealand	47.950	QS
3	Arturo Edwards	Chile	49.937	QS
4	Markus Swoboda	Austria	50.267	QS
5	Mark Daniels	Australia	52.681	QS
6	Sanjeev Kotiya	India	57.232	QS
7	Artur Petrosyan	Armenia	58.320	qS
–	Duan Yuguo	China	DSQ	

==== Heat 2 ====
Rank	Name	Country	Time	Notes
1	Vladyslav Yepifanov	Ukraine	47.269	QS
2	Giovane Vieira de Paula	Brazil	48.661	QS
3	Mirko Nicoli	Italy	48.904	QS
4	Turabek Nazarkulov	Uzbekistan	49.814	QS
5	Scott Martlew	New Zealand	49.878	QS
6	Kapil Kumar	India	55.905	QS
7	Patipol Thippaphathanat	Thailand	57.221	qS
8	Ahmed Naguib	Egypt	1:09.521	

==== Heat 3 ====
Rank	Name	Country	Time	Notes
1	Khaytmurot Sherkuziev	Uzbekistan	48.067	QS
2	Curtis McGrath	Australia	48.268	QS
3	Emilio Atamañuk	Argentina	49.215	QS
4	Robert Wydera	Poland	49.956	QS
5	Pu Yi	China	51.321	QS
6	Martin Diatta	Senegal	55.649	QS
7	Roman Terennik	Israel	57.949	qS

==== Heat 4 ====
Rank	Name	Country	Time	Notes
1	Stuart Wood	Great Britain	48.401	QS
2	Adrian Mosquera	Spain	48.704	QS
3	Abel Aber	France	48.778	QS
4	Nicolás Crosta	Argentina	51.008	QS
5	Jai Deep	India	51.343	QS
6	Franco Gutiérrez	Chile	55.717	QS
–	Samuel Dagba	Nigeria	DNS	

=== Semifinals ===
The fastest three boats in each semi advanced to the A final.
The next three fastest boats in each semi advanced to the B final.

==== Semifinal 1 ====
Rank	Name	Country	Time	Notes
1	Curtis McGrath	Australia	47.814	QA
2	Abel Aber	France	48.024	QA
3	Jack Eyers	Great Britain	48.327	QA
4	Giovane Vieira de Paula	Brazil	48.502	QB
5	Pu Yi	China	50.839	QB
6	Nicolás Crosta	Argentina	50.863	QB
7	Mark Daniels	Australia	53.230	
8	Patipol Thippaphathanat	Thailand	57.656	
–	Kapil Kumar	India	DNS	

==== Semifinal 2 ====
Rank	Name	Country	Time	Notes
1	Vladyslav Yepifanov	Ukraine	47.747	QA
2	Emilio Atamañuk	Argentina	48.731	QA
3	Adrian Mosquera	Spain	49.036	QA
4	Markus Swoboda	Austria	49.645	QB
5	Arturo Edwards	Chile	50.000	QB
6	Robert Wydera	Poland	50.478	QB
7	Scott Martlew	New Zealand	51.405	
8	Franco Gutiérrez	Chile	56.682	
–	Roman Terennik	Israel	DNS	

==== Semifinal 3 ====
Rank	Name	Country	Time	Notes
1	Khaytmurot Sherkuziev	Uzbekistan	48.147	QA
2	Peter Cowan	New Zealand	49.267	QA
3	Stuart Wood	Great Britain	49.500	QA
4	Mirko Nicoli	Italy	50.490	QB
5	Jai Deep	India	50.628	QB
6	Turabek Nazarkulov	Uzbekistan	51.055	QB
7	Sanjeev Kotiya	India	55.894	
8	Martin Diatta	Senegal	57.193	
9	Artur Petrosyan	Armenia	58.023	

=== Finals ===
==== Final B ====
Competitors in this final raced for positions 10 to 18.

Rank	Name	Country	Time
1	Giovane Vieira de Paula	Brazil	49.514
2	Markus Swoboda	Austria	49.992
3	Jai Deep	India	50.333
4	Robert Wydera	Poland	50.378
5	Mirko Nicoli	Italy	50.732
6	Arturo Edwards	Chile	51.181
7	Turabek Nazarkulov	Uzbekistan	51.558
8	Nicolás Crosta	Argentina	51.624
9	Pu Yi	China	51.973

==== Final A ====
Competitors in this final raced for positions 1 to 9, with medals going to the top three.

Rank	Name	Country	Time
1st place, gold medalist(s)	Vladyslav Yepifanov	Ukraine	48.238
2nd place, silver medalist(s)	Jack Eyers	Great Britain	48.602
3rd place, bronze medalist(s)	Curtis McGrath	Australia	48.879
4	Khaytmurot Sherkuziev	Uzbekistan	49.185
5	Stuart Wood	Great Britain	49.233
6	Emilio Atamañuk	Argentina	49.970
7	Adrián Mosquera	Spain	49.985
8	Abel Aber	France	50.094
9	Peter Cowan	New Zealand	51.452
