= 2024 ICF Paracanoe World Championships – Men's VL3 =

Men's VL3 at the 2024 ICF Paracanoe World Championships
- Venue: Olympic Centre of Szeged
- Location: Szeged, Hungary
- Dates: 9–11 May
- Competitors: 31 from 23 nations
- Winning time: 47.80

Medalists
gold medal	Vladyslav Yepifanov	Ukraine
silver medal	Peter Cowan	New Zealand
bronze medal	Curtis McGrath	Australia

The men's VL3 competition at the 2024 ICF Paracanoe World Championships in Szeged took place at the Olympic Centre of Szeged.

== Schedule ==
The schedule was as follows:

Date	Time	Round
Thursday 9 May 2024	15:30	Heats
Friday 10 May 2024	8:55	Semifinals
Saturday 11 May 2024	11:22	Final A
Saturday 11 May 2024	11:34	Final B

All times are Central European Summer Time (UTC+2)

== Results ==
=== Heats ===
The fastest six boats in each heat, plus the three fastest seventh-place boats, advanced to the semi-finals.

==== Heat 1 ====
Rank	Name	Country	Time	Notes
1	Vladyslav Yepifanov	Ukraine	46.73	QS
2	Peter Cowan	New Zealand	46.96	QS
3	Abel Aber	France	48.99	QS
4	Pu Yi	China	49.05	QS
5	Nicolás Crosta	Argentina	52.63	QS
6	Maik Polte	Germany	53.21	QS
7	Hiromi Tatsumi	Japan	54.93	qS
8	Martin Dobrev	Austria	59.06	

==== Heat 2 ====
Rank	Name	Country	Time	Notes
1	Giovane Vieira de Paula	Brazil	48.67	QS
2	Adrian Mosquera	Spain	49.54	QS
3	Arturo Edwards	Chile	50.49	QS
4	Jack Eyers	Great Britain	50.98	QS
5	Roman Terennik	Israel	53.37	QS
6	Martin Diatta	Senegal	53.80	QS
7	Patipol Thippaphathanat	Thailand	55.85	
8	Omar Farag	Egypt	1:14.76	

==== Heat 3 ====
Rank	Name	Country	Time	Notes
1	Curtis McGrath	Australia	47.82	QS
2	Mirko Nicoli	Italy	48.65	QS
2	Emilio Atamañuk	Argentina	48.65	QS
4	Bibarys Spatay	Kazakhstan	49.44	QS
5	Koichi Imai	Japan	50.65	QS
6	Tcharles Tiago Besing	Brazil	51.06	QS
7	Henadzi Kuzura	AIN	54.47	qS

==== Heat 4 ====
Rank	Name	Country	Time	Notes
1	Stuart Wood	Great Britain	48.02	QS
2	Khaytmurot Sherkuziev	Uzbekistan	48.29	QS
3	Robert Wydera	Poland	49.85	QS
4	Jai Deep	India	50.72	QS
5	Javier Reja Muñoz	Spain	51.60	QS
6	Eddie Potdevin	France	52.63	QS
7	Mark Daniels	Australia	53.59	qS
–	Sergio Cabrera	Argentina	DNS	

=== Semifinals ===
The fastest three boats in each semi advanced to the A final.
The next three fastest boats in each semi advanced to the B final.

==== Semifinal 1 ====
Rank	Name	Country	Time	Notes
1	Vladyslav Yepifanov	Ukraine	50.76	QA
2	Emilio Atamañuk	Argentina	52.28	QA
3	Adrian Mosquera	Spain	53.38	QA
4	Robert Wydera	Poland	53.63	QB
5	Jai Deep	India	54.98	QB
6	Koichi Imai	Japan	56.20	QB
7	Mark Daniels	Australia	57.37	
8	Nicolás Crosta	Argentina	57.56	
9	Martin Diatta	Senegal	1:00.07	

==== Semifinal 2 ====
Rank	Name	Country	Time	Notes
1	Khaytmurot Sherkuziev	Uzbekistan	52.76	QA
2	Mirko Nicoli	Italy	52.91	QA
3	Pu Yi	China	53.35	QA
4	Abel Aber	France	53.66	QB
5	Giovane Vieira de Paula	Brazil	53.90	QB
6	Bibarys Spatay	Kazakhstan	54.73	QB
7	Eddie Potdevin	France	55.97	
8	Henadzi Kuzura	AIN	59.36	
9	Roman Terennik	Israel	1:00.84	

==== Semifinal 3 ====
Rank	Name	Country	Time	Notes
1	Peter Cowan	New Zealand	50.88	QA
2	Curtis McGrath	Australia	51.08	QA
3	Stuart Wood	Great Britain	52.67	QA
4	Jack Eyers	Great Britain	53.21	QB
5	Tcharles Tiago Besing	Brazil	54.67	QB
6	Javier Reja Muñoz	Spain	54.68	QB
7	Arturo Edwards	Chile	54.75	
8	Maik Polte	Germany	57.77	
9	Hiromi Tatsumi	Japan	1:01.16	

=== Finals ===
==== Final B ====
Competitors raced for positions 10 to 18.

Rank	Name	Country	Time
1	Jack Eyers	Great Britain	47.17
2	Abel Aber	France	47.78
3	Giovane Vieira de Paula	Brazil	48.35
4	Bibarys Spatay	Kazakhstan	48.44
5	Robert Wydera	Poland	48.56
6	Jai Deep	India	49.07
7	Tcharles Tiago Besing	Brazil	50.27
8	Koichi Imai	Japan	50.45
9	Javier Reja Muñoz	Spain	51.25

==== Final A ====
Competitors raced for positions 1 to 9, with medals going to the top three.

Rank	Name	Country	Time
1st place, gold medalist(s)	Vladyslav Yepifanov	Ukraine	47.80
2nd place, silver medalist(s)	Peter Cowan	New Zealand	48.51
3rd place, bronze medalist(s)	Curtis McGrath	Australia	48.99
4	Emilio Atamañuk	Argentina	49.57
5	Stuart Wood	Great Britain	49.73
6	Khaytmurot Sherkuziev	Uzbekistan	49.93
7	Adrian Mosquera	Spain	49.95
8	Mirko Nicoli	Italy	50.11
9	Pu Yi	China	50.57
