= Canoe at the 2020 Summer Paralympics – Men's KL3 =

Men's KL3 at the XVI Paralympic Games
- Venue: Sea Forest Waterway
- Dates: 2–3 September 2021
- Competitors: 14 from 12 nations

Medalists
1st place, gold medalist(s)		Serhii Yemelianov	Ukraine
2nd place, silver medalist(s)		Leonid Krylov	RPC
3rd place, bronze medalist(s)		Robert Oliver	Great Britain

The Canoe Sprint men's KL3 event at the 2020 Paralympic Games took place on 2 and 3 September 2021. Two initial heats were held. Winners advanced directly to the final. The rest went into one of two semifinals, where the top three in each semifinal also advanced to the final.

== Schedule ==
Date	Time	Round
Thursday, 2 September 2021	10:00	Heats
Friday, 3 September 2021	10:12	Semifinals
Friday, 3 September 2021	11:36	Finals

== Results ==
=== Heats ===
Heat 1

Rank	Lane	Name	Nationality	Time	Notes
1	5	Serhii Yemelianov	Ukraine	40.776	FA
2	2	Caio Ribeiro de Carvalho	Brazil	41.687	SF
3	3	Tom Kierey	Germany	42.098	SF
4	7	Mateusz Surwilo	Poland	43.373	SF
5	4	Patrick O'Leary	Ireland	43.502	SF
6	6	Kwadzo Klokpah	Italy	44.217	SF
7	6	Adrián Mosquera	Spain	49.740	SF

Heat 2

Rank	Lane	Name	Nationality	Time	Notes
1	1	Leonid Krylov	RPC	40.318	FA
2	7	Dylan Littlehales	Australia	41.428	SF
3	5	Robert Oliver	Great Britain	41.820	SF
4	4	Juan Valle	Spain	42.337	SF
5	6	Erik Kiss	Hungary	42.864	SF
6	3	Corbin Hart	New Zealand	43.538	SF
7	2	Giovane Vieira de Paula	Brazil	44.144	SF

=== Semifinals ===
Semifinal 1

Rank	Lane	Name	Nationality	Time	Notes
1	5	Caio Ribeiro de Carvalho	Brazil	40.717	FA
2	4	Robert Oliver	Great Britain	41.102	FA
3	3	Erik Kiss	Hungary	42.033	FA
4	6	Mateusz Surwilo	Poland	42.153	FB
5	7	Kwadzo Klokpah	Italy	42.398	FB
6	2	Giovane Vieira de Paula	Brazil	45.556	FB

Semifinal 2

Rank	Lane	Name	Nationality	Time	Notes
1	5	Dylan Littlehales	Australia	40.234	FA
2	6	Juan Valle	Spain	41.469	FA
3	4	Tom Kierey	Germany	41.647	FA
4	3	Patrick O'Leary	Ireland	42.203	FB
5	7	Corbin Hart	New Zealand	42.290	FB
6	2	Adrián Mosquera	Spain	46.778	FB

=== Finals ===
Final B

Rank	Lane	Name	Nationality	Time	Notes
9	5	Patrick O'Leary	Ireland	42.416	
10	4	Mateusz Surwilo	Poland	42.612	
11	6	Kwadzo Klokpah	Italy	42.854	
12	2	Giovane Vieira de Paula	Brazil	43.508	
13	3	Corbin Hart	New Zealand	44.182	
14	7	Adrián Mosquera	Spain	47.642	

Final A

Rank	Lane	Name	Nationality	Time	Notes
1st place, gold medalist(s)	4	Serhii Yemelianov	Ukraine	40.355	
2nd place, silver medalist(s)	5	Leonid Krylov	RPC	40.464	
3rd place, bronze medalist(s)	7	Robert Oliver	Great Britain	41.268	
4	6	Dylan Littlehales	Australia	41.280	
5	3	Caio Ribeiro de Carvalho	Brazil	42.005	
6	8	Tom Kierey	Germany	42.155	
7	2	Juan Valle	Spain	42.513	
8	1	Erik Kiss	Hungary	44.210	
