= 2026 ICF Canoe Sprint World Championships – Men's VL3 =

Men's VL3 at the 2026 ICF Canoe Sprint World Championships
- Venue: Lake Malta
- Location: Poznań, Poland
- Dates: 26–29 August
- Winning time: 46.48

Medalists
gold medal	Pu Yi	China
silver medal	Vladyslav Yepifanov	Ukraine
bronze medal	Stuart Wood	Great Britain

The men's VL3 competition at the 2026 ICF Canoe Sprint World Championships in Poznań took place at Lake Malta.

== Schedule ==
The schedule is as follows:

Date	Time	Round
Wednesday 26 August 2026	17:29	Heats
Friday 28 August 2026	09:15	Semifinals
Saturday 29 August 2026	13:45	Final B
Saturday 29 August 2026	15:42	Final A

=== Finals ===
Competitors raced for positions 1 to 9, with medals going to the top three.

Rank	Lane	Name	Nation	Time	Gap
1st place, gold medalist(s)	6	Pu Yi	China	46.48	
2nd place, silver medalist(s)	4	Vladyslav Yepifanov	Ukraine	46.76	+0.28
3rd place, bronze medalist(s)	7	Stuart Wood	Great Britain	46.95	+0.47
4	8	Turabek Nazarkulov	Uzbekistan	47.15	+0.67
5	3	Giovane Vieira de Paula	Brazil	47.47	+0.99
6	5	Peter Cowan	New Zealand	47.69	+1.21
7	2	Zakhar Nazarenko	Individual Neutral Athletes-A	48.71	+2.23
8	9	Khaytmurot Sherkuziev	Uzbekistan	49.47	+2.99
9	1	Jean Carlos Panucci Benites	Brazil	50.34	+3.86
