= 2024 ICF Paracanoe World Championships – Men's KL3 =

Men's KL3 at the 2024 ICF Paracanoe World Championships
- Venue: Olympic Centre of Szeged
- Location: Szeged, Hungary
- Dates: 10–11 May
- Competitors: 30 from 24 nations
- Winning time: 40.17

Medalists
gold medal	Juan Valle	Spain
silver medal	Dylan Littlehales	Australia
bronze medal	Miquéias Elias Rodrigues	Brazil

The men's KL3 competition at the 2024 ICF Paracanoe World Championships in Szeged took place at the Olympic Centre of Szeged.

== Schedule ==
The schedule was as follows:

Date	Time	Round
Friday 10 May 2024	17:08	Heats
Saturday 11 May 2024	9:20	Semifinals
Saturday 11 May 2024	13:51	Final B
Saturday 11 May 2024	15:23	Final A

All times are Central European Summer Time (UTC+2)

== Results ==
=== Heats ===
The fastest six boats in each heat, plus the three fastest seventh-place boats, advanced to the semi-finals.

==== Heat 1 ====
Rank	Name	Country	Time	Notes
1	Dylan Littlehales	Australia	42.33	QS
2	Edmond Sanka	Senegal	42.99	QS
3	Jean Carlos Panucci Benites	Brazil	43.40	QS
4	Corbin Hart	New Zealand	43.69	QS
5	Andrii Syvykh	Ukraine	44.17	QS
6	Lu Xiaocong	China	48.47	QS
7	Omar Farag	Egypt	50.25	qS

==== Heat 2 ====
Rank	Name	Country	Time	Notes
1	Miquéias Elias Rodrigues	Brazil	43.41	QS
2	Jonathan Young	Great Britain	43.66	QS
3	Khasan Kuldashev	Uzbekistan	44.64	QS
4	John Wallace	United States	45.37	QS
5	Gabin Keirel	France	45.47	QS
6	Hwang Seung-oh	South Korea	47.04	QS
7	Martin Dobrev	Austria	54.84	

==== Heat 3 ====
Rank	Name	Country	Time	Notes
1	Choi Yong-beom	South Korea	42.52	QS
2	Brahim Guendouz	Algeria	43.40	QS
3	Kwadzo Klokpah	Italy	43.81	QS
4	Erik Kiss	Hungary	44.62	QS
5	Gabriel Ferron-Bouius	Canada	45.19	QS
6	Nicolás Martínez	Spain	45.89	QS
7	Masood Gheisari	Iran	47.38	qS
8	Noureldin Ramadan	Egypt	47.58	

==== Heat 4 ====
Rank	Name	Country	Time	Notes
1	Juan Valle	Spain	41.74	QS
2	Robert Oliver	Great Britain	42.06	QS
3	Mateusz Surwiło	Poland	43.14	QS
4	Ron Halevi	Israel	44.26	QS
5	Zhalgas Taikenov	Kazakhstan	44.42	QS
6	Manish Kaurav	India	45.26	QS
7	Mark Daniels	Australia	47.70	qS
8	Nicolás Crosta	Argentina	48.93	

=== Semifinals ===
The fastest three boats in each semi advanced to the A final.
The next three fastest boats in each semi advanced to the B final.

==== Semifinal 1 ====
Rank	Canoeist	Country	Time	Notes
1	Dylan Littlehales	Australia	40.58	QA
2	Brahim Guendouz	Algeria	41.02	QA
3	Jonathan Young	Great Britain	41.22	QA
4	Mateusz Surwiło	Poland	41.37	QB
5	Andrii Syvykh	Ukraine	42.12	QB
6	Ron Halevi	Israel	42.34	QB
7	Gabriel Ferron-Bouius	Canada	43.35	
8	Masood Gheisari	Iran	44.52	
9	Hwang Seung-oh	South Korea	45.64	

==== Semifinal 2 ====
Rank	Canoeist	Country	Time	Notes
1	Miquéias Elias Rodrigues	Brazil	40.46	QA
2	Robert Oliver	Great Britain	41.00	QA
3	Jean Carlos Panucci Benites	Brazil	41.07	QA
4	Erik Kiss	Hungary	41.86	QB
5	Corbin Hart	New Zealand	41.94	QB
6	Kwadzo Klokpah	Italy	42.08	QB
7	Gabin Keirel	France	42.70	
8	Manish Kaurav	India	44.62	
9	Mark Daniels	Australia	46.94	

==== Semifinal 3 ====
Rank	Canoeist	Country	Time	Notes
1	Juan Valle	Spain	40.50	QA
2	Edmond Sanka	Senegal	41.09	QA
3	Choi Yong-beom	South Korea	41.13	QA
4	Khasan Kuldashev	Uzbekistan	41.23	QB
5	John Wallace	United States	42.59	QB
6	Zhalgas Taikenov	Kazakhstan	43.16	QB
7	Nicolás Martínez	Spain	43.55	
8	Lu Xiaocong	China	46.70	
9	Omar Farag	Egypt	47.79	

=== Finals ===
==== Final B ====
Competitors raced for positions 10 to 18.

Rank	Name	Country	Time
1	Mateusz Surwiło	Poland	41.26
2	Khasan Kuldashev	Uzbekistan	41.50
3	John Wallace	United States	41.51
4	Ron Halevi	Israel	41.57
5	Erik Kiss	Hungary	41.77
6	Corbin Hart	New Zealand	41.78
7	Kwadzo Klokpah	Italy	42.12
8	Andrii Syvykh	Ukraine	42.44
9	Zhalgas Taikenov	Kazakhstan	43.09

==== Final A ====
Competitors raced for positions 1 to 9, with medals going to the top three.

Rank	Name	Country	Time
1st place, gold medalist(s)	Juan Valle	Spain	40.17
2nd place, silver medalist(s)	Dylan Littlehales	Australia	40.27
3rd place, bronze medalist(s)	Miquéias Elias Rodrigues	Brazil	40.40
4	Edmond Sanka	Senegal	40.54
5	Robert Oliver	Great Britain	40.98
6	Jonathan Young	Great Britain	41.07
7	Choi Yong-beom	South Korea	41.08
8	Jean Carlos Panucci Benites	Brazil	41.24
9	Brahim Guendouz	Algeria	41.58
