= 2021 ICF Canoe Sprint World Championships – Men's VL3 =

Men's VL3 at the 2021 ICF Canoe Sprint World Championships
- Venue: Lake Bagsværd
- Location: Copenhagen, Denmark
- Dates: 16–17 September
- Competitors: 20 from 13 nations
- Winning time: 50.01

Medalists
gold medal	Jack Eyers	Great Britain
silver medal	Stuart Wood	Great Britain
bronze medal	Vladyslav Yepifanov	Ukraine

The men's VL3 competition at the 2021 ICF Canoe Sprint World Championships in Copenhagen took place on Lake Bagsværd.

== Schedule ==
The schedule was as follows:

Date	Time	Round
Thursday 16 September 2021	15:40	Heats
Friday 17 September 2021	11:00	Semifinals
Friday 17 September 2021	15:30	Final B
Friday 17 September 2021	15:47	Final A

All times are Central European Summer Time (UTC+2)

== Results ==
=== Heats ===
Heat winners advanced directly to the A final.
The next six fastest boats in each heat advanced to the semifinals.

==== Heat 1 ====
Rank	Name	Country	Time	Notes
1	Jack Eyers	Great Britain	50.32	QA
2	Emilio Atamañuk	Argentina	50.86	QS
3	Markus Swoboda	Austria	50.96	QS
4	Adrián Mosquera	Spain	52.44	QS
5	Caio Ribeiro de Carvalho	Brazil	52.61	QS
6	Tomasz Moździerski	Poland	52.70	QS
–	Manish Kaurav	India	DNS	

==== Heat 2 ====
Rank	Name	Country	Time	Notes
1	Stuart Wood	Great Britain	50.68	QA
2	Eddie Potdevin	France	52.36	QS
3	Maksim Popov	RCF	53.95	QS
4	Nicolás Crosta	Argentina	55.95	QS
5	Koichi Imai	Japan	56.17	QS
6	Robert Wydera	Poland	59.03	QS
7	Allgower Maruae	Tahiti	1:00.05	QS

==== Heat 3 ====
Rank	Name	Country	Time	Notes
1	Vladyslav Yepifanov	Ukraine	50.33	QA
2	Giovane Vieira de Paula	Brazil	51.31	QS
3	Egor Firsov	RCF	52.97	QS
4	Javier Reja Muñoz	Spain	53.38	QS
5	Mirko Nicoli	Italy	55.31	QS
6	Abel Aber	France	55.99	QS

=== Semifinals ===
Qualification was as follows:

The fastest three boats in each semi advanced to the A final.
The next four fastest boats in each semi, plus the fastest remaining boat advanced to the B final.

==== Semifinal 1 ====
Rank	Name	Country	Time	Notes
1	Markus Swoboda	Austria	51.50	QA
2	Caio Ribeiro de Carvalho	Brazil	51.80	QA
3	Giovane Vieira de Paula	Brazil	52.13	QA
4	Javier Reja Muñoz	Spain	53.30	QB
5	Tomasz Moździerski	Poland	53.73	QB
6	Maksim Popov	RCF	54.42	QB
7	Nicolás Crosta	Argentina	56.47	QB
8	Robert Wydera	Poland	59.74	

==== Semifinal 2 ====
Rank	Name	Country	Time	Notes
1	Eddie Potdevin	France	50.59	QA
2	Emilio Atamañuk	Argentina	51.23	QA
3	Adrián Mosquera	Spain	52.73	QA
4	Egor Firsov	RCF	53.39	QB
5	Mirko Nicoli	Italy	53.90	QB
6	Abel Aber	France	55.02	QB
7	Koichi Imai	Japan	56.28	QB
8	Allgower Maruae	Tahiti	58.99	qB

=== Finals ===
==== Final B ====
Competitors in this final raced for positions 10 to 18.

Rank	Name	Country	Time
1	Tomasz Moździerski	Poland	52.43
2	Egor Firsov	RCF	53.08
3	Javier Reja Muñoz	Spain	53.30
4	Maksim Popov	RCF	53.74
5	Abel Aber	France	54.47
6	Mirko Nicoli	Italy	54.72
7	Koichi Imai	Japan	55.35
8	Nicolás Crosta	Argentina	55.39
9	Allgower Maruae	Tahiti	58.02

==== Final A ====
Competitors raced for positions 1 to 9, with medals going to the top three.

Rank	Name	Country	Time
1st place, gold medalist(s)	Jack Eyers	Great Britain	50.01
2nd place, silver medalist(s)	Stuart Wood	Great Britain	50.13
3rd place, bronze medalist(s)	Vladyslav Yepifanov	Ukraine	50.55
4	Giovane Vieira de Paula	Brazil	51.04
5	Eddie Potdevin	France	51.04
6	Markus Swoboda	Austria	51.46
7	Emilio Atamañuk	Argentina	51.67
8	Caio Ribeiro de Carvalho	Brazil	52.27
9	Adrián Mosquera	Spain	53.25
