= 2022 ICF Canoe Sprint World Championships – Men's VL3 =

Men's VL3 at the 2022 ICF Canoe Sprint World Championships
- Venue: Lake Banook
- Location: Dartmouth, Canada
- Dates: 4–6 August
- Competitors: 22 from 17 nations
- Winning time: 47.13

Medalists
gold medal	Jack Eyers	Great Britain
silver medal	Vladyslav Yepifanov	Ukraine
bronze medal	Khaytmurot Sherkuziev	Uzbekistan

The men's VL3 competition at the 2022 ICF Canoe Sprint World Championships in Dartmouth took place on Lake Banook.

== Schedule ==
The schedule was as follows:

Date	Time	Round
Thursday 4 August 2022	10:20	Heats
Thursday 4 August 2022	16:00	Semifinals
Saturday 6 August 2022	10:04	Final B
Saturday 6 August 2022	10:44	Final A

All times are Atlantic Daylight Time (UTC−3)

== Results ==
=== Heats ===
The fastest boat in each heat advanced directly to the A final.
The next six fastest boats in each heat advanced to the semifinals.

==== Heat 1 ====
Rank	Canoeist	Country	Time	Notes
1	Jack Eyers	Great Britain	49.66	QA
2	Khaytmurot Sherkuziev	Uzbekistan	50.60	QS
3	Abel Aber	France	52.91	QF
4	Peter Cowan	New Zealand	53.43	QS
5	Nicolás Crosta	Argentina	54.03	QS
6	Javier Reja Muñoz	Spain	54.15	QS
7	David Waters	Canada	1:01.64	QS
8	Grotiuz Adan	Uruguay	1:11.11	

==== Heat 2 ====
Rank	Canoeist	Country	Time	Notes
1	Vladyslav Yepifanov	Ukraine	49.89	QA
2	Adrián Mosquera	Spain	51.60	QS
3	Robert Wydera	Poland	51.80	QS
4	Mirko Nicoli	Italy	52.20	QS
5	Arturo Edwards	Chile	53.12	QS
6	Hiromi Tatsumi	Japan	1:01.75	QS
7	Jorge Obispo	Uruguay	1:07.05	QS

==== Heat 3 ====
Rank	Canoeist	Country	Time	Notes
1	Emilio Atamañuk	Argentina	51.89	QA
2	Giovane Vieira de Paula	Brazil	52.18	QS
3	Martin Tweedie	Great Britain	53.33	QS
4	Patrick O'Leary	Ireland	53.81	QS
5	Jai Deep	India	54.90	QS
6	Koichi Imai	Japan	55.31	QS
7	Jamey Parks	United States	58.61	QS

=== Semifinals ===
The fastest three boats in each semi advanced to the A final.
The next four fastest boats in each semi, plus the fastest remaining boat advanced to the B final.

==== Semifinal 1 ====
Rank	Canoeist	Country	Time	Notes
1	Abel Aber	France	54.33	QA
2	Giovane Vieira de Paula	Brazil	54.37	QA
3	Javier Reja Muñoz	Spain	54.60	QA
4	Mirko Nicoli	Italy	55.65	QB
5	Robert Wydera	Poland	55.94	QB
6	Nicolás Crosta	Argentina	56.34	QB
7	Patrick O'Leary	Ireland	59.70	QB
8	Hiromi Tatsumi	Japan	1:00.64	qB
9	Jamey Parks	United States	1:02.51	

==== Semifinal 2 ====
Rank	Canoeist	Country	Time	Notes
1	Khaytmurot Sherkuziev	Uzbekistan	52.99	QA
2	Adrián Mosquera	Spain	53.78	QA
3	Peter Cowan	New Zealand	55.10	QA
4	Arturo Edwards	Chile	55.14	QB
5	Martin Tweedie	Great Britain	56.90	QB
6	Koichi Imai	Japan	56.91	QB
7	Jai Deep	India	59.44	QB
8	David Waters	Canada	1:04.95	
9	Jorge Obispo	Uruguay	1:08.82	

=== Finals ===
==== Final B ====
Competitors in this final raced for positions 10 to 18.

Rank	Name	Country	Time
1	Arturo Edwards	Chile	49.67
2	Patrick O'Leary	Ireland	50.04
3	Mirko Nicoli	Italy	50.48
4	Robert Wydera	Poland	50.67
5	Nicolás Crosta	Argentina	50.85
6	Martin Tweedie	Great Britain	50.96
7	Jai Deep	India	51.60
8	Koichi Imai	Japan	52.19
9	Hiromi Tatsumi	Japan	53.44

==== Final A ====
Competitors in this final raced for positions 1 to 9, with medals going to the top three.

Rank	Name	Country	Time
1st place, gold medalist(s)	Jack Eyers	Great Britain	47.13
2nd place, silver medalist(s)	Vladyslav Yepifanov	Ukraine	47.29
3rd place, bronze medalist(s)	Khaytmurot Sherkuziev	Uzbekistan	47.92
4	Adrián Mosquera	Spain	48.47
5	Abel Aber	France	49.07
6	Emilio Atamañuk	Argentina	49.52
7	Giovane Vieira de Paula	Brazil	49.77
8	Peter Cowan	New Zealand	50.43
9	Javier Reja Muñoz	Spain	52.28
