= 2026 ICF Canoe Sprint World Championships – Men's KL3 =

Men's KL3 at the 2026 ICF Canoe Sprint World Championships
- Venue: Lake Malta
- Location: Poznań, Poland
- Dates: 27–30 August
- Winning time: 39.82

Medalists
| gold medal | Serhii Yemelianov | Georgia |
| silver medal | Gabriel Paixao Porto | Brazil |
| bronze medal | Miquéias Elias Rodrigues | Brazil |

The men's KL3 competition at the 2026 ICF Canoe Sprint World Championships in Poznań took place at Lake Malta.

== Schedule ==
The schedule is as follows:

| Date | Time | Round |
|---|---|---|
| Thursday 27 August 2026 | 15:55 | Heats |
| Saturday 29 August 2026 | 09:15 | Semifinals |
| Sunday 30 August 2026 | 09.45 | Final B |
| Sunday 30 August 2026 | 10:40 | Final A |

=== Finals ===
Competitors raced for positions 1 to 9, with medals going to the top three.

| Rank | Lane | Name | Nation | Time | Gap |
|---|---|---|---|---|---|
| 1st place, gold medalist(s) | 6 | Serhii Yemelianov | Georgia | 39.82 | |
| 2nd place, silver medalist(s) | 5 | Gabriel Paixao Porto | Brazil | 39.91 | +0.09 |
| 3rd place, bronze medalist(s) | 3 | Miquéias Elias Rodrigues | Brazil | 40.68 | +0.86 |
| 4 | 4 | Dylan Littlehales | Australia | 41.11 | +1.29 |
| 5 | 2 | John Wallace | United States | 41.24 | +1.42 |
| 6 | 8 | Finn Murphy | New Zealand | 41.45 | +1.63 |
| 7 | 7 | Vojtech Prochazka | Czech Republic | 41.60 | +1.78 |
| 8 | 9 | Khasan Kuldashev | Uzbekistan | 42.37 | +2.55 |
| 9 | 1 | Gabin Keirel-Vallet | France | 42.48 | +2.66 |
