= Miquéias Elias Rodrigues =

Brazilian paracanoeist (born 1990)

Personal information
- Born: 26 January 1990 (age 36) Curitiba, Paraná, Brazil

Sport
- Country: Brazil
- Sport: Para canoe
- Disability class: KL3
Medal record
Men's Para canoe
Representing Brazil
Paralympic Games
Bronze medal – third place	2024 Paris	KL3
World Championships
Silver medal – second place	2025 Milan	KL3
Bronze medal – third place	2024 Szeged	KL3
Bronze medal – third place	2026 Poznán	KL3

Miquéias Elias Rodrigues (born 26 January 1990) is a Brazilian Para canoeist. He represented Brazil at the 2024 Summer Paralympics.

== Career ==
Rodrigues represented Brazil at the 2024 Summer Paralympics in the men's KL3 event and won a bronze medal.
