= Serhii Yemelianov =

Ukrainian Para canoeist (born 1993)

Personal information
- Born: 28 May 1993 (age 33) Kremenchuk, Ukraine
- Height: 176 cm (5 ft 9 in)
- Weight: 73 kg (161 lb)

Sport
- Country: Ukraine / Georgia
- Sport: Para canoe
- Disability class: KL3
Medal record
Men's Para canoe
Representing Ukraine
Paralympic Games
Gold medal – first place	2016 Rio de Janeiro	KL3
Gold medal – first place	2020 Tokyo	KL3
Sprint World Championships
Gold medal – first place	2017 Račice	KL3
Gold medal – first place	2018 Montemor-o-Velho	KL3
Gold medal – first place	2019 Szeged	KL3
Gold medal – first place	2021 Copenhagen	KL3
Silver medal – second place	2016 Duisburg	KL3
Sprint European Championships
Gold medal – first place	2017 Plovdiv	KL3
Gold medal – first place	2018 Belgrade	KL3
Gold medal – first place	2019 Poznań	KL3
Gold medal – first place	2021 Poznań	KL3
Representing Georgia
Sprint World Championships
Gold medal – first place	2025 Milan	KL3
Gold medal – first place	2026 Poznán	KL3
Marathon World Championships
Silver medal – second place	2025 Győr	KL3
Sprint European Championships
Gold medal – first place	2025 Račice	KL3
Marathon European Championships
Gold medal – first place	2025 Ponte de Lima	KL3

Serhii Yemelianov (Ukrainian: Сергій Ємельянов, born 28 May 1993 in Kremenchuk) is a Para canoeist for Ukraine until 2021 and for Georgia since 2025. Competing for Ukraine at the Summer Paralympics, he won gold medals in the men's KL3 at the 2016 Paralympics and 2020 Paralympics.
