= Canoe at the Summer Paralympics =

- Events: 8 (men: 4; women: 4)

Games
- 1960; 1964; 1968; 1972; 1976; 1980; 1984; 1988; 1992; 1996; 2000; 2004; 2008; 2012; 2016; 2020; 2024
- Medalists

Canoe debuted at the 2016 Summer Paralympics in Rio de Janeiro. A meeting of the International Paralympic Committee in Guangzhou, China in 2010 decided to add canoe to the roster of the Summer Paralympic Games.

Para canoe is a variant of canoeing for athletes with a variety of physical disabilities. The sport is governed by the International Canoe Federation (ICF).

== Events ==
Competition at the Summer Paralympic Games consists of sprint races over a 200m straight line course. Since 2024, ten different events are held, five for each sex, with each sex eligible for two solo kayak and three Va'a outrigger events.

== Equipment ==
The first canoe programme at the Paralympics in 2016 featured competitors using single kayaks (K1). For the 2020 canoe competitions, a second type of boat, the va'a, was added. This is an outrigger canoe propelled by a single bladed paddle. The canoeists, as in the Olympic Games, share their venue with the rowing regatta.

== Competitor classification ==
There are three different classes for competitors with different physical mobility impairments:

- KL1 - only arms are used for paddling
- KL2 / VL2 - trunk and arms are used for paddling
- KL3 / VL3 - legs, trunk and arms are used for paddling

== Medal table ==
Updated to 2024 Summer Paralympics

In the first three editions of para canoe at the Paralympic games, the medal table has been dominated by Great Britain, and specifically by Great Britain's women, who have won ten from twelve gold medals in women's events, and every gold above the KL1 classification (as well as one of the three in KL1).

The most dominant nation in the mens events has been Australia, down largely to the four gold medals, a Paralympic record, won by Curtis McGrath. Nine nations have won at least one gold medal, and eighteen nations, representing all five Paralympic continents, have won at least one medal.

Rank	Nation	Gold	Silver	Bronze	Total
1	Great Britain (GBR)	10	5	5	20
2	Australia (AUS)	4	3	2	9
3	Ukraine (UKR)	3	4	1	8
4	Brazil (BRA)	2	4	2	8
5	Hungary (HUN)	2	1	1	4
6	Germany (GER)	1	2	4	7
7	Chile (CHI)	1	0	1	2
7	Poland (POL)	1	0	1	2
9	Algeria (ALG)	1	0	0	1
10	France (FRA)	0	2	3	5
11	United States (USA)	0	1	1	2
12	Austria (AUT)	0	1	0	1
12	Canada (CAN)	0	1	0	1
12	RPC (RPC)	0	1	0	1
15	China (CHN)	0	0	1	1
15	Italy (ITA)	0	0	1	1
15	New Zealand (NZL)	0	0	1	1
15	Portugal (POR)	0	0	1	1
Totals (18 entries)		25	25	25	75

== Paralympic medalists ==
=== Men ===
KL1

The KL1 Class is for canoe paddlers who have very limited or no trunk function and no leg function.

Event	Gold	Silver	Bronze
2016	Jakub Tokarz; Poland	Robert Suba; Hungary	Ian Marsden; Great Britain
2020	Péter Pál Kiss; Hungary	Luis Carlos Cardoso da Silva; Brazil	Rémy Boullé; France
2024	Péter Pál Kiss; Hungary	Luis Cardoso da Silva; Brazil	Rémy Boullé; France

KL2

The KL 2 class is for canoe paddlers with partial leg and trunk function alongside good arm strength. A KL2 class paddler should be able to sit upright within the kayak but may require a backrest.

Event	Gold	Silver	Bronze
2016	Curtis McGrath; Australia	Markus Swoboda; Austria	Nick Beighton; Great Britain
2020	Curtis McGrath; Australia	Mykola Syniuk; Ukraine	Federico Mancarella; Italy
2024	Curtis McGrath; Australia	David Phillipson; Great Britain	Mykola Syniuk; Ukraine

KL3

The KL3 class is for canoe paddlers with trunk function and partial leg function.

Event	Gold	Silver	Bronze
2016	Serhii Yemelianov; Ukraine	Tom Kierey; Germany	Caio Ribeiro de Carvalho; Brazil
2020	Serhii Yemelianov; Ukraine	Leonid Krylov; RPC	Robert Oliver; Great Britain
2024	Brahim Guendouz; Algeria	Dylan Littlehales; Australia	Miquéias Elias Rodrigues; Brazil

VL2

The VL2 classification mirrors the KL2 classification but in reference to the Va'a outrigger canoe type. The Va'a outrigger was introduced in 2020.

Event	Gold	Silver	Bronze
2020	Fernando Rufino de Paulo; Brazil	Steven Haxton; United States	Norberto Mourão; Portugal
2024	Fernando Rufino de Paulo; Brazil	Igor Tofalini; Brazil	Steven Haxton; United States

VL3

The VL3 classification mirrors the KL3 classification but in reference to the Va'a outrigger canoe type. Some KL2 paddlers will qualify in this classification as a consequence of the extra stability of the outrigger boat.

Event	Gold	Silver	Bronze
2020	Curtis McGrath; Australia	Giovane Vieira de Paula; Brazil	Stuart Wood; Great Britain
2024	Vladyslav Yepifanov; Ukraine	Jack Eyers; Great Britain	Peter Cowan; New Zealand

=== Women ===
KL1

The KL1 Class is for canoe paddlers who have very limited or no trunk function and no leg function.

Event	Gold	Silver	Bronze
2016	Jeanette Chippington; Great Britain	Edina Muller; Germany	Kamila Kubas; Poland
2020	Edina Müller; Germany	Maryna Mazhula; Ukraine	Katherinne Wollermann; Chile
2024	Katherinne Wollermann; Chile	Maryna Mazhula; Ukraine	Edina Müller; Germany

KL2

The KL 2 class is for canoe paddlers with partial leg and trunk function alongside good arm strength. A KL2 class paddler should be able to sit upright within the kayak but may require a backrest.

Event	Gold	Silver	Bronze
2016	Emma Wiggs; Great Britain	Nataliia Lagutenko; Ukraine	Susan Seipel; Australia
2020	Charlotte Henshaw; Great Britain	Emma Wiggs; Great Britain	Katalin Varga; Hungary
2024	Charlotte Henshaw; Great Britain	Emma Wiggs; Great Britain	Anja Adler; Germany

KL3

The KL3 class is for canoe paddlers with trunk function and partial leg function.

Event	Gold	Silver	Bronze
2016	Anne Dickins; Great Britain	Amanda Reynolds; Australia	Cindy Moreau; France
2020	Laura Sugar; Great Britain	Nélia Barbosa; France	Felicia Laberer; Germany
2024	Laura Sugar; Great Britain	Nélia Barbosa; France	Felicia Laberer; Germany

VL2

The VL2 classification mirrors the KL2 classification but in reference to the Va'a outrigger canoe type. The Va'a outrigger canoe event was introduced in 2020.

Event	Gold	Silver	Bronze
2020	Emma Wiggs; Great Britain	Susan Seipel; Australia	Jeanette Chippington; Great Britain
2024	Emma Wiggs; Great Britain	Brianna Hennessy; Canada	Susan Seipel; Australia

VL3

The VL3 classification mirrors the KL3 classification but in reference to the Va'a outrigger canoe type. Some KL2 paddlers will qualify in this classification as a consequence of the extra stability of the outrigger boat. The women's VL3 was the most recent new canoe event introduced, debuting in 2024.

Event	Gold	Silver	Bronze
2024	Charlotte Henshaw; Great Britain	Hope Gordon; Great Britain	Zhong Yongyuan; China

=== Multiple Medalists ===
The following canoeists have won 3 or more gold medals in para canoe at the Paralympic Games.

Correct as of 1 October 2025:

No.	Athlete	Nation	Games	Gold	Silver	Bronze	Total
1	Curtis McGrath	Australia	2016-2024	4	0	0	4
2	Emma Wiggs	Great Britain	2016-2024	3	2	0	5
3	Charlotte Henshaw	Great Britain	2020-2024	3	0	0	3

Péter Pál Kiss, of Hungary, Laura Sugar of Great Britain, Serhil Yemelianov of Ukraine and Fernando Rufino de Paulo of Brazil, each have two gold medals in canoe. Edina Muller of Germany is the only canoeist, male or female, with a complete set of Paralympic Games canoe medals, gold, silver and bronze, all in the KL1 event.
