= 2023 ICF Canoe Sprint World Championships – Men's KL3 =

Men's KL3 at the 2023 ICF Canoe Sprint World Championships
- Venue: Sportpark Duisburg
- Location: Duisburg, Germany
- Dates: 23–25 August
- Competitors: 28 from 22 nations
- Winning time: 40.050

Medalists
gold medal	Dylan Littlehales	Australia
silver medal	Jonathan Young	Great Britain
bronze medal	Brahim Guendouz	Algeria

The men's KL3 competition at the 2023 ICF Canoe Sprint World Championships in Duisburg took place at Sportpark Duisburg.

== Schedule ==
The schedule was as follows:

Date	Time	Round
Wednesday 23 August 2023	11:20	Heats
Friday 25 August 2023	13:02	Semifinals
Friday 25 August 2023	17:46	Final A
Friday 25 August 2023	18:40	Final B

All times are Central European Summer Time (UTC+2)

== Results ==
=== Heats ===
The fastest six boats in each heat, plus the three fastest seventh-place boats, advanced to the semi-finals.

==== Heat 1 ====
Rank	Name	Country	Time	Notes
1	Juan Valle	Spain	40.898	QS
2	Mateusz Surwiło	Poland	41.241	QS
3	Brahim Guendouz	Algeria	41.371	QS
4	Gabin Keirel	France	43.219	QS
5	Manish Kaurav	India	43.379	QS
6	John Wallace	United States	43.807	QS
7	Hwang Seung-oh	South Korea	45.331	qS

==== Heat 2 ====
Rank	Name	Country	Time	Notes
1	Dylan Littlehales	Australia	40.360	QS
2	Jean Carlos Panucci Benites	Brazil	41.713	QS
3	Khasan Kuldashev	Uzbekistan	41.817	QS
4	Jon Tarrant	Great Britain	42.299	QS
5	Ron Halevi	Israel	42.547	QS
6	Suradech Namtaothong	Thailand	46.542	QS
7	Mariano Turner	Argentina	47.499	qS

==== Heat 3 ====
Rank	Name	Country	Time	Notes
1	Jonathan Young	Great Britain	41.186	QS
2	Giovane Vieira de Paula	Brazil	42.079	QS
3	Erik Kiss	Hungary	42.774	QS
4	Gabriel Ferron-Bouius	Canada	44.011	QS
5	Noureldin Ramadan	Egypt	44.765	QS
6	Choi Yong-beom	South Korea	46.162	QS
7	Nicolás Crosta	Argentina	48.544	qS

==== Heat 4 ====
Rank	Name	Country	Time	Notes
1	Edmond Sanka	Senegal	40.808	QS
2	Kwadzo Klokpah	Italy	41.377	QS
3	Corbin Hart	New Zealand	41.944	QS
4	Zhalgas Taikenov	Kazakhstan	42.596	QS
5	Lu Xiaocong	China	47.104	QS
6	Jithin George	India	49.918	QS
7	Samuel Dagba	Nigeria	51.329	

=== Semifinals ===
The fastest three boats in each semi advanced to the A final.
The next three fastest boats in each semi advanced to the B final.

==== Semifinal 1 ====
Rank	Canoeist	Country	Time	Notes
1	Juan Valle	Spain	40.798	QA
2	Jean Carlos Panucci Benites	Brazil	41.424	QA
3	Corbin Hart	New Zealand	41.981	QA
4	Giovane Vieira de Paula	Brazil	42.193	QB
5	Zhalgas Taikenov	Kazakhstan	42.228	QB
6	Manish Kaurav	India	43.757	QB
7	Noureldin Ramadan	Egypt	45.214	
8	Hwang Seung-oh	South Korea	45.456	
9	Suradech Namtaothong	Thailand	46.953	

==== Semifinal 2 ====
Rank	Canoeist	Country	Time	Notes
1	Dylan Littlehales	Australia	40.122	QA
2	Brahim Guendouz	Algeria	40.534	QA
3	Kwadzo Klokpah	Italy	41.449	QA
4	Gabin Keirel	France	42.714	QB
5	Erik Kiss	Hungary	42.909	QB
6	Gabriel Ferron-Bouius	Canada	43.390	QB
7	Ron Halevi	Israel	43.424	
8	Mariano Turner	Argentina	49.232	
9	Jithin George	India	50.137	

==== Semifinal 3 ====
Rank	Canoeist	Country	Time	Notes
1	Jonathan Young	Great Britain	40.273	QA
2	Mateusz Surwiło	Poland	40.553	QA
3	Khasan Kuldashev	Uzbekistan	41.738	QA
4	Edmond Sanka	Senegal	42.118	QB
5	Jon Tarrant	Great Britain	42.666	QB
6	John Wallace	United States	42.755	QB
7	Choi Yong-beom	South Korea	45.419	
8	Lu Xiaocong	China	46.338	
9	Nicolás Crosta	Argentina	49.206	

=== Finals ===
==== Final B ====
Competitors raced for positions 10 to 18.

Rank	Name	Country	Time
1	Edmond Sanka	Senegal	41.097
2	Gabin Keirel	France	43.093
3	Erik Kiss	Hungary	43.162
4	Giovane Vieira de Paula	Brazil	43.198
5	Jon Tarrant	Great Britain	43.362
6	Zhalgas Taikenov	Kazakhstan	43.869
7	Manish Kaurav	India	43.943
8	Gabriel Ferron-Bouius	Canada	44.167
9	John Wallace	United States	44.535

==== Final A ====
Competitors raced for positions 1 to 9, with medals going to the top three.

Rank	Name	Country	Time
1st place, gold medalist(s)	Dylan Littlehales	Australia	40.050
2nd place, silver medalist(s)	Jonathan Young	Great Britain	40.200
3rd place, bronze medalist(s)	Brahim Guendouz	Algeria	40.492
4	Mateusz Surwiło	Poland	40.498
5	Juan Valle	Spain	40.605
6	Kwadzo Klokpah	Italy	40.888
7	Khasan Kuldashev	Uzbekistan	41.405
8	Jean Carlos Panucci Benites	Brazil	41.551
9	Corbin Hart	New Zealand	42.124
