= Vladyslav Yepifanov =

Ukrainian paracanoeist (born 1999)

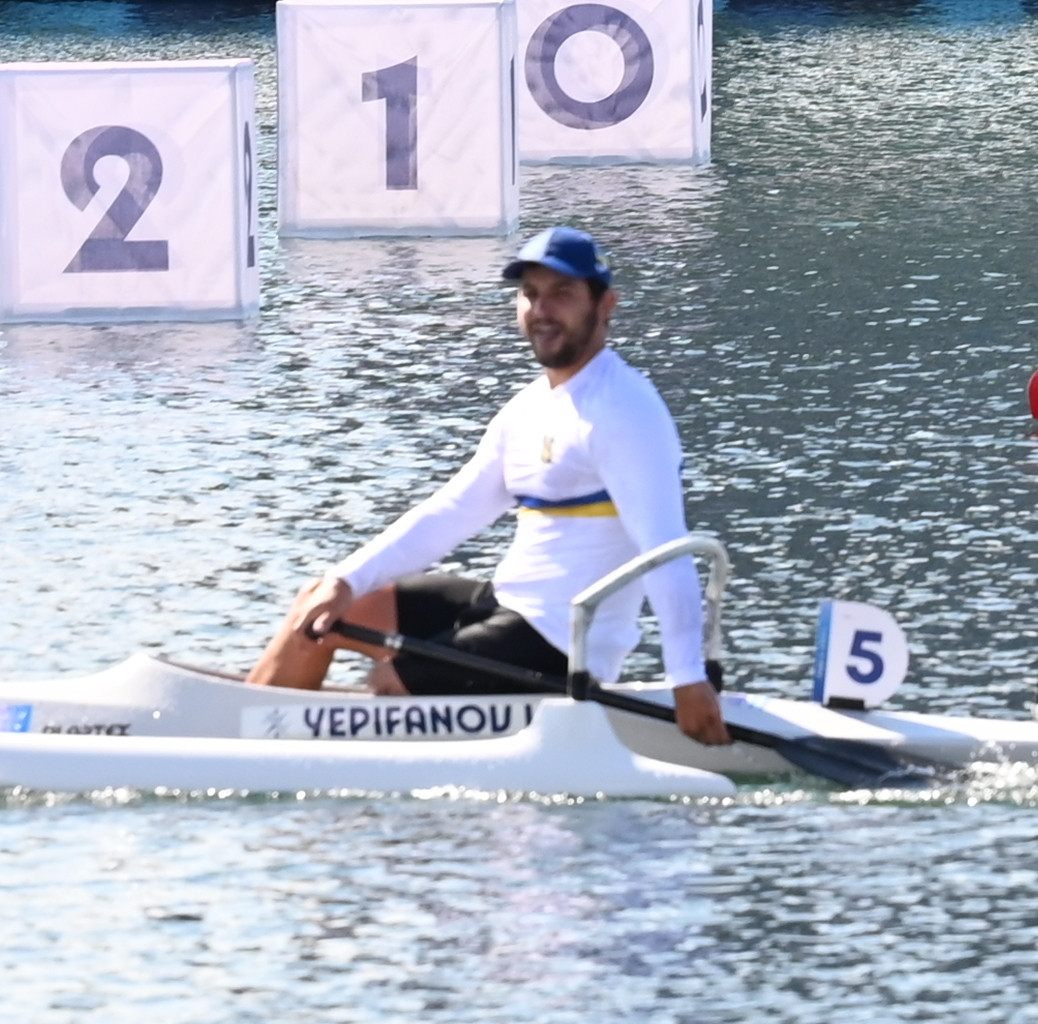
- Yepifanov at the 2024 Summer Paralympics

Personal information
- Born: 8 June 1999 (age 27) Smila, Ukraine

Sport
- Country: Ukraine
- Sport: Para canoe
- Disability class: KL3, VL3
Medal record
Men's Para canoe
Representing Ukraine
Paralympic Games
Gold medal – first place	2024 Paris	VL3
World Championships
Gold medal – first place	2023 Duisburg	VL3
Gold medal – first place	2024 Szeged	VL3
Silver medal – second place	2022 Dartmouth	VL3
Silver medal – second place	2026 Poznań	VL3
Bronze medal – third place	2021 Copenhagen	VL3
European Championships
Gold medal – first place	2023 Montemor-o-Velho	VL3
Gold medal – first place	2024 Szeged	VL3
Gold medal – first place	2025 Racice	VL3
Gold medal – first place	2026 Montemor-o-Velho	VL3
Silver medal – second place	2022 Munich	VL3

Vladyslav Yepifanov (born 8 June 1999) is a Ukrainian Para canoeist. He represented Ukraine at the 2024 Summer Paralympics, winning a gold medal. He has also won four medals at the European Championships and four medals at the European Championships.

== Career ==
Yepifanov represented Ukraine at the 2024 Summer Paralympics in the men's VL3 event and won a gold medal.
