= 2022 ICF Canoe Sprint World Championships – Men's KL3 =

Men's KL3 at the 2022 ICF Canoe Sprint World Championships
- Venue: Lake Banook
- Location: Dartmouth, Canada
- Dates: 3–5 August
- Competitors: 20 from 18 nations
- Winning time: 41.68

Medalists
gold medal	Juan Valle	Spain
silver medal	Robert Oliver	Great Britain
bronze medal	Dylan Littlehales	Australia

The men's KL3 competition at the 2022 ICF Canoe Sprint World Championships in Dartmouth took place on Lake Banook.

== Schedule ==
The schedule was as follows:

Date	Time	Round
Wednesday 3 August 2022	10:55	Heats
Wednesday 3 August 2022	15:10	Semifinals
Friday 5 August 2022	11:15	Final B
Friday 5 August 2022	11:52	Final A

All times are Atlantic Daylight Time (UTC−3)

== Results ==
=== Heats ===
The fastest boat in each heat advanced directly to the A final.
The next six fastest boats in each heat advanced to the semifinals.

==== Heat 1 ====
Rank	Canoeist	Country	Time	Notes
1	Robert Oliver	Great Britain	41.96	QA
2	Erik Kiss	Hungary	44.28	QS
3	Gabriel Ferron-Bouius	Canada	46.66	QF
4	Ron Halevi	Israel	47.49	QS
5	Marcos Domínguez	Argentina	52.16	QS
6	Jorge Obispo	Uruguay	59.45	QS
7	Omar Jimenez	Mexico	1:08.17	QS

==== Heat 2 ====
Rank	Canoeist	Country	Time	Notes
1	Juan Valle	Spain	41.59	QA
2	Jonathan Young	Great Britain	42.06	QS
3	Corbin Hart	New Zealand	43.14	QS
4	John Wallace	United States	46.40	QS
5	Edmond Sanka	Senegal	48.65	QS
6	Eduardo Sánchez	Mexico	2:05.24	QS

==== Heat 3 ====
Rank	Canoeist	Country	Time	Notes
1	Dylan Littlehales	Australia	41.57	QA
2	Mateusz Surwiło	Poland	42.54	QS
3	Khasan Kuldashev	Uzbekistan	43.11	QS
4	Kwadzo Klokpah	Italy	43.18	QS
5	Koichi Imai	Japan	49.85	QS
6	Sunday Olowoniyi	Nigeria	52.84	QS
7	Marcelo González	Chile	53.22	QS

=== Semifinals ===
The fastest three boats in each semi advanced to the A final.
The next four fastest boats in each semi, plus the fastest remaining boat advanced to the B final.

==== Semifinal 1 ====
Rank	Canoeist	Country	Time	Notes
1	Mateusz Surwiło	Poland	42.89	QA
2	Corbin Hart	New Zealand	43.80	QA
3	Kwadzo Klokpah	Italy	44.87	QA
4	John Wallace	United States	46.91	QB
5	Gabriel Ferron-Bouius	Canada	47.20	QB
6	Marcos Domínguez	Argentina	51.78	QB
7	Marcelo González	Chile	54.16	QB
8	Jorge Obispo	Uruguay	55.44	qB
9	Eduardo Sánchez	Mexico	1:56.24	

==== Semifinal 2 ====
Rank	Canoeist	Country	Time	Notes
1	Jonathan Young	Great Britain	42.46	QA
2	Khasan Kuldashev	Uzbekistan	43.78	QA
3	Erik Kiss	Hungary	43.91	QA
4	Ron Halevi	Israel	47.09	QB
5	Edmond Sanka	Senegal	49.09	QB
6	Koichi Imai	Japan	49.57	QB
7	Sunday Olowoniyi	Nigeria	50.61	QB
8	Omar Jimenez	Mexico	1:05.51	

=== Finals ===
==== Final B ====
Competitors in this final raced for positions 10 to 18.

Rank	Name	Country	Time
1	John Wallace	United States	46.51
2	Ron Halevi	Israel	46.68
3	Gabriel Ferron-Bouius	Canada	47.06
4	Marcos Domínguez	Argentina	48.25
5	Edmond Sanka	Senegal	48.71
6	Koichi Imai	Japan	48.90
7	Sunday Olowoniyi	Nigeria	51.55
8	Marcelo González	Chile	53.95
9	Jorge Obispo	Uruguay	54.88

==== Final A ====
Competitors in this final raced for positions 1 to 9, with medals going to the top three.

Rank	Name	Country	Time
1st place, gold medalist(s)	Juan Valle	Spain	41.68
2nd place, silver medalist(s)	Robert Oliver	Great Britain	41.70
3rd place, bronze medalist(s)	Dylan Littlehales	Australia	41.76
4	Jonathan Young	Great Britain	42.43
5	Corbin Hart	New Zealand	42.65
6	Mateusz Surwiło	Poland	42.73
7	Khasan Kuldashev	Uzbekistan	43.44
8	Erik Kiss	Hungary	43.58
9	Kwadzo Klokpah	Italy	43.77
