= Jack Eyers =

British paracanoeist (born 1989)

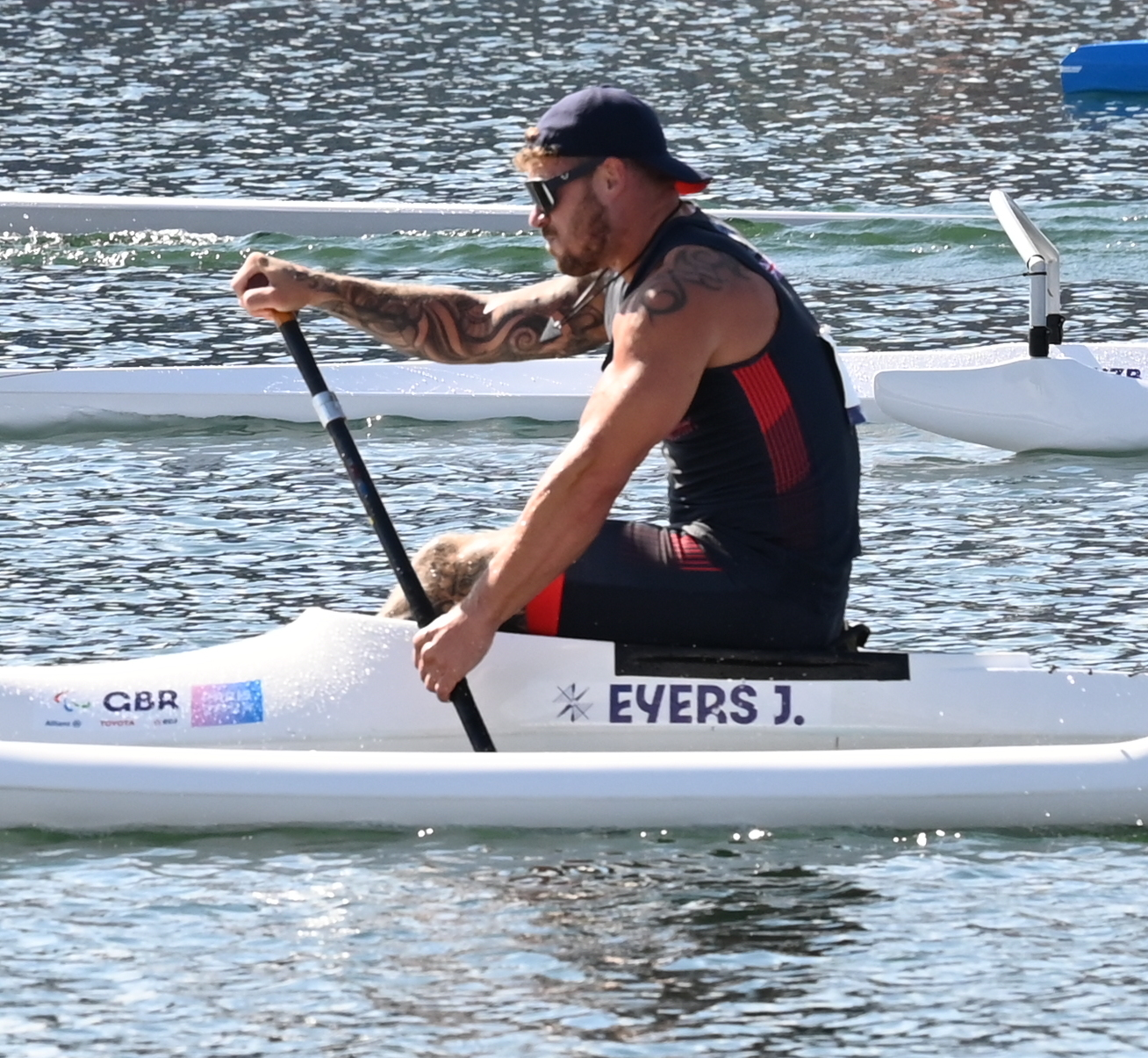
- Eyers at the 2024 Summer Paralympics

Personal information
- Born: 11 April 1989 (age 37) Bournemouth, Great Britain
- Home town: Wells, Somerset, Great Britain

Sport
- Country: Great Britain
- Sport: Para canoe
- Disability: Proximal femoral focal deficiency
- Disability class: VL3
Medal record
Men's Para canoe
Representing Great Britain
Paralympic Games
Silver medal – second place	2024 Paris	VL3
World Championships
Gold medal – first place	2021 Copenhagen	VL3
Gold medal – first place	2022 Dartmouth	VL3
Silver medal – second place	2023 Duisburg	VL3
Bronze medal – third place	2018 Montemor-o-Velho	VL3
European Championships
Gold medal – first place	2022 Munich	VL3
Bronze medal – third place	2018 Belgrade	VL3

Jack Eyers (born 11 April 1989) is a British Para canoeist who competes at international canoe competitions. He is a two-time World champion and a European champion. He is an above-the-knee leg amputee.

== Modelling ==
Eyers was crowned Mr. England in 2017 and was the first amputee to do so. He also began his modelling career with Models of Diversity, an agency that targets to expand body diversity in the fashion industry.
