= István Fábián =

Hungarian canoeist

Medal record

Men's canoe sprint

World Championships
Silver medal – second place	1977 Sofia	K-1 10000 m
Bronze medal – third place	1981 Nottingham	K-1 10000 m

István Fábián is a Hungarian sprint canoeist who competed in the late 1970s and early 1980s. He won two medals in the K-1 10000 m event at the ICF Canoe Sprint World Championships with a silver in 1977 and a bronze in 1981.
