= Stuart Wood (canoeist) =

British Para canoeist (born 1994)

Personal information
- Nationality: British
- Born: 31 January 1994 (age 32)

Sport
- Country: Great Britain
- Sport: Para canoe
- Disability class: VL3
- College team: Bath
- Coached by: Colin Radmore
Medal record
Men's Para canoe
Representing Great Britain
Paralympic Games
Bronze medal – third place	2020 Tokyo	VL3
World Championships
Silver medal – second place	2021 Copenhagen	VL3
Bronze medal – third place	2019 Szeged	VL3
Bronze medal – third place	2026 Poznań	VL3
European Championships
Gold medal – first place	2019 Poznan	VL3
Silver medal – second place	2025 Racice	VL3
Silver medal – second place	2026 Montemor-o-Velho	VL3
Bronze medal – third place	2024 Szeged	VL3

Stuart Wood (born 31 January 1994) is a British Para canoeist. He represented Great Britain at the 2020 Summer Paralympics.

== Early life and education ==
Stuart is a graduate from the University of Bath, where he studied maths, physics and computer science, and he now works in software development in Nottingham. Stuart has been a keen paddler for a number of years and having originally started in the KL3; he has very much found his form in the VL3.

== Career ==
Wood represented Great Britain at the 2019 ICF Canoe Sprint World Championships in the men's VL3 event and won a bronze medal. He was subsequently named to the Paralympic team for Great Britain.

Wood represented Great Britain at the 2020 Summer Paralympics in the men's VL3 event and won a bronze medal.
