= Brahim Guendouz =

Algerian paralympic canoeist

Personal information
- Born: 8 May 1999 (age 27)

Sport
- Country: Algeria
- Sport: Para canoe
- Disability class: KL3
Medal record
Men's Para canoe
Representing Algeria
Paralympic Games
Gold medal – first place	2024 Paris	KL3
World Championships
Bronze medal – third place	2023 Duisburg	KL3

Brahim Guendouz (born 8 May 1999) is an Algerian Para canoeist. He competed at the 2024 Summer Paralympics, winning the gold medal in the men's kayak single 200m event.
