= Leonid Krylov =

Russian Para canoeist (born 1980)

Personal information
- Full name: Leonid Yuryevich Krylov
- Nationality: Russian
- Born: 2 February 1980 (age 46) Moscow, Russia

Sport
- Country: Russia
- Sport: Para canoe
- Disability class: KL3
- Event: Kayak
- Club: Moscow Khlebnikovo Sports School of Olympic Reserve
Medal record
Men's Para canoe
Representing (Russia) RPC
Paralympic Games
Silver medal – second place	2020 Tokyo	KL3
Representing Russia
World Championships
Silver medal – second place	2019 Szeged	KL3
Bronze medal – third place	2014 Moscow	KL3
Bronze medal – third place	2015 Milan	KL3
Bronze medal – third place	2016 Duisburg	KL3
Bronze medal – third place	2018 Montemor-o-Velho	KL3
European Championships
Gold medal – first place	2016 Moscow	KL3
Silver medal – second place	2018 Belgrade	KL3
Silver medal – second place	2019 Poznań	KL3
Silver medal – second place	2021 Poznań	KL3
Bronze medal – third place	2017 Plovdiv	KL3

Leonid Yuryevich Krylov (Russian: Леонид Юрьевич Крылов; born 2 February 1980) is a Russian Para canoeist. He won silver in the Kayak 200 m KL3 event at the 2020 Summer Paralympics in Tokyo.
