= Nader Eivazi =

Iranian canoeist (born 1975)

Nader Eivazi Khiarak (Persian: نادر عیوضی خیارك, born 22 February 1975) is an Iranian sprint canoer who competed in the early 2000s. At the 2000 Summer Olympics in Sydney, he was eliminated in the heats of both the K-1 500 m and the K-1 1000 m events.
