= Peter Cowan (canoeist) =

New Zealand paralympic canoeist

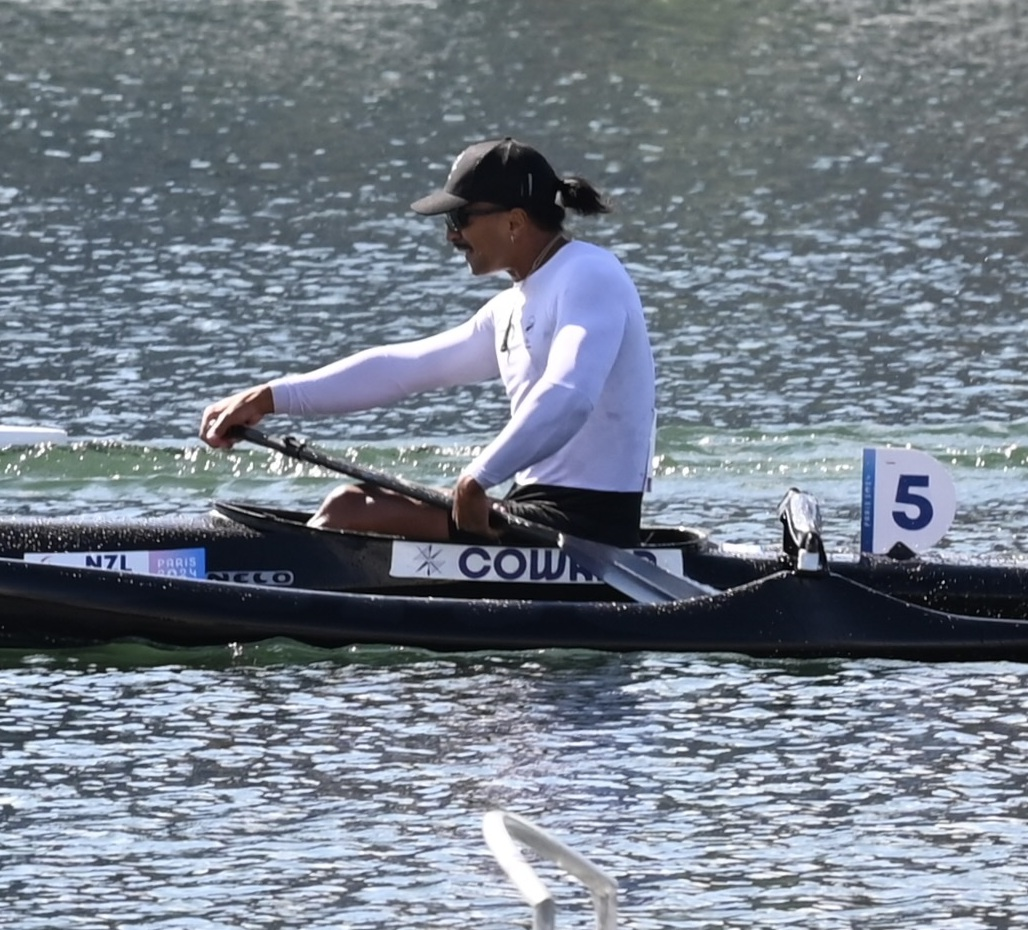
- Cowan at the 2024 Summer Paralympics

Personal information
- Born: 22 June 1995 (age 31)
- Home town: Hastings, New Zealand

Sport
- Country: New Zealand
- Sport: Para canoe
- Disability class: VL3
Medal record
Men's Para canoe
Representing New Zealand
Paralympic Games
Bronze medal – third place	2024 Paris	VL3
World Championships
Silver medal – second place	2024 Szeged	VL3

Peter Cowan (born 22 June 1995) is a New Zealand Para canoeist. He competed at the 2024 Summer Paralympics, winning the bronze medal in the men's va'a single 200m event.
