= Martin Farineaux =

French paracanoeist

Personal information
- Born: 13 August 1981 (age 45)
Medal record
Men's paracanoe
Representing France
World Championships
Silver medal – second place	2010 Poznań	K-1 200 m LTA

Martin Farineaux (born 13 August 1981) is a French paracanoeist who has competed since the late 2000s. He won a silver medal in the K-1 200 m LTA event at the 2010 ICF Canoe Sprint World Championships in Poznań.
