= Dylan Littlehales =

Australian paracanoeist (born 1999)

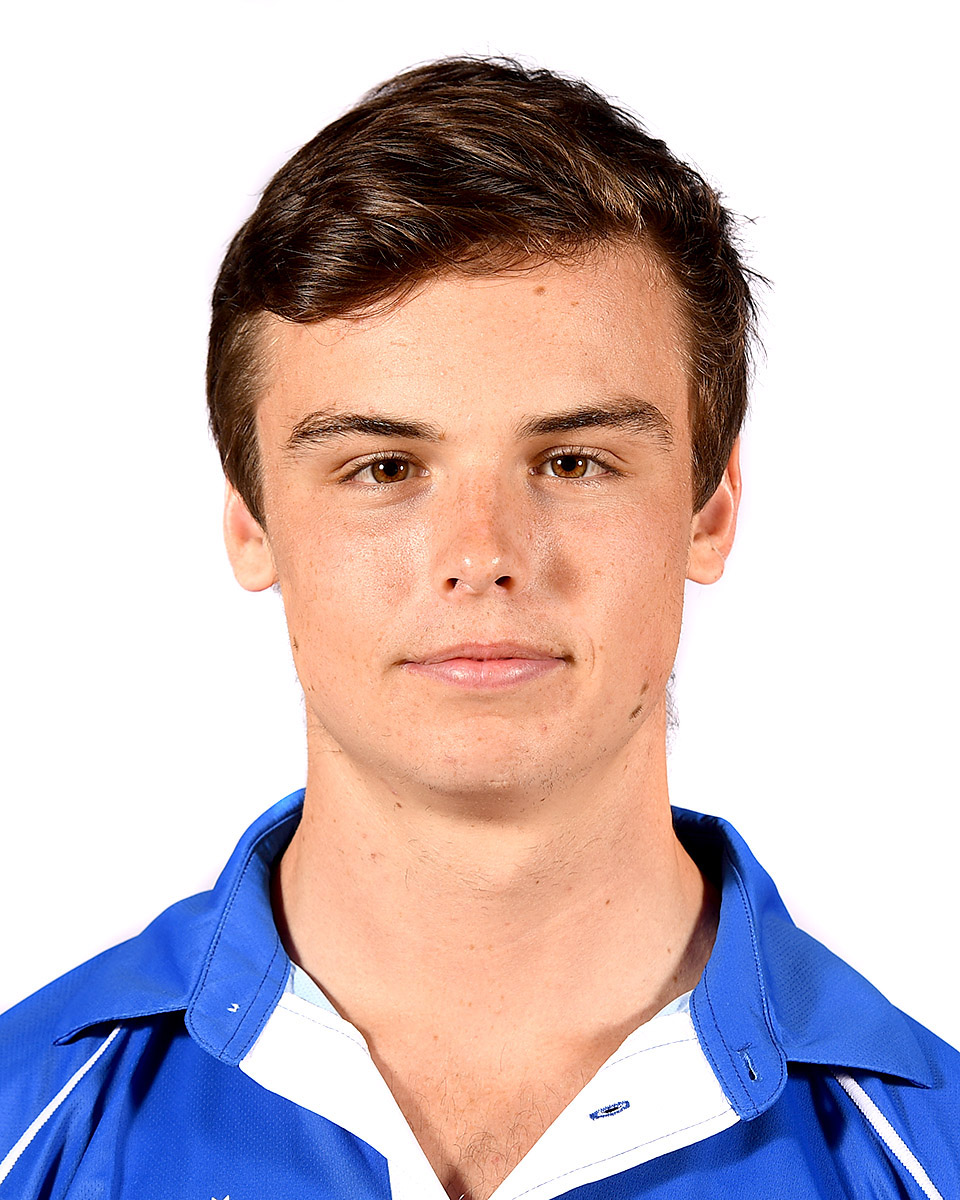
- Photo of Dylan Littlehales from the 2020 Australian Paralympic Team media guide

Personal information
- Nationality: Australia
- Born: 2 November 1999 (age 27)

Sport
- Country: Australia
- Sport: Para canoe
- Disability class: KL3
- Club: Avoca Kayak Club
Medal record
Men's Para canoe
Representing Australia
Paralympic Games
Silver medal – second place	2024 Paris	KL3
World Championships
Gold medal – first place	2023 Duisburg	KL3
Silver medal – second place	2024 Szeged	KL3
Bronze medal – third place	2022 Dartmouth	KL3
Bronze medal – third place	2025 Milan	KL3

Dylan Littlehales (born 2 November 1999) is an Australian Para canoeist. He competed for Australia at the 2016 Rio Paralympics and 2020 Tokyo Paralympics.

== Personal ==
Littlehales was born on 2 November 1999. At birth, his right leg had a deficiency with it missing some crucial ligaments and bones. He has undergone 20 operations to improve the outcome but still has poor mobility and strength in the right leg. He attended Kariong Mountains High School. He completed at Bachelor of Psychologival Science at the University of Newcastle. He is completing honors at Bond University. He lived in Kariong, New South Wales. In 2025 he became engaged to Cassandra Su. They will be married June 14, 2026.

== Canoeing ==
He is classified as KL3 paracanoeist. His uncle Mike Druce, Australian slalom coach, introduced him to paracanoeing at the age of fourteen. He said: "I picked up the sport at the perfect time, because right after I started a new canoe club started about 20 minutes away from me. They had a bunch of boats and paddles, and then I got my own stuff eventually. It is difficult to be able to stay in the boat at first, just to sit fine in it can be a pretty physical thing. After learning that, it is more of a mental thing and building up physical strength."

At the 2015 Australian Championships in Sydney, he finished second in the Men's K1 200 LTA and third in the Men's K1 500 and 1000 LTA events. As a fifteen year old, he competed at the 2015 ICF Canoe Sprint World Championships, Milan. He was the youngest competitor by three years. He finished eight in the Men's KL3 200m B Final.

In 2016, he was the gold medallist at the Australian Championships in Perth, Western Australia and Oceania Championships in the Men's 200 m KL3. At the 2016 ICF Paracanoe World Championships in Duisburg, Germany, he finished second in the Men's 200 m KL3 B Final. This qualified Australia a 2016 Rio Paralympics quota spot. At the Rio Paralympics, at the age of seventeen, he finished sixth in the Men's KL3 semi-final and did not qualify for the final.

In November 2016, he was awarded Australian Canoeing Junior Canoeist of the Year.

At the 2017 ICF Canoe Sprint World Championships, Račice, Czech Republic, he finished fifth in the Men's KL3 200m. At the 2018 ICF Canoe Sprint World Championships, Montemor-o-Velho, Portugal, he again finished fifth in the Men's KL3 200m.

At the 2019 ICF Canoe Sprint World Championships, Szeged, Hungary, he finished fourth in the Men's KL3 200m.

At the 2020 Summer Paralympics, Littlehales finished fourth in the Men's Men's KL3 200m. He came second in his Heat and won his Semi-Final. He could not better his Semi-Final time of 40.234. If he had he would have won the gold medal.

Littlehales won his first international medal by winning the bronze medal in the Men's KL3 200m at the 2022 ICF Canoe Sprint World Championships and followed it up with the gold medal at the 2022 ICF Canoe Sprint World Championships.

He has been selected to compete at the 2024 Summer Paralympics in Paris, France. In the lead up to the Paralympics, Littlehales won a silver medal at the 2024 ICF World Para Canoe Championships in Szeged, Hungary.

He won a bronxe medal in the KL3 at the 2025 ICF Canoe Sprint World Championships in Milan.

Littlehales was coached by Paul Hutchinson, David Birt and Shaun Caven and a member of the Avoca Kayak Club. He models his kayaking technique on two Australian kayakers - Lachlan Tame and Rob McIntyre. In 2025, he is coached by Anna Wood on the Gold Coast.

He also swims for the Gosford Stingrays Swim Club.

== Recognition ==
- 2015 - Central Coast Young Achiever.
- 2017 - Australian Canoeing Junior Canoeist of the Year - Olympic/Paralympic
- 2023 - Paddle Australia Paracanoeist of the Year with Ben Sainsbury
- 2025 - Paddle Australia Paracanoeist of the Year
