= Tom Kierey =

German Para canoeist (born 1994)

Personal information
- Born: 4 September 1994 (age 32) Dresden, Germany
- Height: 183 cm (6 ft 0 in)
- Weight: 100 kg (220 lb)

Sport
- Country: Germany
- Sport: Para canoe
- Disability class: KL3
Medal record
Men's Para canoe
Representing Germany
Paralympic Games
Silver medal – second place	2016 Rio de Janeiro	KL3
World Championships
Gold medal – first place	2013 Duisburg	K-1 LTA
Gold medal – first place	2015 Milan	KL3
Gold medal – first place	2016 Duisburg	KL3

Tom Kierey (born 4 September 1994) is a German Para canoeist. He silver medalled at the 2016 Summer Paralympics in the Men's KL3.
