= Caio Ribeiro de Carvalho =

Brazilian Para canoeist (born 1986)

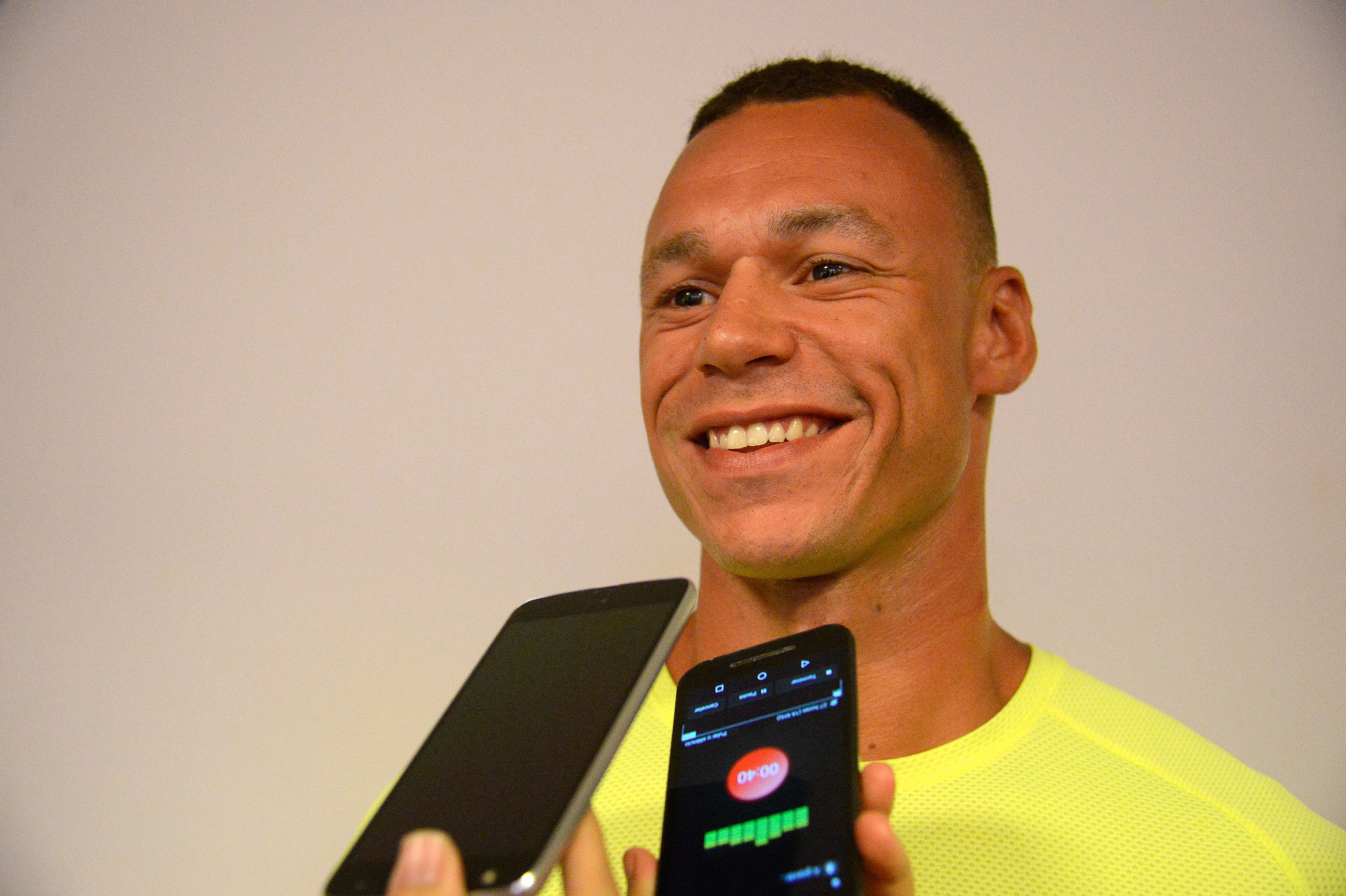
- Ribeiro de Carvalho in 2017

Personal information
- Born: 17 February 1986 (age 40) Rio de Janeiro, Brazil
- Height: 187 cm (6 ft 2 in)
- Weight: 73 kg (161 lb)

Sport
- Country: Brazil
- Sport: Para canoe
- Disability class: KL3
Medal record
Men's Para canoe
Representing Brazil
Paralympic Games
Bronze medal – third place	2016 Rio de Janeiro	KL3
World Championships
Gold medal – first place	2013 Duisburg	V-1 200 m LTA

Caio Ribeiro de Carvalho (born 17 February 1986) is a Brazilian Para canoeist. He competed at the 2016 Summer Paralympics in the paracanoeing competition, winning the bronze medal in the men's KL3 event.
