= Robert Oliver (canoeist) =

British Para canoeist (born 1988)

Personal information
- Born: 14 January 1988 (age 38) Birmingham, England

Sport
- Country: Great Britain
- Sport: Para canoe
- Disability class: KL3
Medal record
Men's Para canoe
Representing Great Britain
Paralympic Games
| Bronze medal – third place | 2020 Tokyo | KL3 |
World Championships
| Silver medal – second place | 2015 Milan | KL3 |
| Silver medal – second place | 2021 Copenhagen | KL3 |
| Silver medal – second place | 2022 Dartmouth | KL3 |

Robert Oliver (born 14 January 1988 in Birmingham) is a British Para canoeist. He won bronze in the Men's Kayak Single 200m - KL3 at the 2020 Summer Paralympics in Tokyo.
