= Giovane Vieira de Paula =

Brazilian Para canoeist (born 1998)

Personal information
- Born: 24 February 1998 (age 28) Apucarana, Brazil

Sport
- Country: Brazil
- Sport: Para canoe
- Disability class: KL3, VL3
Medal record
Men's Para canoe
Representing Brazil
Paralympic Games
Silver medal – second place	2020 Tokyo	VL3
World Championships
Bronze medal – third place	2025 MIlan	VL3

Giovane Vieira de Paula (born 24 February 1998) is a Brazilian Para canoeist. He represented Brazil at the 2020 Summer Paralympics.

== Career ==
Paula represented Brazil at the 2020 Summer Paralympics in the men's VL3 event and won a silver medal.
