= KL3 (classification) =

Disability canoeing classification

The KL3 class is for paracanoe paddlers with trunk function and partial leg function. A KL3 class paddler should be able to sit within a forward flexed position. Paddlers use a foot board or the seat to propel the boat. Eligible paddlers typically meet one of the following:

- Limb loss or deficiency: Amputee or loss of function equivalent to at least a tarsal metatarsal amputation of the foot,
- Loss of muscle strength: In lower limb(s) equivalent to incomplete spinal cord injury at S1 or the loss of ten muscle grade points on one limb or fifteen points across two limbs
- Impaired range of motion: In lower limb(s) e.g. joint fusion.

== Definition ==
This classification is for disability athletes. This classification is one of several classification for athletes with lower limb deficiencies, impaired muscle power and/or impaired passive range of motion. The Australian Paralympic Committee defines this classification for “paddlers with an impairment impacting their lower body, who use leg function, trunk and arm function for paddling.”

In July 2016, the International Paralympic Committee defined this class as, " Athletes in this sports class have trunk and partial leg function, they are able to sit with trunk in forward flexed position in the kayak and able to use at least one leg/prosthesis."

== Performance and technique ==
Unlike KL1 or KL2, KL 3 paddlers apply force using a footboard or the seat to help propel the boat.

== History ==
The classification was created by the International Paralympic Committee (IPC). In 2003, the IPC Athletics Classification Project developed an evidence-based classification system to assist with eligibility and sports class allocation. In April 2015, the International Canoe Federation released a new classification system ahead of the 2016 Rio Paralympics. Changes were made to rename different classes of para-canoeing. Para-canoeing will be included for the first time at the Summer Paralympics in Rio 2016 as voted in by the IPC in 2010.

Formerly Known As	Currently Known As
A (Arms)	KL1
TA (Trunk and Arms)	KL2
LTA (Legs, Trunk and Arms)	KL 3

For the 2016 Summer Paralympics in Rio, the International Paralympic Committee had a zero classification at the Games policy. This policy was put into place in 2014, with the goal of avoiding last minute changes in classes that would negatively impact athlete training preparations. All competitors needed to be internationally classified with their classification status confirmed prior to the Games, with exceptions to this policy being dealt with on a case-by-case basis.

== Becoming classified ==
Becoming classified as a paddler involves the examination of the impairment, pre-competition assessment of sport specific skills and in competition review. Assessment of sport specific skills includes strength and functional movement training, ergometer testing and on-water testing. Paddlers are classified based on loss of muscle strength equivalent to a spinal cord injury complete at T12 level and impaired range of motion. Each paddler receives a status for classification and further allocated a review time.

== Competitors ==
Medallists in the KL3 class at the 2015 ICF Canoe Sprint World Championships included Tom Kierey (Germany), Robert Oliver (Great Britain), Leonid Krylov (Russia), Amanda Reynolds (Australia), Anne Dickins (Great Britain), Cindy Moreau (France).

== See also ==
- Paracanoe
- Paracanoeing at the 2016 Summer Paralympics
