= 2018 ICF Canoe Sprint World Championships – Women's KL2 =

Event at the 2018 ICF Canoe Sprint World Championshipa

Women's KL2 at the 2018 ICF Canoe Sprint World Championships
- Venue: Centro de Alto Rendimento de Montemor-o-Velho
- Location: Montemor-o-Velho, Portugal
- Dates: 22–23 August
- Competitors: 12 from 11 nations
- Winning time: 52.627

Medalists
gold medal	Charlotte Henshaw	Great Britain
silver medal	Emma Wiggs	Great Britain
bronze medal	Nadezda Andreeva	Russia

The women's KL2 competition at the 2018 ICF Canoe Sprint World Championships in Montemor-o-Velho took place at the Centro de Alto Rendimento de Montemor-o-Velho.

== Schedule ==
The schedule was as follows:

Date	Time	Round
Wednesday 22 August 2018	15:45	Heats
Wednesday 22 August 2018	16:55	Semifinal
Thursday 23 August 2018	16:48	Final

All times are Western European Summer Time (UTC+1)

== Results ==
=== Heats ===
The fastest three boats in each heat advanced directly to the final. The next four fastest boats in each heat, plus the fastest remaining boat advanced to the semifinal.

==== Heat 1 ====
Rank	Name	Country	Time	Notes
1	Emma Wiggs	Great Britain	55.480	QF
2	Nataliia Lagutenko	Ukraine	59.935	QF
3	Susan Seipel	Australia	1:02.035	QF
4	Wang Danqin	China	1:03.160	QS
5	Debora Benevides	Brazil	1:05.025	QS
6	Agnès Legroux	France	1:06.525	QS

==== Heat 2 ====
Rank	Name	Country	Time	Notes
1	Charlotte Henshaw	Great Britain	53.820	QF
2	Nadezda Andreeva	Russia	57.691	QF
3	Katalin Varga	Hungary	59.336	QF
4	Anja Adler	Germany	1:03.141	QS
5	Pascale Bercovitch	Israel	1:06.051	QS
6	Kamila Kubas	Poland	1:07.521	QS

=== Semifinal ===
The fastest three boats advanced to the final.

Rank	Name	Country	Time	Notes
1	Wang Danqin	China	58.558	QF
2	Anja Adler	Germany	59.313	QF
3	Debora Benevides	Brazil	1:01.808	QF
4	Pascale Bercovitch	Israel	1:03.573	
5	Kamila Kubas	Poland	1:03.773	
6	Agnès Legroux	France	1:07.129	

=== Final ===
Competitors raced for positions 1 to 9, with medals going to the top three.

Rank	Name	Country	Time
1st place, gold medalist(s)	Charlotte Henshaw	Great Britain	52.627
2nd place, silver medalist(s)	Emma Wiggs	Great Britain	53.402
3rd place, bronze medalist(s)	Nadezda Andreeva	Russia	56.412
4	Katalin Varga	Hungary	57.452
5	Nataliia Lagutenko	Ukraine	57.817
6	Susan Seipel	Australia	59.477
7	Wang Danqin	China	59.647
8	Anja Adler	Germany	1:00.317
9	Debora Benevides	Brazil	1:03.477
