= 2019 ICF Canoe Sprint World Championships – Women's KL2 =

Women's KL2 at the 2019 ICF Canoe Sprint World Championships
- Venue: Olympic Centre of Szeged
- Location: Szeged, Hungary
- Dates: 21–23 August
- Competitors: 17 from 14 nations
- Winning time: 47.62

Medalists
gold medal	Charlotte Henshaw	Great Britain
silver medal	Emma Wiggs	Great Britain
bronze medal	Susan Seipel	Australia

The women's KL2 competition at the 2019 ICF Canoe Sprint World Championships in Szeged took place at the Olympic Centre of Szeged.

== Schedule ==
The schedule was as follows:

Date	Time	Round
Wednesday 21 August 2019	16:40	Heats
Thursday 22 August 2019	11:30	Semifinal
Friday 23 August 2019	11:10	Final

All times are Central European Summer Time (UTC+2)

== Results ==
=== Heats ===
The fastest three boats in each heat advanced directly to the final.
The next four fastest boats in each heat, plus the fastest remaining boat advanced to the semifinal.

==== Heat 1 ====
Rank	Name	Country	Time	Notes
1	Charlotte Henshaw	Great Britain	47.47	QF
2	Nataliia Lagutenko	Ukraine	52.60	QF
3	Wang Danqin	China	53.43	QF
4	Katalin Varga	Hungary	53.63	QS
5	Debora Benevides	Brazil	54.67	QS
6	Andrea Nelson	Canada	56.70	QS
7	Inés Felipe	Spain	58.77	QS
8	Katharina Bauernschmidt	Germany	1:10.61	
9	Channing Cash	United States	1:16.12	

==== Heat 2 ====
Rank	Name	Country	Time	Notes
1	Emma Wiggs	Great Britain	49.98	QF
2	Nadezda Andreeva	Russia	51.69	QF
3	Susan Seipel	Australia	51.70	QF
4	Anja Adler	Germany	54.01	QS
5	Li Yanshu	China	54.97	QS
6	Kamila Kubas	Poland	55.62	QS
7	Pascale Bercovitch	Israel	58.16	QS
8	Kaitlyn Verfuerth	United States	1:08.12	qS

=== Semifinal ===
The fastest three boats advanced to the final.

Rank	Name	Country	Time	Notes
1	Katalin Varga	Hungary	53.61	QF
2	Andrea Nelson	Canada	53.96	QF
3	Anja Adler	Germany	54.07	QF
4	Li Yanshu	China	54.44	
5	Debora Benevides	Brazil	55.85	
6	Kamila Kubas	Poland	55.89	
7	Pascale Bercovitch	Israel	57.41	
8	Inés Felipe	Spain	59.30	
9	Kaitlyn Verfuerth	United States	1:05.70	

=== Final ===
Competitors raced for positions 1 to 9, with medals going to the top three.

Rank	Name	Country	Time
1st place, gold medalist(s)	Charlotte Henshaw	Great Britain	47.62
2nd place, silver medalist(s)	Emma Wiggs	Great Britain	49.03
3rd place, bronze medalist(s)	Susan Seipel	Australia	51.12
4	Nadezda Andreeva	Russia	52.10
5	Andrea Nelson	Canada	53.45
6	Katalin Varga	Hungary	53.53
7	Nataliia Lagutenko	Ukraine	53.75
8	Anja Adler	Germany	54.96
9	Wang Danqin	China	55.46
