= 2024 ICF Paracanoe World Championships – Women's KL2 =

Women's KL2 at the 2024 ICF Paracanoe World Championships
- Venue: Olympic Centre of Szeged
- Location: Szeged, Hungary
- Dates: 9–11 May
- Competitors: 17 from 13 nations
- Winning time: 48.79

Medalists
gold medal	Charlotte Henshaw	Great Britain
silver medal	Katalin Varga	Hungary
bronze medal	Anja Adler	Germany

The women's KL2 competition at the 2024 ICF Paracanoe World Championships in Szeged took place at the Olympic Centre of Szeged.

== Schedule ==
The schedule was as follows:

Date	Time	Round
Thursday 9 May 2024	15:05	Heats
Friday 10 May 2024	8:40	Semifinal
Saturday 11 May 2024	11:10	Final

All times are Central European Summer Time (UTC+2)

== Results ==
=== Heats ===
The fastest three boats in each heat advanced directly to the final.
The next four fastest boats in each heat, plus the fastest remaining boat advanced to the semifinal.

==== Heat 1 ====
Rank	Name	Country	Time	Notes
1	Charlotte Henshaw	Great Britain	48.32	QF
2	Anja Adler	Germany	52.55	QF
3	Inés Felipe	Spain	59.53	QF
4	Rajni Jha	India	1:03.45	QS
5	Shiho Miyajima	Japan	1:03.46	QS
6	Dalma Boldizsar	Hungary	1:04.90	QS
7	Doha Wasfy	Egypt	1:08.79	QS
8	Krystsina Sulzhytskaya	AIN	1:09.76	qS

==== Heat 2 ====
Rank	Name	Country	Time	Notes
1	Katalin Varga	Hungary	50.40	QF
2	Emma Wiggs	Great Britain	51.00	QF
3	Susan Seipel	Australia	54.56	QF
4	Talia Eilat	Israel	55.59	QS
5	Wang Danqin	China	59.95	QS
6	Salwa Ahmed	Egypt	1:04.12	QS
7	Wasana Khuthawisap	Thailand	1:04.57	QS
–	Leonice Friedrich	Brazil	DNF	
–	Prachi Yadav	India	DNS	

=== Semifinal ===
The fastest three boats advanced to the final.

Rank	Name	Country	Time	Notes
1	Talia Eilat	Israel	1:01.60	QF
2	Wang Danqin	China	1:02.74	QF
3	Rajni Jha	India	1:09.25	QF
4	Wasana Khuthawisap	Thailand	1:09.79	
5	Dalma Boldizsar	Hungary	1:10.30	
6	Salwa Ahmed	Egypt	1:12.85	
7	Krystsina Sulzhytskaya	AIN	1:14.68	
8	Shiho Miyajima	Japan	1:15.05	
9	Doha Wasfy	Egypt	1:20.03	

=== Final ===
Competitors raced for positions 1 to 9, with medals going to the top three.

Rank	Name	Country	Time
1st place, gold medalist(s)	Charlotte Henshaw	Great Britain	48.79
2nd place, silver medalist(s)	Katalin Varga	Hungary	50.89
3rd place, bronze medalist(s)	Anja Adler	Germany	52.64
4	Susan Seipel	Australia	55.71
5	Wang Danqin	China	56.17
6	Talia Eilat	Israel	56.80
7	Inés Felipe	Spain	1:00.47
8	Rajni Jha	India	1:04.80
–	Emma Wiggs	Great Britain	DNS
