= 2017 ICF Canoe Sprint World Championships – Women's KL2 =

Women's KL2 at the 2017 ICF Canoe Sprint World Championships
- Venue: Sportcentrum Račice
- Location: Račice, Czech Republic
- Dates: 23–25 August
- Competitors: 10 from 9 nations
- Winning time: 49.947

Medalists
gold medal	Emma Wiggs	Great Britain
silver medal	Nicola Paterson	Great Britain
bronze medal	Nadezda Andreeva	Russia

The women's KL2 competition at the 2017 ICF Canoe Sprint World Championships in Račice took place at the Sportcentrum Račice.

== Schedule ==
The schedule was as follows:

Date	Time	Round
Wednesday 23 August 2017	09:45	Heats
Wednesday 23 August 2017	11:05	Semifinal
Friday 25 August 2017	15:40	Final

All times are Central European Summer Time (UTC+2)

== Results ==
=== Heats ===
The fastest three boats in each heat advanced directly to the final. The next four fastest boats in each heat, plus the fastest remaining boat advanced to the semifinal.

==== Heat 1 ====
Rank	Name	Country	Time	Notes
1	Emma Wiggs	Great Britain	51.297	QF
2	Nadezda Andreeva	Russia	53.691	QF
3	Nataliia Lagutenko	Ukraine	55.730	QF
4	Katalin Varga	Hungary	57.036	QS
5	Agnès Lacheux	France	1:00.819	QS
6	Brenda Sardón	Argentina	1:09.597	QS

==== Heat 2 ====
Rank	Name	Country	Time	Notes
1	Nicola Paterson	Great Britain	52.930	QF
2	Susan Seipel	Australia	54.775	QF
3	Pascale Bercovitch	Israel	59.580	QF
4	Debora Benevides	Brazil	59.742	QS

=== Semifinal ===
The fastest three boats advanced to the final.

Rank	Name	Country	Time	Notes
1	Katalin Varga	Hungary	57.280	QF
2	Debora Benevides	Brazil	59.141	QF
3	Agnès Lacheux	France	59.386	QF
4	Brenda Sardón	Argentina	59.708	

=== Final ===
Competitors raced for positions 1 to 9, with medals going to the top three.

Rank	Name	Country	Time
1st place, gold medalist(s)	Emma Wiggs	Great Britain	49.947
2nd place, silver medalist(s)	Nicola Paterson	Great Britain	51.919
3rd place, bronze medalist(s)	Nadezda Andreeva	Russia	52.514
4	Susan Seipel	Australia	53.525
5	Nataliia Lagutenko	Ukraine	55.203
6	Katalin Varga	Hungary	55.264
7	Pascale Bercovitch	Israel	57.764
8	Debora Benevides	Brazil	58.269
9	Agnès Lacheux	France	59.364
