= 2023 ICF Canoe Sprint World Championships – Women's KL2 =

Women's KL2 at the 2023 ICF Canoe Sprint World Championships
- Venue: Sportpark Duisburg
- Location: Duisburg, Germany
- Dates: 23–26 August
- Competitors: 15 from 11 nations
- Winning time: 48.706

Medalists
gold medal	Charlotte Henshaw	Great Britain
silver medal	Emma Wiggs	Great Britain
bronze medal	Katalin Varga	Hungary

The women's KL2 competition at the 2023 ICF Canoe Sprint World Championships in Duisburg took place at Sportpark Duisburg.

== Schedule ==
The schedule was as follows:

Date	Time	Round
Wednesday 23 August 2023	15:55	Heats
Thursday 24 August 2023	15:30	Semifinal
Saturday 26 August 2023	11:46	Final

All times are Central European Summer Time (UTC+2)

== Results ==
=== Heats ===
The fastest three boats in each heat advanced directly to the final.
The next four fastest boats in each heat, plus the fastest remaining boat advanced to the semifinal.

==== Heat 1 ====
Rank	Name	Country	Time	Notes
1	Charlotte Henshaw	Great Britain	49.063	QF
2	Anja Adler	Germany	53.755	QF
3	Susan Seipel	Australia	54.719	QF
4	Wang Shanshan	China	57.813	QS
5	Salwa Ahmed	Egypt	1:02.824	QS
6	Rajni Jha	India	1:04.553	QS
7	Shiho Miyajima	Japan	1:05.335	QS
8	Wasana Khuthawisap	Thailand	1:08.548	QS

==== Heat 2 ====
Rank	Name	Country	Time	Notes
1	Emma Wiggs	Great Britain	50.604	QF
2	Katalin Varga	Hungary	53.198	QF
3	Talia Eilat	Israel	57.136	QF
4	Wang Danqin	China	57.142	QS
5	Prachi Yadav	India	58.946	QS
6	Johanna Pflügner	Germany	59.237	QS
7	Inés Felipe	Spain	1:02.231	QS

=== Semifinal ===
The fastest three boats advanced to the final.

Rank	Name	Country	Time	Notes
1	Wang Shanshan	China	57.054	QF
2	Johanna Pflügner	Germany	57.717	QF
3	Prachi Yadav	India	58.866	QF
4	Inés Felipe	Spain	59.060	
5	Wang Danqin	China	59.557	
6	Salwa Ahmed	Egypt	1:02.516	
7	Rajni Jha	India	1:04.481	
8	Shiho Miyajima	Japan	1:05.707	
9	Wasana Khuthawisap	Thailand	1:07.177	

=== Final ===
Competitors raced for positions 1 to 9, with medals going to the top three.

Rank	Name	Country	Time
1st place, gold medalist(s)	Charlotte Henshaw	Great Britain	48.706
2nd place, silver medalist(s)	Emma Wiggs	Great Britain	49.690
3rd place, bronze medalist(s)	Katalin Varga	Hungary	50.808
4	Anja Adler	Germany	52.485
5	Susan Seipel	Australia	54.605
6	Talia Eilat	Israel	55.626
7	Prachi Yadav	India	56.665
8	Wang Shanshan	China	57.252
9	Johanna Pflügner	Germany	58.125
