= 2016 ICF Paracanoe World Championships – Women's KL2 =

Women's KL2 at the 2016 ICF Paracanoe World Championships
- Location: Duisburg, Germany
- Dates: 17–19 May
- Competitors: 17 from 12 nations
- Winning time: 53.691

Medalists
| gold medal | Emma Wiggs | Great Britain |
| silver medal | Nicola Paterson | Great Britain |
| bronze medal | Susan Seipel | Australia |

The women's KL2 competition at the 2016 ICF Paracanoe World Championships took place in Duisburg.

== Schedule ==
The schedule was as follows:

| Date | Time | Round |
|---|---|---|
| Tuesday 17 May 2016 | 14:50 | Heats |
| Wednesday 18 May 2016 | 11:15 | Semifinal |
| Thursday 19 May 2016 | 11:10 | Final |

All times are Central European Summer Time (UTC+2)

== Results ==
=== Heats ===
The fastest three boats in each heat advanced directly to the final. The next four fastest boats in each heat, plus the fastest remaining boat advanced to the semifinal.

==== Heat 1 ====
| Rank | Name | Country | Time | Notes |
|---|---|---|---|---|
| 1 | Emma Wiggs | Great Britain | 51.696 | QF |
| 2 | Susan Seipel | Australia | 54.779 | QF |
| 3 | Nadezda Andreeva | Russia | 55.214 | QF |
| 4 | Wang Danqin | China | 55.763 | QS |
| 5 | Alana Nichols | United States | 1:00.506 | QS |
| 6 | Debora Benevides | Brazil | 1:01.718 | QS |
| 7 | Pascale Bercovitch | Israel | 1:02.051 | QS |
| 8 | Shao Shasha | China | 1:12.321 | qS |
| 9 | Monica Taylor | United States | 1:14.504 | |

==== Heat 2 ====
| Rank | Name | Country | Time | Notes |
|---|---|---|---|---|
| 1 | Nicola Paterson | Great Britain | 56.431 | QF |
| 2 | Christine Gauthier | Canada | 57.500 | QF |
| 3 | Nataliia Lagutenko | Ukraine | 57.587 | QF |
| 4 | Rimma Egorkina | Russia | 1:00.163 | QS |
| 5 | Anke Molkenthin | Germany | 1:01.357 | QS |
| 6 | Brenda Sardón | Argentina | 1:05.778 | QS |
| 7 | Wang Chen | China | 1:39.046 | QS |
| – | Katalin Varga | Hungary | SO | |

=== Semifinal ===
The fastest three boats advanced to the final.

| Rank | Name | Country | Time | Notes |
|---|---|---|---|---|
| 1 | Wang Danqin | China | 54.380 | QF |
| 2 | Rimma Egorkina | Russia | 55.631 | QF |
| 3 | Alana Nichols | United States | 56.246 | QF |
| 4 | Debora Benevides | Brazil | 58.091 | |
| 5 | Anke Molkenthin | Germany | 58.189 | |
| 6 | Brenda Sardón | Argentina | 59.904 | |
| 7 | Pascale Bercovitch | Israel | 1:03.857 | |
| 8 | Wang Chen | China | 1:25.159 | |
| – | Shao Shasha | China | SO | |

=== Final ===
Competitors raced for positions 1 to 9, with medals going to the top three.

| Rank | Name | Country | Time |
|---|---|---|---|
| 1st place, gold medalist(s) | Emma Wiggs | Great Britain | 53.691 |
| 2nd place, silver medalist(s) | Nicola Paterson | Great Britain | 56.533 |
| 3rd place, bronze medalist(s) | Susan Seipel | Australia | 57.032 |
| 4 | Nadezda Andreeva | Russia | 57.726 |
| 5 | Christine Gauthier | Canada | 57.751 |
| 6 | Wang Danqin | China | 58.575 |
| 7 | Rimma Egorkina | Russia | 59.281 |
| 8 | Alana Nichols | United States | 1:00.647 |
| 9 | Nataliia Lagutenko | Ukraine | 1:01.256 |
