= 2021 ICF Canoe Sprint World Championships – Women's KL2 =

Women's KL2 at the 2021 ICF Canoe Sprint World Championships
- Venue: Lake Bagsværd
- Location: Copenhagen, Denmark
- Dates: 16–18 September
- Competitors: 10 from 9 nations
- Winning time: 48.73

Medalists
gold medal	Charlotte Henshaw	Great Britain
silver medal	Emma Wiggs	Great Britain
bronze medal	Katalin Varga	Hungary

The women's KL2 competition at the 2021 ICF Canoe Sprint World Championships in Copenhagen took place on Lake Bagsværd.

== Schedule ==
The schedule was as follows:

Date	Time	Round
Thursday 16 September 2021	16:15	Heats
Friday 17 September 2021	10:55	Semifinal
Saturday 18 September 2021	10:26	Final

All times are Central European Summer Time (UTC+2)

== Results ==
=== Heats ===
The fastest three boats in each heat advanced directly to the final. The next four fastest boats in each heat, plus the fastest remaining boat advanced to the semifinal.

==== Heat 1 ====
Rank	Name	Country	Time	Notes
1	Charlotte Henshaw	Great Britain	51.08	QF
2	Katalin Varga	Hungary	55.60	QF
3	Inés Felipe	Spain	1:02.05	QF
4	Shiho Miyajima	Japan	1:15.55	QS
–	Natalia Lagutenko	Ukraine	DSQ	

==== Heat 2 ====
Rank	Name	Country	Time	Notes
1	Emma Wiggs	Great Britain	51.51	QF
2	Nadezda Andreeva	RCF	54.72	QF
3	Anja Adler	Germany	55.11	QF
4	Kamila Kubas	Poland	1:00.26	QS
–	Rajni Jha	India	DNS	

=== Semifinal ===
With only two competitors remaining for three spots, both were advanced to the final.

=== Final ===
Competitors raced for positions 1 to 8, with medals going to the top three.

Rank	Name	Country	Time
1st place, gold medalist(s)	Charlotte Henshaw	Great Britain	48.73
2nd place, silver medalist(s)	Emma Wiggs	Great Britain	50.70
3rd place, bronze medalist(s)	Katalin Varga	Hungary	52.02
4	Anja Adler	Germany	53.25
5	Kamila Kubas	Poland	56.81
6	Nadezda Andreeva	RCF	56.95
7	Inés Felipe	Spain	1:00.67
8	Shiho Miyajima	Japan	1:08.56
