= 2022 ICF Canoe Sprint World Championships – Women's KL2 =

Women's KL2 at the 2022 ICF Canoe Sprint World Championships
- Venue: Lake Banook
- Location: Dartmouth, Canada
- Dates: 4–6 August
- Competitors: 10 from 9 nations
- Winning time: 47.60

Medalists
gold medal	Charlotte Henshaw	Great Britain
silver medal	Emma Wiggs	Great Britain
bronze medal	Katalin Varga	Hungary

The women's KL2 competition at the 2022 ICF Canoe Sprint World Championships in Dartmouth took place on Lake Banook.

== Schedule ==
The schedule was as follows:

Date	Time	Round
Thursday 4 August 2022	10:10	Heats
Thursday 4 August 2022	15:55	Semifinal
Saturday 6 August 2022	10:36	Final

All times are Atlantic Daylight Time (UTC−3)

== Results ==
=== Heats ===
The fastest three boats in each heat advanced directly to the final.
The next four fastest boats in each heat, plus the fastest remaining boat advanced to the semifinal.

==== Heat 1 ====
Rank	Canoeist	Country	Time	Notes
1	Katalin Varga	Hungary	55.09	QF
2	Anja Adler	Germany	56.48	QF
3	Susan Seipel	Australia	58.11	QF
4	Talia Eilat	Israel	1:03.83	QS
5	Inés Felipe	Spain	1:05.59	QS

==== Heat 2 ====
Rank	Canoeist	Country	Time	Notes
1	Charlotte Henshaw	Great Britain	51.52	QF
2	Emma Wiggs	Great Britain	52.25	QF
3	Nataliia Lagutenko	Ukraine	58.01	QF
4	Shiho Miyajima	Japan	1:14.24	QS
5	Salwa Ahmed	Egypt	1:15.88	QS

=== Semifinal ===
The fastest three boats advanced to the final.

Rank	Canoeist	Country	Time	Notes
1	Inés Felipe	Spain	1:05.07	QF
2	Talia Eilat	Israel	1:06.90	QF
3	Shiho Miyajima	Japan	1:16.25	QF
4	Salwa Ahmed	Egypt	1:18.70	

=== Final ===
Competitors raced for positions 1 to 9, with medals going to the top three.

Rank	Name	Country	Time
1st place, gold medalist(s)	Charlotte Henshaw	Great Britain	47.60
2nd place, silver medalist(s)	Emma Wiggs	Great Britain	48.29
3rd place, bronze medalist(s)	Katalin Varga	Hungary	49.97
4	Anja Adler	Germany	51.19
5	Susan Seipel	Australia	52.70
6	Nataliia Lagutenko	Ukraine	53.49
7	Talia Eilat	Israel	56.68
8	Inés Felipe	Spain	58.21
9	Shiho Miyajima	Japan	1:05.80
