= Canoe at the 2020 Summer Paralympics – Women's KL2 =

Women's KL2 at the XVI Paralympic Games
- Venue: Sea Forest Waterway
- Dates: 2–4 September 2021
- Competitors: 13 from 12 nations

Medalists
1st place, gold medalist(s)		Charlotte Henshaw	Great Britain
2nd place, silver medalist(s)		Emma Wiggs	Great Britain
3rd place, bronze medalist(s)		Katalin Varga	Hungary

The Canoe Sprint women's KL2 event at the 2020 Paralympic Games took place on 2 and 4 September 2021. Two initial heats were held. Winners advanced directly to the final. The rest went into one of two semifinals, where the top three in each semifinal also advanced to the final.

== Schedule ==
Date	Time	Round
Thursday, 2 September 2021	11:00	Heats
Saturday, 4 September 2021	09:44	Semifinals
Saturday, 4 September 2021	10:56	Finals

== Results ==
=== Heats ===
Heat 1

Rank	Lane	Name	Nationality	Time	Notes
1	2	Charlotte Henshaw	Great Britain	52.794	FA, PB
2	5	Anja Adler	Germany	55.693	SF
3	3	Andrea Nelson	Canada	58.999	SF
4	6	Susan Seipel	Australia	1:00.077	SF
5	4	Kamila Kubas	Poland	1:01.397	SF
6	1	Wang Danqin	China	1:01.863	SF
7	7	Kaitlyn Verfuerth	United States	1:06.945	SF

Heat 2

Rank	Lane	Name	Nationality	Time	Notes
1	7	Emma Wiggs	Great Britain	53.571	FA
2	5	Katalin Varga	Hungary	55.317	SF
3	4	Natalia Lagutenko	Ukraine	56.834	SF
4	2	Nadezda Andreeva	RPC	57.378	SF
5	6	Pascale Bercovitch	Israel	1:02.291	SF
6	3	Inés Felipe	Spain	1:04.862	SF

=== Semifinals ===
Semifinal 1

Rank	Lane	Name	Nationality	Time	Notes
1	5	Anja Adler	Germany	54.338	FA
2	4	Natalia Lagutenko	Ukraine	54.538	FA
3	6	Susan Seipel	Australia	56.201	FA
4	7	Wang Danqin	China	59.755	FB
5	3	Pascale Bercovitch	Israel	1:00.366	FB

Semifinal 2

Rank	Lane	Name	Nationality	Time	Notes
1	5	Katalin Varga	Hungary	53.658	FA
2	6	Nadezda Andreeva	RPC	54.801	FA
3	4	Andrea Nelson	Canada	55.571	FA
4	3	Kamila Kubas	Poland	58.268	FB
5	7	Inés Felipe	Spain	1:01.351	FB
6	2	Kaitlyn Verfuerth	United States	1:03.543	FB

=== Finals ===
Final B

Rank	Lane	Name	Nationality	Time	Notes
9	5	Kamila Kubas	Poland	57.822	
10	6	Pascale Bercovitch	Israel	58.123	
11	4	Wang Danqin	China	58.218	
12	3	Inés Felipe	Spain	1:02.372	
13	7	Kaitlyn Verfuerth	United States	1:04.459	

Final A

Rank	Lane	Name	Nationality	Time	Notes
1st place, gold medalist(s)	4	Charlotte Henshaw	Great Britain	50.760	PB
2nd place, silver medalist(s)	5	Emma Wiggs	Great Britain	51.409	
3rd place, bronze medalist(s)	6	Katalin Varga	Hungary	52.622	
4	3	Anja Adler	Germany	54.155	
5	7	Natalia Lagutenko	Ukraine	54.340	
6	2	Nadezda Andreeva	RPC	55.524	
7	1	Susan Seipel	Australia	56.522	
8	8	Andrea Nelson	Canada	56.637	
