= 2025 ICF Canoe Sprint World Championships – Women's KL2 =

Women's KL2 200 metres at the 2025 ICF Canoe Sprint World Championships
- Venue: Idroscalo Regatta Course
- Location: Milan, Italy
- Dates: 20–23 August
- Competitors: 15 from 12 nations
- Winning time: 48.07

Medalists
gold medal	Charlotte Henshaw	Great Britain
silver medal	Katalin Varga	Hungary
bronze medal	Anja Adler	Germany

The women's KL2 competition at the 2025 ICF Canoe Sprint World Championships in Milan took place in Idroscalo Regatta Course.

== Schedule ==
The schedule is as follows:

Date	Time	Round
Wednesday 20 August 2025	15:18	Heats
Friday 22 August 2025	09:25	Semifinal
Saturday 23 August 2025	15:18	Final A

== Results ==
=== Heats ===
The fastest three boats in each heat advanced directly to the final.
The next four fastest boats in each heat, plus the fastest remaining boat advanced to the semifinal

==== Heat 1 ====
Rank	Canoeist	Country	Time	Notes
1	Charlotte Henshaw	Great Britain	48.55	FA
2	Leonice Friedrich	Brazil	52.76	FA
3	Prachi Yadav	India	54.35	FA
4	Nadezhda Andreeva	Individual Neutral Athletes	54.47	QS
5	Talia Eilat	Israel	55.72	QS
6	Wang Danqin	China	56.67	QS
7	Carlota Blanca	Spain	57.06	QS
8	Dalma Boldizsar	Hungary	1:01.29	qS

==== Heat 2 ====
Rank	Canoeist	Country	Time	Notes
1	Katalin Varga	Hungary	49.90	FA
2	Anja Adler	Germany	51.54	FA
3	Nataliia Lahutenko	Ukraine	54.80	FA
4	Anna Bilovol	Poland	56.30	QS
5	Ines Felipe Vidigal	Spain	57.85	QS
6	Shiho Miyajima	Japan	59.83	QS
7	Rajni Jha	India	1:07.71	QS

=== Semifinal ===
The fastest three boats iadvanced to the A final.

Rank	Canoeist	Country	Time	Notes
1	Nadezhda Andreeva	Individual Neutral Athletes	55.58	FA
2	Talia Eilat	Israel	57.96	FA
3	Wang Danqin	China	58.89	FA
4	Carlota Blanca	Spain	59.09	
5	Ines Felipe Vidigal	Spain	59.81	
6	Dalma Boldizsar	Hungary	1:04.15	
7	Shiho Miyajima	Japan	1:05.02	
8	Rajni Jha	India	1:09.56	
	Anna Bilovol	Poland	DSQ	

=== Final ===
Competitors raced for positions 1 to 9, with medals going to the top three.

Rank	Canoeist	Country	Time	Notes
1st place, gold medalist(s)	Charlotte Henshaw	Great Britain	48.07	
2nd place, silver medalist(s)	Katalin Varga	Hungary	50.80	
3rd place, bronze medalist(s)	Anja Adler	Germany	51.94	
4	Nadezhda Andreeva	Individual Neutral Athletes	52.42	
5	Leonice Friedrich	Brazil	53.49	
6	Prachi Yadav	India	53.86	
7	Nataliia Lahutenko	Ukraine	55.13	
8	Talia Eilat	Israel	56.69	
9	Wang Danqin	China	58.16	
