= 2019 ICF Canoe Sprint World Championships – Women's VL3 =

Women's VL3 at the 2019 ICF Canoe Sprint World Championships
- Venue: Olympic Centre of Szeged
- Location: Szeged, Hungary
- Dates: 21 August
- Competitors: 7 from 6 nations
- Winning time: 56.82

Medalists
gold medal	Charlotte Henshaw	Great Britain
silver medal	Larisa Volik	Russia
bronze medal	Nataliia Lagutenko	Ukraine

The women's VL3 competition at the 2019 ICF Canoe Sprint World Championships in Szeged took place at the Olympic Centre of Szeged.

== Schedule ==
The schedule was as follows:

Date	Time	Round
Wednesday 21 August 2019	18:17	Final

All times are Central European Summer Time (UTC+2)

== Results ==
With fewer than ten competitors entered, this event was held as a direct final.

Rank	Name	Country	Time
1st place, gold medalist(s)	Charlotte Henshaw	Great Britain	56.82
2nd place, silver medalist(s)	Larisa Volik	Russia	57.84
3rd place, bronze medalist(s)	Nataliia Lagutenko	Ukraine	59.07
4	Anja Adler	Germany	1:04.60
5	Julianna Molnárné Tóth	Hungary	1:13.45
6	Precious Bosede Omoboni	Nigeria	1:14.53
7	Katalin Varga	Hungary	1:15.25
