= 2018 ICF Canoe Sprint World Championships – Women's VL3 =

Canoeing competition

Women's VL3 at the 2018 ICF Canoe Sprint World Championships
- Venue: Centro de Alto Rendimento de Montemor-o-Velho
- Location: Montemor-o-Velho, Portugal
- Dates: 22 August
- Competitors: 8 from 6 nations
- Winning time: 1:06.262

Medalists
gold medal	Larisa Volik	Russia
silver medal	Nataliia Lagutenko	Ukraine
bronze medal	Charlotte Henshaw	Great Britain

The women's VL3 competition at the 2018 ICF Canoe Sprint World Championships in Montemor-o-Velho took place at the Centro de Alto Rendimento de Montemor-o-Velho.

== Schedule ==
The schedule was as follows:

Date	Time	Round
Wednesday 22 August 2018	17:50	Final

All times are Western European Summer Time (UTC+1)

== Results ==
With fewer than ten competitors entered, this event was held as a direct final.

Rank	Name	Country	Time
1st place, gold medalist(s)	Larisa Volik	Russia	1:06.262
2nd place, silver medalist(s)	Nataliia Lagutenko	Ukraine	1:06.397
3rd place, bronze medalist(s)	Charlotte Henshaw	Great Britain	1:06.407
4	Katalin Varga	Hungary	1:14.777
5	Katharina Bauernschmidt	Germany	1:15.032
6	Jillian Elwart	United States	1:15.812
7	Anja Adler	Germany	1:17.402
8	Julianna Molnárné Tóth	Hungary	1:21.632
