= Canoe at the 2016 Summer Paralympics – Women's KL2 =

Women's KL2 at the XV Paralympic Games
- Venue: Lagoa Rodrigo de Freitas
- Dates: 14–15 September 2016
- Competitors: 10 from 10 nations

Medalists
1st place, gold medalist(s)		Emma Wiggs	Great Britain
2nd place, silver medalist(s)		Nataliia Lagutenko	Ukraine
3rd place, bronze medalist(s)		Susan Seipel	Australia

The Canoe Sprint women's KL2 event at the 2016 Paralympic Games took place on 14 and 15 September 2016, at the Lagoa Rodrigo de Freitas. Two heats were held. Winners and runners up advanced directly to the final. The rest went into the semifinal, where the top four advanced to the final.

== Heats ==
=== Heat 1 ===
9:20 14 September 2016:

Rank	Lane	Name	Nationality	Time	Notes
1	6	Emma Wiggs	Great Britain	54.519	F
2	7	Wang Danqin	China	59.987	F
3	8	Pascale Bercovitch	Israel	1:01.713	SF
4	5	Alana Nichols	United States	1:03.861	SF
5	4	Anke Molkenthin	Germany	1:05.721	SF

=== Heat 2 ===
9:25 14 September 2016:

Rank	Lane	Name	Nationality	Time	Notes
1	5	Nataliia Lagutenko	Ukraine	57.145	F
2	6	Susan Seipel	Australia	58.314	F
3	7	Christine Gauthier	Canada	59.077	SF
4	8	Katalin Varga	Hungary	1:00.024	SF
5	4	Debora Raiza Ribeiro Benevides	Brazil	1:03.347	SF

== Semifinal ==
10:29 14 September 2016:

Rank	Lane	Name	Nationality	Time	Notes
1	5	Christine Gauthier	Canada	59.482	F
2	6	Katalin Varga	Hungary	1:00.280	F
3	4	Pascale Bercovitch	Israel	1:02.251	F
4	3	Alana Nichols	United States	1:02.275	F
5	7	Debora Raiza Ribeiro Benevides	Brazil	1:04.697	
6	8	Anke Molkenthin	Germany	1:05.382	

== Final ==
9:16 15 September 2016:

Rank	Lane	Name	Nationality	Time	Notes
1st place, gold medalist(s)	4	Emma Wiggs	Great Britain	53.288	
2nd place, silver medalist(s)	5	Nataliia Lagutenko	Ukraine	55.599	
3rd place, bronze medalist(s)	3	Susan Seipel	Australia	56.796	
4	7	Christine Gauthier	Canada	58.109	
5	2	Katalin Varga	Hungary	59.226	
6	6	Wang Danqin	China	59.587	
7	1	Alana Nichols	United States	1:00.315	
8	8	Pascale Bercovitch	Israel	1:01.131	
