= 2026 ICF Canoe Sprint World Championships – Women's KL2 =

Women's KL2 at the 2026 ICF Canoe Sprint World Championships
- Venue: Lake Malta
- Location: Poznań, Poland
- Dates: 26–29 August
- Winning time: 48.32

Medalists
gold medal	Charlotte Henshaw	Great Britain
silver medal	Katalin Varga	Hungary
bronze medal	Anja Adler	Germany

The women's KL2 competition at the 2026 ICF Canoe Sprint World Championships in Poznań took place at Lake Malta.

== Schedule ==
The schedule is as follows:

Date	Time	Round
Wednesday 26 August 2026	16:39	Heats
Friday 28 August 2026	9:25	Semifinals
Saturday 29 August 2026	15:48	Final

=== Finals ===
Competitors raced for positions 1 to 9, with medals going to the top three.

Rank	Lane	Name	Nation	Time	Gap
1st place, gold medalist(s)	4	Charlotte Henshaw	Great Britain	48.32	
2nd place, silver medalist(s)	8	Katalin Varga	Hungary	51.66	+3.34
3rd place, bronze medalist(s)	3	Anja Adler	Germany	51.67	+3.35
4	7	Emma Wiggs	Great Britain	51.90	+3.58
5	5	Emily Gray	United States	52.02	+3.70
6	6	Leonice Friedrich	Brazil	53.79	+5.47
7	2	Xiao Xiaolin	China	53.88	+5.56
8	1	Carlota Blanca	Spain	54.28	+5.96
9	9	Talia Eilat	Israel	54.66	+6.34
