= 2023 ICF Canoe Sprint World Championships – Women's VL2 =

Women's VL2 at the 2023 ICF Canoe Sprint World Championships
- Venue: Sportpark Duisburg
- Location: Duisburg, Germany
- Dates: 23–25 August
- Competitors: 11 from 11 nations
- Winning time: 57.100

Medalists
gold medal	Emma Wiggs	Great Britain
silver medal	Brianna Hennessy	Canada
bronze medal	Susan Seipel	Australia

The women's VL2 competition at the 2023 ICF Canoe Sprint World Championships in Duisburg took place at Sportpark Duisburg.

== Schedule ==
The schedule was as follows:

Date	Time	Round
Wednesday 23 August 2023	10:45	Heats
Friday 25 August 2023	9:25	Semifinal
Friday 25 August 2023	16:52	Final

All times are Central European Summer Time (UTC+2)

== Results ==
=== Heats ===
The fastest three boats in each heat advanced directly to the final. The next two fastest boats in each heat, plus the fastest remaining boat advanced to the semifinal.

==== Heat 1 ====
Rank	Name	Country	Time	Notes
1	Emma Wiggs	Great Britain	56.002	QF
2	Débora Benevides	Brazil	1:01.099	QF
3	Katharina Bauernschmidt	Germany	1:01.129	QF
4	Irodakhon Rustamova	Uzbekistan	1:03.113	QS
5	Inés Felipe	Spain	1:06.636	QS
6	Saki Komatsu	Japan	1:09.210	QS

==== Heat 2 ====
Rank	Name	Country	Time	Notes
1	Brianna Hennessy	Canada	58.040	QF
2	Susan Seipel	Australia	58.051	QF
3	Prachi Yadav	India	1:01.991	QF
4	Dalma Boldizsar	Hungary	1:08.755	QS
5	Irina Shafir	Israel	1:14.012	QS

=== Semifinal ===
The fastest three boats advanced to the final.

Rank	Name	Country	Time	Notes
1	Irodakhon Rustamova	Uzbekistan	1:04.406	QF
2	Saki Komatsu	Japan	1:09.785	QF
3	Dalma Boldizsar	Hungary	1:10.012	QF
4	Inés Felipe	Spain	1:10.734	
5	Irina Shafir	Israel	1:13.459	

=== Final ===
Competitors raced for positions 1 to 9, with medals going to the top three.

Rank	Name	Country	Time
1st place, gold medalist(s)	Emma Wiggs	Great Britain	57.100
2nd place, silver medalist(s)	Brianna Hennessy	Canada	58.766
3rd place, bronze medalist(s)	Susan Seipel	Australia	59.232
4	Prachi Yadav	India	1:02.190
5	Débora Benevides	Brazil	1:02.366
6	Katharina Bauernschmidt	Germany	1:02.627
7	Irodakhon Rustamova	Uzbekistan	1:04.636
8	Saki Komatsu	Japan	1:10.261
9	Dalma Boldizsar	Hungary	1:10.471
