= 2024 ICF Paracanoe World Championships – Women's VL2 =

Women's VL2 at the 2024 ICF Paracanoe World Championships
- Venue: Olympic Centre of Szeged
- Location: Szeged, Hungary
- Dates: 9–10 May
- Competitors: 15 from 14 nations
- Winning time: 58.69

Medalists
gold medal	Emma Wiggs	Great Britain
silver medal	Brianna Hennessy	Canada
bronze medal	Susan Seipel	Australia

The women's VL2 competition at the 2024 ICF Paracanoe World Championships in Szeged took place at the Olympic Centre of Szeged.

== Schedule ==
The schedule was as follows:

Date	Time	Round
Thursday 9 May 2024	9:20	Heats
Thursday 9 May 2024	11:50	Semifinals
Friday 10 May 2024	11:16	Final A

All times are Central European Summer Time (UTC+2)

== Results ==
=== Heats ===
The fastest three boats in each heat advanced directly to the final.
The next four fastest boats in each heat, plus the fastest remaining boat advanced to the semifinal.

==== Heat 1 ====
Rank	Name	Country	Time	Notes
1	Emma Wiggs	Great Britain	56.35	QF
2	Anastasia Miasnikova	AIN	1:02.10	QF
3	Débora Benevides	Brazil	1:02.29	QF
4	Inés Felipe	Spain	1:08.32	QS
5	Irina Shafir	Israel	1:13.55	QS
6	Salwa Ahmed	Egypt	1:34.10	QS
–	Banjong Maungjan	Thailand	DSQ	
–	Prachi Yadav	India	DNS	

==== Heat 2 ====
Rank	Name	Country	Time	Notes
1	Brianna Hennessy	Canada	57.26	QF
2	Susan Seipel	Australia	59.09	QF
3	Irodakhon Rustamova	Uzbekistan	1:01.05	QF
4	Jeanette Chippington	Great Britain	1:01.19	QS
5	Veronica Biglia	Italy	1:04.03	QS
6	Saki Komatsu	Japan	1:07.49	QS
7	Dalma Boldizsar	Hungary	1:08.86	QS

=== Semifinal ===
The fastest three boats advanced to the final.

Rank	Name	Country	Time	Notes
1	Jeanette Chippington	Great Britain	1:00.17	QF
2	Veronica Biglia	Italy	1:04.71	QF
3	Saki Komatsu	Japan	1:05.62	QF
4	Dalma Boldizsar	Hungary	1:07.42	
5	Inés Felipe	Spain	1:09.51	
6	Irina Shafir	Israel	1:11.48	
7	Salwa Ahmed	Egypt	1:30.39	

=== Final ===
Competitors raced for positions 1 to 9, with medals going to the top three.

Rank	Name	Country	Time
1st place, gold medalist(s)	Emma Wiggs	Great Britain	58.69
2nd place, silver medalist(s)	Brianna Hennessy	Canada	1:00.35
3rd place, bronze medalist(s)	Susan Seipel	Australia	1:02.15
4	Jeanette Chippington	Great Britain	1:02.83
5	Irodakhon Rustamova	Uzbekistan	1:04.60
6	Débora Benevides	Brazil	1:05.71
7	Anastasia Miasnikova	AIN	1:05.81
8	Veronica Biglia	Italy	1:07.73
9	Saki Komatsu	Japan	1:09.15
