= 2022 ICF Canoe Sprint World Championships – Women's VL2 =

Women's VL2 at the 2022 ICF Canoe Sprint World Championships
- Venue: Lake Banook
- Location: Dartmouth, Canada
- Dates: 5 August
- Competitors: 9 from 8 nations
- Winning time: 58.44

Medalists
gold medal	Emma Wiggs	Great Britain
silver medal	Brianna Hennessy	Canada
bronze medal	Jeanette Chippington	Great Britain

The women's VL2 competition at the 2022 ICF Canoe Sprint World Championships in Dartmouth took place on Lake Banook.

== Schedule ==
The schedule was as follows:

Date	Time	Round
Friday 5 August 2022	11:28	Final

All times are Atlantic Daylight Time (UTC−3)

== Results ==
With fewer than ten competitors entered, this event was held as a direct final.

Rank	Name	Country	Time
1st place, gold medalist(s)	Emma Wiggs	Great Britain	58.44
2nd place, silver medalist(s)	Brianna Hennessy	Canada	1:01.42
3rd place, bronze medalist(s)	Jeanette Chippington	Great Britain	1:03.03
4	Katharina Bauernschmidt	Germany	1:04.12
5	Susan Seipel	Australia	1:04.13
6	Débora Benevides	Brazil	1:05.04
7	Prachi Yadav	India	1:11.15
8	Saki Komatsu	Japan	1:12.66
9	Irina Shafir	Israel	1:23.41
