= 2018 ICF Canoe Sprint World Championships – Women's VL2 =

Women's VL2 at the 2018 ICF Canoe Sprint World Championships
- Venue: Centro de Alto Rendimento de Montemor-o-Velho
- Location: Montemor-o-Velho, Portugal
- Dates: 25 August
- Competitors: 7 from 5 nations
- Winning time: 57.766

Medalists
gold medal	Emma Wiggs	Great Britain
silver medal	Jeanette Chippington	Great Britain
bronze medal	Maria Nikiforova	Russia

The women's VL2 competition at the 2018 ICF Canoe Sprint World Championships in Montemor-o-Velho took place at the Centro de Alto Rendimento de Montemor-o-Velho.

== Schedule ==
The schedule was as follows:

Date	Time	Round
Saturday 25 August 2018	10:47	Final

All times are Western European Summer Time (UTC+1)

== Results ==
With fewer than ten competitors entered, this event was held as a direct final.

Rank	Name	Country	Time
1st place, gold medalist(s)	Emma Wiggs	Great Britain	57.766
2nd place, silver medalist(s)	Jeanette Chippington	Great Britain	1:00.491
3rd place, bronze medalist(s)	Maria Nikiforova	Russia	1:00.546
4	Susan Seipel	Australia	1:02.047
5	Debora Benevides	Brazil	1:02.597
6	Veronica Biglia	Italy	1:09.622
7	Anastasia Belogurova	Russia	1:11.157
