= 2021 ICF Canoe Sprint World Championships – Women's VL3 =

Women's VL3 at the 2021 ICF Canoe Sprint World Championships
- Venue: Lake Bagsværd
- Location: Copenhagen, Denmark
- Dates: 16 September
- Competitors: 11 from 9 nations
- Winning time: 59.33

Medalists
| gold medal | Charlotte Henshaw | Great Britain |
| silver medal | Hope Gordon | Great Britain |
| bronze medal | Nataliia Lagutenko | Ukraine |

The women's VL3 competition at the 2021 ICF Canoe Sprint World Championships in Copenhagen took place on Lake Bagsværd.

== Schedule ==
The schedule was as follows:

| Date | Time | Round |
|---|---|---|
| Thursday 16 September 2021 | 09:35 | Heats |
| Thursday 16 September 2021 | 11:50 | Semifinal |
| Thursday 16 September 2021 | 17:50 | Final |

All times are Central European Summer Time (UTC+2)

== Results ==
=== Heats ===
The fastest three boats in each heat advanced directly to the final. The next four fastest boats in each heat, plus the fastest remaining boat advanced to the semifinal.

==== Heat 1 ====
| Rank | Name | Country | Time | Notes |
|---|---|---|---|---|
| 1 | Charlotte Henshaw | Great Britain | 1:00.62 | QF |
| 2 | Erica Scarff | Canada | 1:04.97 | QF |
| 3 | Anja Adler | Germany | 1:06.97 | QF |
| 4 | Katarzyna Kozikowska | Poland | 1:14.59 | QS |
| 5 | Julianna Tóth | Hungary | 1:15.95 | QS |
| – | Sangeeta Rajput | India | DNS | |

==== Heat 2 ====
| Rank | Name | Country | Time | Notes |
|---|---|---|---|---|
| 1 | Hope Gordon | Great Britain | 1:00.06 | QF |
| 2 | Larisa Volik | RCF | 1:01.49 | QF |
| 3 | Nataliia Lagutenko | Ukraine | 1:01.83 | QF |
| 4 | Justyna Regucka | Poland | 1:19.57 | QS |
| 5 | Shiho Miyajima | Japan | 1:30.54 | QS |

=== Semifinal ===
The fastest three boats advanced to the final.

| Rank | Name | Country | Time | Notes |
|---|---|---|---|---|
| 1 | Katarzyna Kozikowska | Poland | 1:13.78 | QF |
| 2 | Julianna Tóth | Hungary | 1:18.69 | QF |
| 3 | Justyna Regucka | Poland | 1:20.50 | QF |
| 4 | Shiho Miyajima | Japan | 1:34.33 | |

=== Final ===
Competitors raced for positions 1 to 9, with medals going to the top three.

| Rank | Name | Country | Time |
|---|---|---|---|
| 1st place, gold medalist(s) | Charlotte Henshaw | Great Britain | 59.33 |
| 2nd place, silver medalist(s) | Hope Gordon | Great Britain | 1:00.69 |
| 3rd place, bronze medalist(s) | Nataliia Lagutenko | Ukraine | 1:02.09 |
| 4 | Larisa Volik | RCF | 1:02.15 |
| 5 | Erica Scarff | Canada | 1:04.65 |
| 6 | Anja Adler | Germany | 1:07.64 |
| 7 | Julianna Tóth | Hungary | 1:15.78 |
| 8 | Katarzyna Kozikowska | Poland | 1:16.88 |
| 9 | Justyna Regucka | Poland | 1:17.10 |
