= 2021 ICF Canoe Sprint World Championships – Women's VL2 =

Women's VL2 at the 2021 ICF Canoe Sprint World Championships
- Venue: Lake Bagsværd
- Location: Copenhagen, Denmark
- Dates: 17 September
- Competitors: 6 from 6 nations
- Winning time: 57.55

Medalists
gold medal	Emma Wiggs	Great Britain
silver medal	Maria Nikiforova	International Paralympic Committee
bronze medal	Débora Benevides	Brazil

The women's VL2 competition at the 2021 ICF Canoe Sprint World Championships in Copenhagen took place on Lake Bagsværd.

== Schedule ==
The schedule was as follows:

Date	Time	Round
Friday 17 September 2021	15:41	Final

All times are Central European Summer Time (UTC+2)

== Results ==
With fewer than ten competitors entered, this event was held as a direct final.

Rank	Name	Country	Time
1st place, gold medalist(s)	Emma Wiggs	Great Britain	57.55
2nd place, silver medalist(s)	Maria Nikiforova	RCF	1:05.11
3rd place, bronze medalist(s)	Débora Benevides	Brazil	1:06.30
4	Katharina Bauernschmidt	Germany	1:06.47
–	Prachi Yadav	India	DNS
–	Veronica Biglia	Italy	DNS
