= 2019 Paracanoe European Championships =

International canoeing and kayaking event

- Location: Poznań, Poland
- Start date: 21 May
- End date: 22 May

The 2019 Paracanoe European Championships was held in Poznań, Poland, from 21 to 22 May 2019. This event, which is usually part of the Canoe Sprint European Championships, was held separately as the ECA chose not to organise said event because of the European Games.

== Explanation of events ==
Paracanoe competitions are contested in either a va'a (V), an outrigger canoe (which includes a second pontoon) with a single-blade paddle, or in a kayak (K), a closed canoe with a double-bladed paddle. All international competitions are held over 200 metres in single-man boats, with three event classes in both types of vessel for men and women depending on the level of an athlete's impairment. The lower the classification number, the more severe the impairment is - for example, VL1 is a va'a competition for those with particularly severe impairments.

== Medal summary ==
=== Medal table ===
Rank	Nation	Gold	Silver	Bronze	Total
1	Ukraine (UKR)	4	1	0	5
2	Russia (RUS)	2	1	0	3
3	Great Britain (GBR)	1	2	4	7
4	Poland (POL)	1	1	0	2
5	Hungary (HUN)	1	0	1	2
6	Italy (ITA)	0	2	1	3
7	France (FRA)	0	1	1	2
8	Austria (AUT)	0	1	0	1
9	Germany (GER)	0	0	1	1
9	Portugal (POR)	0	0	1	1
Totals (10 entries)		9	9	9	27

=== Medal events ===
Non-Paralympic classes

Event	Gold		Silver		Bronze	
Men's KL1	Péter Pál Kiss; Hungary	51.797	Esteban Farias; Italy	51.833	Ian Marsden; Great Britain	52.493
Men's KL2	Mykola Syniuk; Ukraine	44.779	Markus Swoboda; Austria	45.063	Federico Mancarella; Italy	45.511
Men's KL3	Serhii Yemelianov; Ukraine	41.133	Leonid Krylov; Russia	42.169	Robert Oliver; Great Britain	42.477
Men's VL1 (Note: Not included in the medal table due to lack of participation)	Artur Chuprov; Russia	1:02.996	Mykola Fedorenko; Ukraine	1:12.652	not awarded as only 2 boats competed	
Men's VL2	Igor Korobeynikov; Russia	54.340	Jakub Tokarz; Poland	55.760	Norberto Mourão; Portugal	55.920
Men's VL3	Vladyslav Yepifanov; Ukraine	49.665	Stuart Wood; Great Britain	50.401	Eddie Potdevin; France	50.785
Women's KL1	Maryna Mazhula; Ukraine	55.092	Eleonora de Paolis; Italy	55.772	Jeanette Chippington; Great Britain	56.556
Women's KL2	Charlotte Henshaw; Great Britain	49.022	Emma Wiggs; Great Britain	51.242	Katalin Varga; Hungary	54.826
Women's KL3	Katarzyna Sobczak; Poland	51.171	Nélia Barbosa; France	51.307	Laura Sugar; Great Britain	52.495
Women's VL1	Esther Bode; Germany	1:57.592	not awarded as only 1 boat competed			
Women's VL2	Emma Wiggs; Great Britain	1:09.072	Jeanette Chippington; Great Britain	1:10.296	Maria Nikiforova; Russia	1:10.672
Women's VL3	Larisa Volik; Russia	1:06.211	Nataliia Lagutenko; Ukraine	1:09.663	Anja Adler; Germany	1:13.103
