= 2017 ICF Canoe Sprint World Championships – Women's VL2 =

Women's VL2 at the 2017 ICF Canoe Sprint World Championships
- Venue: Sportcentrum Račice
- Location: Račice, Czech Republic
- Dates: 24 August
- Competitors: 8 from 7 nations
- Winning time: 1:02.897

Medalists
| gold medal | Susan Seipel | Australia |
| silver medal | Mariia Nikiforova | Russia |
| bronze medal | Nataliia Lagutenko | Ukraine |

The women's VL2 competition at the 2017 ICF Canoe Sprint World Championships in Račice took place at the Sportcentrum Račice.

== Schedule ==
The schedule was as follows:

| Date | Time | Round |
|---|---|---|
| Thursday 24 August 2017 | 12:49 | Final |

All times are Central European Summer Time (UTC+2)

== Results ==
With fewer than ten competitors entered, this event was held as a direct final.

| Rank | Name | Country | Time |
|---|---|---|---|
| 1st place, gold medalist(s) | Susan Seipel | Australia | 1:02.897 |
| 2nd place, silver medalist(s) | Mariia Nikiforova | Russia | 1:03.680 |
| 3rd place, bronze medalist(s) | Nataliia Lagutenko | Ukraine | 1:03.808 |
| 4 | Debora Benevides | Brazil | 1:06.080 |
| 5 | Nadezda Andreeva | Russia | 1:08.547 |
| 6 | Brenda Sardón | Argentina | 1:09.097 |
| 7 | Julianna Molnárné Tóth | Hungary | 1:13.430 |
| 8 | Charlotte Henshaw | Great Britain | 1:16.158 |
