= 2016 ICF Paracanoe World Championships – Women's VL2 =

Women's VL2 at the 2016 ICF Paracanoe World Championships
- Location: Duisburg, Germany
- Dates: 19 May
- Competitors: 8 from 7 nations
- Winning time: 1:02.960

Medalists
gold medal	Susan Seipel	Australia
silver medal	Debora Benevides	Brazil
bronze medal	Nadezda Andreeva	Russia

The women's VL2 competition at the 2016 ICF Paracanoe World Championships took place in Duisburg.

== Schedule ==
The schedule was as follows:

Date	Time	Round
Thursday 19 May 2016	14:45	Final

All times are Central European Summer Time (UTC+2)

== Results ==
With fewer than ten competitors entered, this event was held as a direct final.

Rank	Name	Country	Time
1st place, gold medalist(s)	Susan Seipel	Australia	1:02.960
2nd place, silver medalist(s)	Debora Benevides	Brazil	1:03.519
3rd place, bronze medalist(s)	Nadezda Andreeva	Russia	1:05.909
4	Mariia Nikiforova	Russia	1:06.906
5	Elizabeth Tench	Great Britain	1:07.083
6	Brenda Sardón	Argentina	1:10.875
7	Veronica Biglia	Italy	1:14.498
8	Julianna Molnárné Tóth	Hungary	1:15.497
