= 2026 ICF Canoe Sprint World Championships – Women's VL2 =

Women's VL2 at the 2026 ICF Canoe Sprint World Championships
- Venue: Lake Malta
- Location: Poznań, Poland
- Dates: 27–30 August
- Winning time: 58.76

Medalists
gold medal	Emma Wiggs	Great Britain
silver medal	Brianna Hennessy	Canada
bronze medal	Anastasia Miasnikova	Individual Neutral Athletes

The women's VL2 competition at the 2026 ICF Canoe Sprint World Championships in Poznań took place at Lake Malta.

== Schedule ==
The schedule is as follows:

Date	Time	Round
Thursday 27 August 2026	15:10	Heats
Friday 28 August 2026	11:12	Semifinals
Sunday 30 August 2026	10:22	Final

=== Finals ===
Competitors raced for positions 1 to 9, with medals going to the top three..

Rank	Lane	Name	Nation	Time	Gap
1st place, gold medalist(s)	4	Emma Wiggs	Great Britain	58.76	
2nd place, silver medalist(s)	5	Brianna Hennessy	Canada	1:00.82	+2.06
3rd place, bronze medalist(s)	6	Anastasia Miasnikova	Individual Neutral Athletes-B	1:02.31	+3.55
4	3	Débora Benevides	Brazil	1:04.30	+5.54
5	7	Carlota Blanca	Spain	1:05.00	+6.24
6	9	Chinette Karina Lauridsen	Germany	1:07.02	+8.26
7	2	Ines Felipe Vidigal	Spain	1:07.83	+9.07
8	1	Susanna Wills	Australia	1:07.85	+9.09
9	8	Xian Xiaoyue	China	1:08.40	+9.64
