= Canoe at the 2020 Summer Paralympics – Women's VL2 =

Women's VL2 at the XVI Paralympic Games
- Venue: Sea Forest Waterway
- Dates: 2–3 September 2021
- Competitors: 11 from 10 nations

Medalists
1st place, gold medalist(s)		Emma Wiggs	Great Britain
2nd place, silver medalist(s)		Susan Seipel	Australia
3rd place, bronze medalist(s)		Jeanette Chippington	Great Britain

The Canoe Sprint women's VL2 event at the 2020 Paralympic Games took place on 2 and 3 September 2021. Two initial heats were held. Winners advanced directly to the final. The rest went into one of two semifinals, where the top three in each semifinal also advanced to the final.

== Schedule ==
Date	Time	Round
Thursday, 2 September 2021	09:40	Heats
Friday, 3 September 2021	09:44	Semifinals
Friday, 3 September 2021	11:02	Final A

== Results ==
=== Heats ===
Heat 1

Rank	Lane	Name	Nationality	Time	Notes
1	7	Emma Wiggs	Great Britain	58.084	FA, PB
2	5	Maria Nikiforova	RPC	1:04.250	SF
3	4	Brianna Hennessy	Canada	1:05.608	SF
4	2	Prachi Yadav	India	1:11.098	SF
5	3	Saki Komatsu	Japan	1:14.310	SF
6	6	Veronica Biglia	Italy	1:15.671	SF

Heat 2

Rank	Lane	Name	Nationality	Time	Notes
1	2	Susan Seipel	Australia	1:02.840	FA
2	3	Jeanette Chippington	Great Britain	1:03.854	SF
3	4	Katharina Bauernschmidt	Germany	1:05.324	SF
4	5	Debora Benevides	Brazil	1:05.923	SF
5	6	Kaitlyn Verfuerth	United States	1:09.417	SF

=== Semifinals ===
Semifinal 1

Rank	Lane	Name	Nationality	Time	Notes
1	4	Maria Nikiforova	RPC	1:01.085	FA
2	5	Katharina Bauernschmidt	Germany	1:02.601	FA
3	3	Debora Benevides	Brazil	1:03.230	FA
4	6	Saki Komatsu	Japan	1.08.477	

Semifinal 2

Rank	Lane	Name	Nationality	Time	Notes
1	4	Jeanette Chippington	Great Britain	1:01.167	FA
2	5	Brianna Hennessy	Canada	1:06.316	FA
3	3	Prachi Yadav	India	1:07.397	FA
4	6	Kaitlyn Verfuerth	United States	1:08.401	
5	2	Veronica Biglia	Italy	1:09.247	

=== Final A ===
Rank	Lane	Name	Nationality	Time	Notes
1st place, gold medalist(s)	5	Emma Wiggs	Great Britain	57.028	PB
2nd place, silver medalist(s)	4	Susan Seipel	Australia	1:01.481	
3rd place, bronze medalist(s)	3	Jeanette Chippington	Great Britain	1:02.149	
4	6	Maria Nikiforova	RPC	1:02.554	
5	7	Brianna Hennessy	Canada	1:03.254	
6	2	Katharina Bauernschmidt	Germany	1:04.023	
7	8	Debora Benevides	Brazil	1:04.778	
8	1	Prachi Yadav	India	1:07.329	
