= 2017 ICF Canoe Sprint World Championships – Women's VL3 =

Women's VL3 at the 2017 ICF Canoe Sprint World Championships
- Venue: Sportcentrum Račice
- Location: Račice, Czech Republic
- Dates: 23 August
- Competitors: 5 from 5 nations
- Winning time: 59.341

Medalists
| gold medal | Larisa Volik | Russia |
| silver medal | Anja Adler | Germany |
| bronze medal | Lindsay Thorpe | Great Britain |

The women's VL3 competition at the 2017 ICF Canoe Sprint World Championships in Račice took place at the Sportcentrum Račice.

== Schedule ==
The schedule was as follows:

| Date | Time | Round |
|---|---|---|
| Wednesday 23 August 2017 | 15:20 | Final |

All times are Central European Summer Time (UTC+2)

== Results ==
With fewer than ten competitors entered, this event was held as a direct final.

| Rank | Name | Country | Time |
|---|---|---|---|
| 1st place, gold medalist(s) | Larisa Volik | Russia | 59.341 |
| 2nd place, silver medalist(s) | Anja Adler | Germany | 1:08.241 |
| 3rd place, bronze medalist(s) | Lindsay Thorpe | Great Britain | 1:08.347 |
| 4 | Elena Naveiro | Spain | 1:10.836 |
| 5 | Katarzyna Sobczak | Poland | 1:43.280 |
