= Charlotte Henshaw =

British Para swimmer and Para canoeist (born 1987)

Charlotte Henshaw MBE
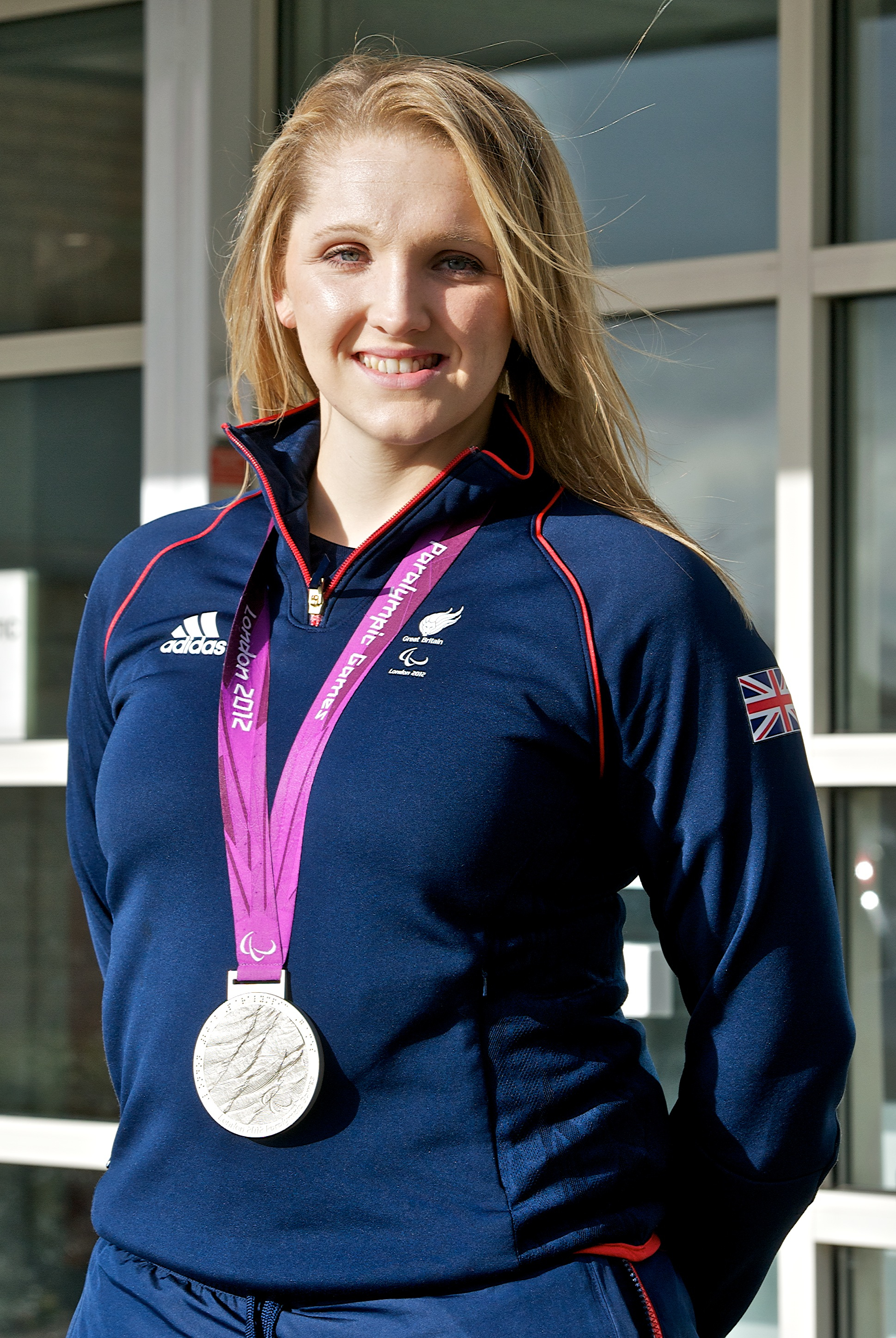
- Henshaw in 2013 when opening a prosthetics and orthotics centre at the University of Salford

Personal information
- Full name: Charlotte Sarah Henshaw
- Nationality: British
- Born: 16 January 1987 (age 39) Mansfield, Nottinghamshire, England

Sport
- Country: Great Britain
- Sport: Para swimming Para canoe
- Disability class: KL2 (Para canoe)
Medal record
Representing Great Britain
Women's Para swimming
Paralympic Games
Silver medal – second place	2012 London	100 m breaststroke SB6
Bronze medal – third place	2016 Rio de Janeiro	100 m breaststroke SB6
World Championships
Silver medal – second place	2010 Eindhoven	100 m breaststroke SB6
Silver medal – second place	2015 Glasgow	100 m breaststroke SB6
Bronze medal – third place	2013 Montreal	100 m breaststroke SB6
European Championships
Gold medal – first place	2009 Reykjavik	100 m breaststroke SB6
Gold medal – first place	2016 Funchal	100 m breaststroke SB6
Silver medal – second place	2011 Berlin	100 m breaststroke SB6
Bronze medal – third place	2009 Reykjavik	200 m individual medley SM8
Women's Para canoe
Paralympic Games
Gold medal – first place	2020 Tokyo	KL2
Gold medal – first place	2024 Paris	KL2
Gold medal – first place	2024 Paris	VL3
World Championships
Gold medal – first place	2018 Montemor-o-Velho	KL2
Gold medal – first place	2019 Szeged	KL2
Gold medal – first place	2019 Szeged	VL3
Gold medal – first place	2021 Copenhagen	KL2
Gold medal – first place	2021 Copenhagen	VL3
Gold medal – first place	2022 Dartmouth	KL2
Gold medal – first place	2022 Dartmouth	VL3
Gold medal – first place	2023 Duisburg	KL2
Gold medal – first place	2024 Szeged	KL2
Gold medal – first place	2024 Szeged	VL3
Gold medal – first place	2025 Milan	KL2
Gold medal – first place	2026 Poznán	KL2
Silver medal – second place	2025 Milan	VL3
Bronze medal – third place	2018 Montemor-o-Velho	VL3
European Championships
Gold medal – first place	2019 Poznań	KL2
Gold medal – first place	2022 Munich	VL3
Gold medal – first place	2025 Racice	KL2
Gold medal – first place	2026 Montemor-o-Velho	KL2
Gold medal – first place	2026 Montemor-o-Velho	VL3
Silver medal – second place	2017 Plovdiv	KL2
Silver medal – second place	2018 Belgrade	KL2
Silver medal – second place	2022 Munich	KL2
Silver medal – second place	2025 Racice	VL3

Charlotte Sarah Henshaw (born 16 January 1987) is a British Paralympic full-time athlete across multiple disciplines. Originally a Para swimmer, she changed to Para canoe in 2017, becoming the reigning World champion in the KL2 (eight-time) and VL3 (four-time) 200m events. In September 2021, at the delayed 2020 Summer Paralympics in Tokyo, she became a Paralympic champion at her fourth games, winning the Women's KL2 event. In Paris at the 2024 Summer Paralympics, Henshaw was the only Paracanoe athlete to win double gold - winning the inaugural VL3 event and retaining her KL2 title.

Henshaw was recruited to the British Para canoe team in June 2021, specialising in KL2 Kayak, and VL3 Va'a events.

Previously a swimmer specialising in 100 metres breaststroke SB6, Henshaw was a European champion and Paralympic medalist from the early 2010s. During her swimming career, she competed in SB6, SM8 and S8 category events, representing Great Britain in the 2010, 2013 & 2015 IPC World Championships and the 2008 Beijing Paralympics, 2012 Summer Paralympics and the 2016 Paralympics in Rio de Janeiro. Henshaw won a silver medal at the London games, followed by a bronze in Rio de Janeiro.

== Swimming career history ==
Henshaw was born in Mansfield, England in 1987. She was born with bilateral tibial hypoplasia - her lower legs were under-developed, which resulted in her legs being amputated above the knee when she was 15 months old. She began swimming at the age of four, and progressed through Nottinghamshire swimming development system before joining the Nova Centurion swimming club at the age of 12. She first represented Great Britain at the age of 16 when she swam at the Danish Open.

In 2005 she moved to Scotland to study Psychology and Sports Studies at the University of Stirling. While at Stirling she combined her studies with training, and was selected to represent Great Britain at the 2008 Summer Paralympics in Beijing. At Beijing she competed in just one event, the SB6 100m breaststroke, and posted a time of 1:45.28 to come in fourth.

Henshaw's next major tournament was the 2009 IPC European Championship. She entered the S8 400m freestyle, the SM8 200m individual medley and the SB6 100m breaststroke, taking the gold medal in the breaststroke in a time of 1:40.50. She also won bronze in the S8 200 Individual Medley. Henshaw went on to take gold at the 2009 British Championships in the 100m breaststroke. The next year she was part of the Great Britain team at the IPC World Championships in Eindhoven, Netherlands, and in the heats of the 100m breaststroke she recorded the fastest time, breaking the World Record in the process. In the finals, despite finishing in 1:39.74, she finished in second place to take the silver.

In 2011, Henshaw represented Great Britain at the IPC European Championships in Berlin, Germany. She finished 5th in the S8 400m freestyle, 4th in the SM8 200m individual medley and won the silver in the SB6 100m breaststroke. Henshaw was back in the British team in 2012 when she was selected for her second Paralympics, this time on home-soil in London. She entered two events, the 400m Freestyle (S8) and the 100m Breaststroke (SB6). In her first event, the 400m freestyle, she failed to make it through the heats, finishing 12th. On the morning of the 5 September, Henshaw set a new Paralympic record with a time of 1:39.64 in the qualifying heat of the 100m breaststroke. The final, held in the afternoon session, saw Henshaw in a close race with Viktoriia Savtsova of Ukraine, and although both athletes broke Henshaw's new record, Savtsova took gold by 0.03 seconds.

2013 saw Henshaw take to the water at the 2013 IPC World Championships in Montreal, Canada where she took bronze in the final. The following year, Henshaw missed the IPC European Championships due to being hospitalised for a severe leg infection. She would have to take 2 months out of the pool in order to fully recover. In June 2015, Henshaw returned to the competitive circuit and broke her own European Record at the Scottish National meet (1.37.56) and later that summer she returned to the international stage at the IPC World Championships in Glasgow, where she broke her European record twice in one day, clinching a silver medal in the final in a time of 1.36.94.

2016 was to be Henshaw's final year of competitive swimming. She won European Gold in Madeira, Portugal in May 2016 and was selected for her 3rd Paralympic Games in Rio de Janeiro. Henshaw went on to win bronze, behind Tiffany Thomas-Kane (AUS) & Sophia Herzog (USA)

== Paracanoe career ==
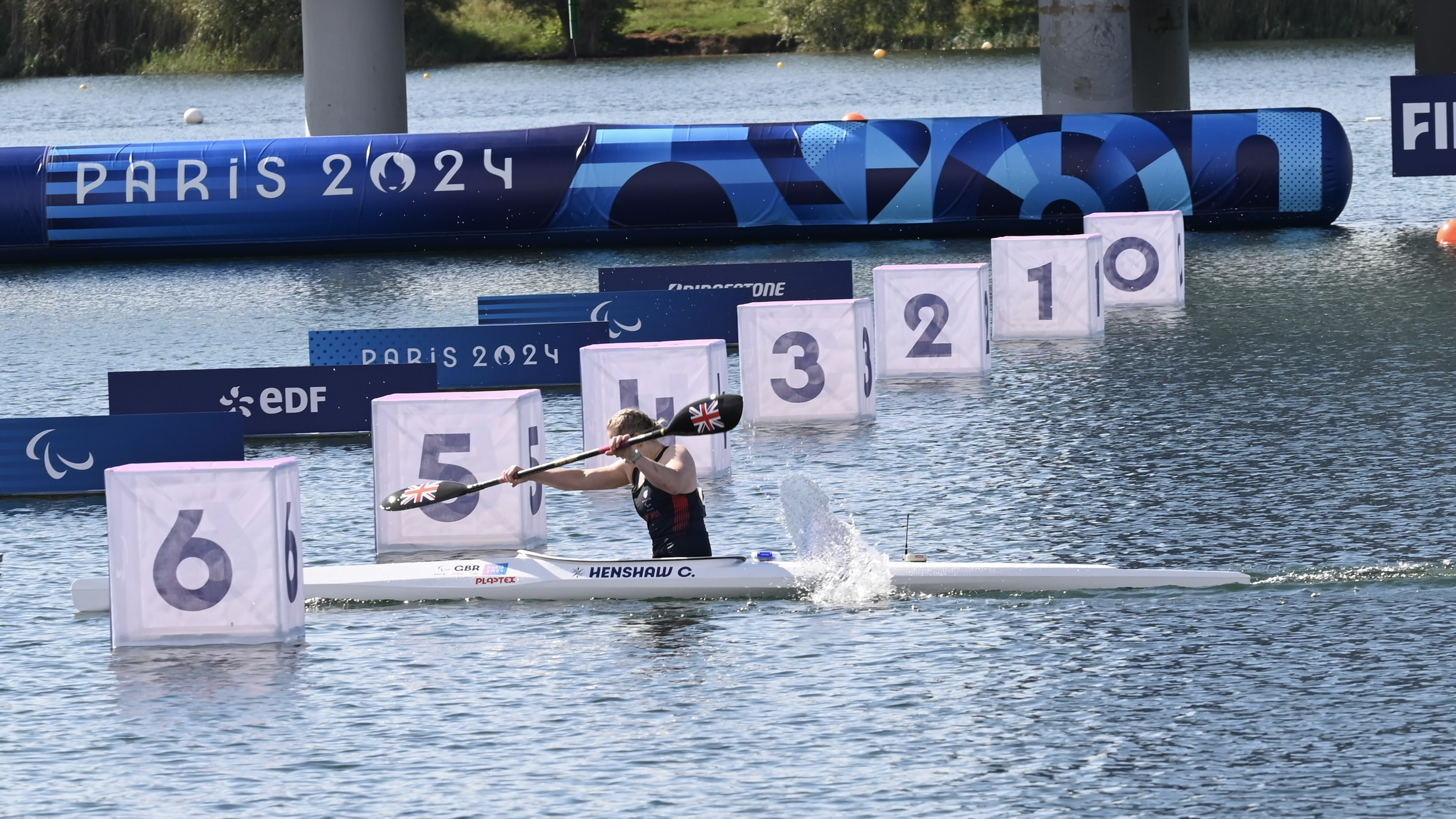
Henshaw at the 2024 Summer Paralympics.

In early 2017, Henshaw announced her retirement from swimming to become a competitive paracanoeist. Starting canoe training in late 2016, she made her international debut at the European Champions in Bulgaria - winning a silver medal - and went on to compete at the World championships in the Czech Republic during 2017.

The 2018 season saw Henshaw add both World Cup & European Silver during May and June. Henshaw competed at her 2nd Paracanoe World Championships in Montemor-O-Velho in August 2018. She won bronze in the VL3 200m and became World Champion in the KL2 200m - her first international Paracanoe title.

2019 would become Henshaw's breakthrough year in Paracanoe. She was internationally undefeated in the KL2 200m event for the entire racing season, winning gold medals at the European Championships, ICF World Cup and ICF World Championships. She also won World gold in the VL3 200m events at the World Championships. Henshaw also posted World leading times in both the KL2 and VL3 200m events at the ICF World Championships in Szeged, Hungary in August 2019.

In June 2021, Henshaw was named as part of the team to represent the UK at the postponed 2020 Paralympics in Tokyo. A full-time athlete, she benefits from National Lottery funding, administered by UK Sport.

At the Tokyo Games, Henshaw claimed Gold in the KL2 200m in a Paralympic Best time of 50.760. Three weeks later, at the ICF World Championships in Copenhagen, Henshaw claimed the KL2 200m title for the 3rd World Championships in a row & added a second consecutive VL3 World title.

The 2022 season saw Henshaw claim the “triple double” - the 3rd World Championships in a row she won KL2 and VL3 world championship titles at the ICF World Championships in Halifax, Canada. One week later in Munich at the Munich European Championships Henshaw claimed her maiden VL3 200m title in a European best time & a silver medal in the KL2 200m.

== Recognition ==
Originally suggested by Henshaw's father, Mansfield District ward councillor Paul Henshaw, to acknowledge the achievements of Ollie Hynd, the council voted in December 2014 to name the 25-metre laned pool at the town's Water Meadows complex as Hynds and Henshaw Competition Pool, to honour Ollie, his brother Sam and Charlotte Henshaw who all trained there.

In 2016, Henshaw, Ollie Hynd and their swimming coach were all awarded the Freedom of Mansfield.

Henshaw was appointed Member of the Order of the British Empire (MBE) in the 2022 New Year Honours for services to canoeing.

== Personal life ==
Henshaw was born at King's Mill Hospital and spent her childhood in Mansfield, attending St Patrick's Primary School and All Saints Secondary schools. She uses prosthetic legs made by Iceland-based company Össur.
