= Emma Wiggs =

British Para canoeist and sitting volleyball player (born 1980)

Emma Wiggs MBE
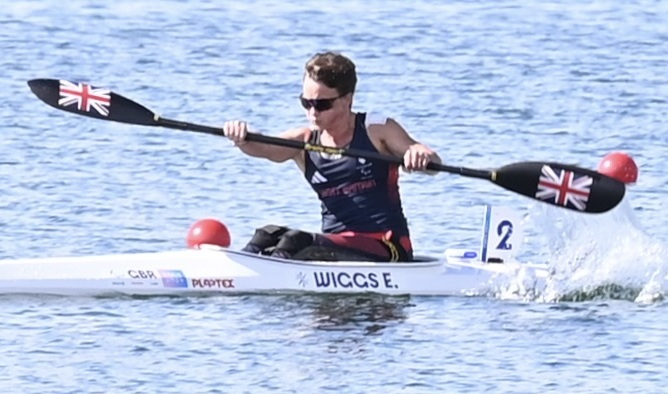
- Wiggs at the 2024 Summer Paralympics

Personal information
- Nationality: British
- Born: Emma Clare Wiggs; 14 June 1980 (age 46) Harrow, London, England
- Height: 1.57 m (5 ft 2 in)
- Weight: 55 kg (121 lb)

Sport
- Country: Great Britain
- Sport: Sitting volleyball (2010–12); Para canoe (2013–present)
- Disability: Paralysis due to nerve injury
- Disability class: KL2 (Para canoe)
Medal record
Women's Para canoe
Representing Great Britain
Event	1st	2nd	3rd
Paralympic Games	3	2	0
World Championships	13	5	0
European Championships	7	3	0
Total	23	10	0
Paralympic Games
Gold medal – first place	2016 Rio de Janeiro	KL2
Gold medal – first place	2020 Tokyo	VL2
Gold medal – first place	2024 Paris	VL2
Silver medal – second place	2020 Tokyo	KL2
Silver medal – second place	2024 Paris	KL2
World Championships
Gold medal – first place	2013 Duisburg	K-1 TA
Gold medal – first place	2014 Moscow	K-1 TA
Gold medal – first place	2014 Moscow	V-1 TA
Gold medal – first place	2015 Milan	KL2
Gold medal – first place	2016 Duisburg	KL2
Gold medal – first place	2017 Račice	KL2
Gold medal – first place	2018 Montemor-o-Velho	VL2
Gold medal – first place	2019 Szeged	VL2
Gold medal – first place	2021 Copenhagen	VL2
Gold medal – first place	2022 Dartmouth	VL2
Gold medal – first place	2023 Duisburg	VL2
Gold medal – first place	2024 Szeged	VL2
Gold medal – first place	2026 Poznań	VL2
Silver medal – second place	2018 Montemor-o-Velho	KL2
Silver medal – second place	2019 Szeged	KL2
Silver medal – second place	2021 Copenhagen	KL2
Silver medal – second place	2022 Dartmouth	KL2
Silver medal – second place	2023 Duisburg	KL2
European Championships
Gold medal – first place	2017 Plovdiv	KL2
Gold medal – first place	2018 Belgrade	KL2
Gold medal – first place	2019 Poznań	VL2
Gold medal – first place	2018 Belgrade	VL2
Gold medal – first place	2022 Munich	KL2
Gold medal – first place	2022 Munich	VL2
Gold medal – first place	2026 Montemor-o-Velho	VL2
Silver medal – second place	2019 Poznań	KL2
Silver medal – second place	2015 Račice	KL2
Silver medal – second place	2026 Montemor-o-Velho	KL2

Emma Clare Wiggs (born 14 June 1980) is a British Para canoeist and former sitting volleyball player, who competes in the KL2 classification of paracanoe. She won gold at the 2016 Summer Paralympics in the KL2 category, gold and silver at the 2020 Summer Paralympics in VL2 and KL2 categories, and is also an eleven-time world champion. As a volleyball player she was part of the Great Britain team that competed at the 2012 Summer Paralympics.

== Background ==
Wiggs was born in Harrow, London and grew up in Watford. She attended Watford Grammar School for Girls. At the age of 18 she contracted an unidentified virus during a gap year in Australia which caused paralysis in her arms and legs. Her arms later recovered, but she had permanent nerve damage in her legs.

Wiggs graduated from the University of Chichester with a degree in sports and exercise sciences in 2003, and went on to qualify as a teacher by gaining the Postgraduate Certificate in Education in 2004. She worked as a physical education teacher at Lavant House (the school is now closed) in Chichester and The Regis School in Bognor Regis before becoming a full-time athlete.

== Career ==
Wiggs took up sitting volleyball in 2010 after attending a UK Sport talent identification day, where she was offered the opportunity to train in five different sports but chose sitting volleyball because she wanted to compete in a team sport. She captained the Great Britain team which won the bronze medal at the 2010 World Championships in the second division, coming 11th overall. and was a member of the team that competed at the 2012 Summer Paralympics, finishing eighth. At club level she played for Portsmouth Sharks.

Wiggs switched to paracanoeing after the 2012 Paralympics. She became a full-time athlete, training at the Holme Pierrepont National Watersports Centre in Nottingham, and won European and World Championship titles in the K1 200m TA class in 2013. In 2014, she successfully defended both titles, and also won gold at the World Championships and silver at the European Championships in the V1W 200m TA class. She won further world titles in the K1 200m KL2 class in 2015 and 2016, (Note: The International Canoe Federation reclassified the TA category as the KL2 category from 2015 onwards.) and also won the silver medal at the 2015 European Championships.

Wiggs won gold in the KL2 class at the 2016 Summer Paralympics, the first Paralympics to feature canoeing events, with a time of 53.288 seconds.

At the 2020 Paralympics she became the most successful Female Paracanoest, winning a further Gold in the VL2 and Silver in the KL2. She then continued her success with Gold and Silver at the Paracanoe Worlds in the VL2 and KL2.

At the 2024 Summer Paralympics, she won a gold in women's paracanoeing va'a VL2 and a silver in women's paracanoeing kayak KL2.

== Career outside Sport ==
Wiggs is a motivational speaker, ambassador and mentor. She has been chosen as one of 35 elite female athletes for the ‘Unlocked’ initiative, set up by Women’s Sports Trust, with the aim of challenging the lack of diversity in sport, particularly at a senior level; she is a performance champion at Vitality, and she is also working in partnership with Caravan and Motorhome Club supporting disabled access.

Wiggs was awarded an Honorary Doctorate of Education by the University of Chichester in 2017.

Wiggs is openly lesbian.
