= Rajni Jha =

Indian paraconoe athlete

Rajni Jha is an Indian para athlete from Madhya Pradesh who competes in canoeing. She qualified for the 2024 Summer Paralympics in the canoeing women's KL2 event, earning India a quota place but her name was missing in the final list. India also qualified through the 2023 ICF Canoe Sprint World Championships in Duisburg, Germany; and 2024 ICF Canoe Sprint World Championships in Szeged, Hungary.

== Early life ==
Jha is from Gwalior, Madhya Pradesh. She is born with polio. She began at the MP Water Sports Academy run by the sports department of Madhya Pradesh. Senior national coach Mayank Thakur spotted her and introduced her to canoeing. She now trains under coach Pijush Kanti Baroi at the State Kayaking Canoeing Academy. She works in the RTO office at Bhopal.

== Career ==
Jha represented India at the 2022 Asian Para Games at Hangzhou, China. She qualified after earning a third place at the Para Canoe World Championships at Hungary in May 2024.
