= Kamila Kubas =

Polish Para canoeist (born 1983)

Personal information
- Born: 13 May 1983 (age 43) Malomice, Poland
- Home town: Zielona Góra, Poland

Sport
- Country: Poland
- Sport: Para canoe
- Disability: Paraplegia
- Disability class: KL1
- Club: START Zielona Góra
- Coached by: Renata Kletkotko; Jan Durczak
Medal record
Women's Para canoe
Representing Poland
Paralympic Games
Bronze medal – third place	2016 Rio de Janeiro	KL1

Kamila Kubas (born 13 May 1983) is a Polish Para canoeist. She was a bronze medalist at the 2016 Summer Paralympics in paracanoe.
