= Nataliia Lagutenko =

Ukrainian Para canoeist

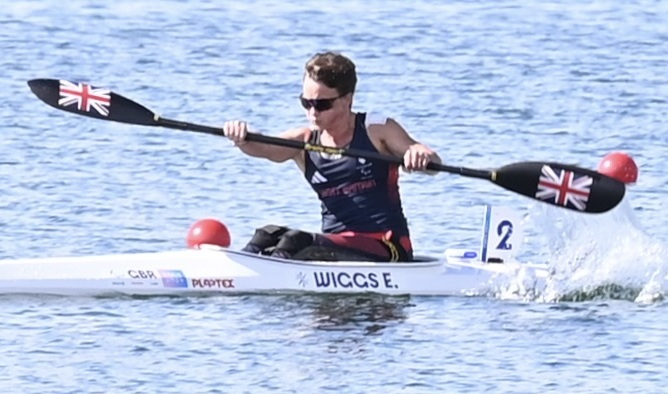

Personal information
- Born: 14 November 1985 (age 40)

Sport
- Country: Ukraine
- Sport: Para canoe
- Disability class: KL2, VL2, VL3
Medal record
Women's Para canoe
Representing Ukraine
Paralympic Games
Silver medal – second place	2016 Rio de Janeiro	KL2
World Championships
Silver medal – second place	2018 Montemor-o-Velho	VL3
Bronze medal – third place	2013 Duisburg	K-1 TA
Bronze medal – third place	2014 Moscow	K-1 TA
Bronze medal – third place	2014 Moscow	V-1 TA
Bronze medal – third place	2017 Račice	VL2
Bronze medal – third place	2019 Szeged	VL3
Bronze medal – third place	2021 Copenhagen	VL3
European Championships
Gold medal – first place	2017 Plovdiv	VL2
Gold medal – first place	2021 Poznań	VL3
Silver medal – second place	2013 Montemor-o-Velho	K-1 TA
Silver medal – second place	2018 Belgrade	VL3
Silver medal – second place	2019 Poznań	VL3
Bronze medal – third place	2021 Poznań	KL2
Bronze medal – third place	2022 Munich	VL3

Nataliia Lagutenko (born 14 November 1985) is a Ukrainian Para canoeist. She competed in the paracanoeing competition at the 2016 Summer Paralympics, winning the silver medal in the women's KL2 event. Lagutenko also competed at the 2020 Summer Paralympics.
