= Susan Seipel =

Australian Para canoeist (born 1986)

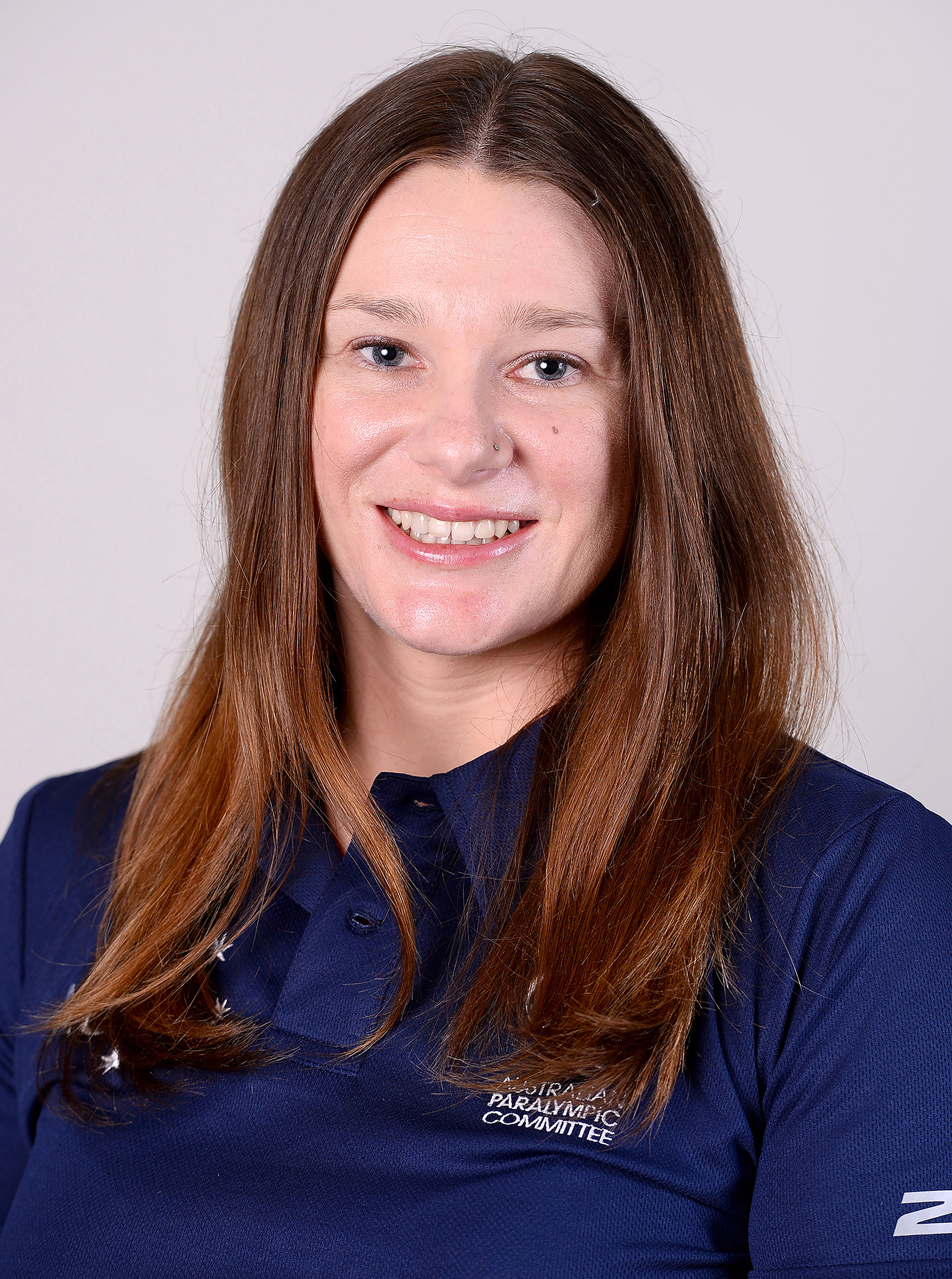
- 2016 Australian Paralympic team portrait

Personal information
- Born: 4 April 1986 (age 40) Ipswich, Queensland, Australia

Sport
- Country: Australia
- Sport: Para canoe
- Disability class: KL2, VL2
Medal record
Women's Para canoe
Representing Australia
Paralympic Games
Silver medal – second place	2020 Tokyo	VL2
Bronze medal – third place	2016 Rio de Janeiro	KL2
Bronze medal – third place	2024 Paris	VL2
World Championships
Gold medal – first place	2015 Milan	VL2
Gold medal – first place	2016 Duisburg	VL2
Gold medal – first place	2017 Račice	VL2
Silver medal – second place	2019 Szeged	VL2
Bronze medal – third place	2015 Milan	KL2
Bronze medal – third place	2016 Duisburg	KL2
Bronze medal – third place	2019 Szeged	KL2
Bronze medal – third place	2023 Duisburg	VL2
Bronze medal – third place	2024 Szeged	VL2

Susan Seipel (born 4 April 1986) is an Australian Para canoeist, a gold and bronze medallist in kayak and outrigger canoe at the 2015 and 2016 World Championships. She won a bronze medal at the 2016 Rio Paralympics and a silver medal at the 2020 Summer Paralympics. another bronze medal at 2024 Summer Paralympics

== Personal ==
Seipel, a Bellbowrie resident of Queensland, was born with Arthrogryposis Multiplex, a rare disorder characterised by fusion of joints and absent muscle formation in her legs. Born in Ipswich, Queensland she attended St Peter Claver College. In 2003, she completed Information Technology certificates and in 2004, a TAFE course in horse management. In 2008, she completed a Diploma of Applied Science, Equine Studies Major at the University of Queensland. She has undertaken a course in Professional Leadership at La Trobe University. Seipel was awarded a Full Sporting Blue at Griffith University whilst undertaking a Bachelor of Psychology (Hons).

She is a volunteer and ambassador for the RSPCA at Wacol, Queensland.

== Sporting career ==
=== Swimming ===
Seipel's sporting career began at the age of four as part of her physiotherapy program. She learned to swim at the Bellbowrie Club and competed against her able-bodied classmates at Our lady of the Rosary Primary School, Kenmore. She held six Queensland State records between the ages of 13 and 15 and three Australian National Age records in freestyle and backstroke.

=== Equestrian ===
At the age of seven, Seipel's sporting passion began to change after learning to ride horses at the McIntyre Riding Centre for the Disabled in the western suburbs of Brisbane. Seipel said: "We used to go past the Centre on the way to my school and I always saw the horses. I really loved animals and wanted to have a go there. My parents thought it would be good therapy and took me along." In 1998, she competed for the first time at the National Riding for Disabled (RDA) Dressage Championships, where she gained first place in her warm- up test against international riders. After competing at these Championships for nine successive years, Seipel made her International debut at the FEI Pacific Rim Para-equestrian Dressage International, held at Milner Downs Equestrian Centre in Langley, Canada. It was here she gave her best performance winning a bronze medal and qualified for the 2008 Summer Paralympics Beijing, China, but was not selected in the team to represent Australia.

Summary of equestrian achievements:

- Australian Para Dressage Team for the World Equestrian Games 2010
- Australian Riding for the Disabled (RDA) National Dressage Champion 1999, 2006, 2008
- Reserve Para Equestrian Dressage Champion 2010
- Short listed for 2008 Beijing Paralympics
- State Riding for the Disabled Queensland Dressage Champion 9 times
- 2007 Queensland Young Achiever for Sports Award
- 2009 Equestrian Australia National Para Dressage Development Squad
- 2010 Equestrian Australia National Para Dressage Elite Squad

In leaving Equestrian, Seipel said: "I did Equestrian for 18 years, competing at National and International level. I decided to take a break because it's quite an expensive sport".

=== Canoeing ===
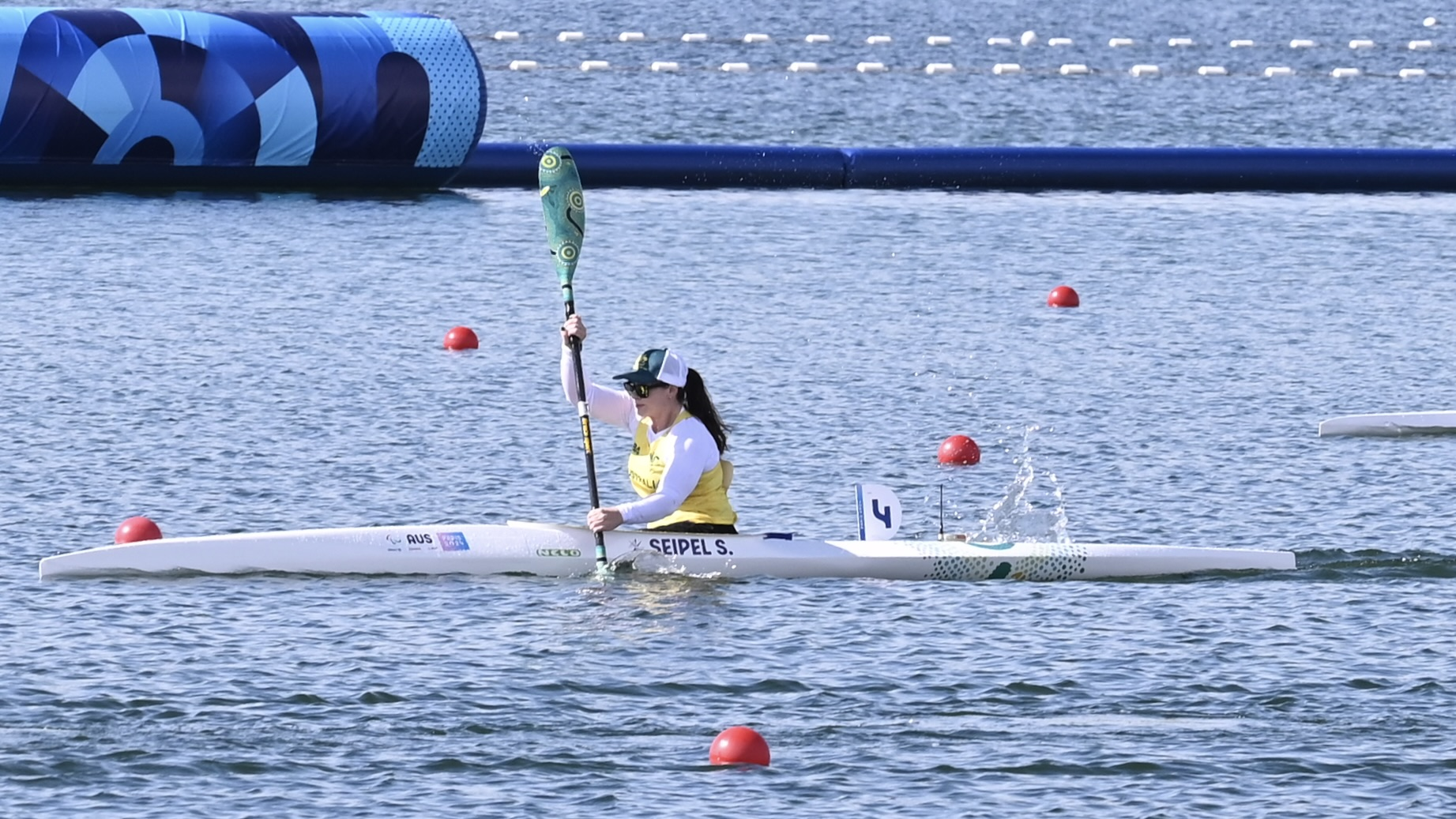
Seipel at the 2024 Summer Paralympics.

In 2012, Seipel attended a Para-canoe 'come and try day'. She was encouraged to take up Para-canoeing by Australian Olympian Amanda Rankin. and in 2013 joined the Brisbane Canoeing Club. Seipel is classified a KL2 and competed at the 2014 ICF Canoe Sprint World Championships in Moscow where she finished sixth in the Women's KL2 (formerly TA) K1 200m.

Determined to pursue her competitive spirit, Seipel mastered the kayak (K1) and outrigger (V1) canoes winning in both boats at domestic trials. At the 2015 ICF Canoe Sprint World Championships in Milan Italy, she won the gold medal in the Women's V–1 200 m VL2 and bronze medal in the Women's K–1 200 m KL2, a 2016 Rio Paralympics event.

Following her success, and with the support of Australian Canoeing, Seipel decided to move from Brisbane to the Gold Coast Queensland, where she could train full-time with the national coach Andrea King and access the AIS training facilities at Varsity Lakes.

At the 2016 ICF Para-canoe World Championships, Duisburg, Germany, she won the gold medal in the Women's 200 m Vl2 and bronze medal in the Women's 200 m KL2, a Paralympic Games event.

Seipel won the bronze medal in the 200 m KL2 when paracanoe made its debut at the Rio Paralympics.

At the 2017 ICF Canoe Sprint World Championships, Račice, Czech Republic, she won the gold medal in Women's VL2 200m and finished fourth in the Women's KL2 200m. At the 2018 ICF Canoe Sprint World Championships, Montemor-o-Velho, Portugal, she finished sixth in the Women's KL2 200m and fourth in the Women's VL2 200m.

At the 2019 ICF Canoe Sprint World Championships, Szeged, Hungary, she won the silver medal in the Women's VL2 200m and bronze medal in the Women's KL2 200m.

At the 2020 Summer Paralympics. Seipel won a silver medal in the Women's VL2 200m with a time of 1:01.481, over 4 seconds longer than the eventual winner Emma Wiggs of Great Britain. Seipel also competed in the Women's KL2 200m and came seventh.

Seipel finished fifth in both the Women's KL2 200m and VL2 200m at the 2022 ICF Canoe Sprint World Championships.

She has been selected to compete at the 2024 Summer Paralympics in Paris, France. In the lead up to the Paralympics, Seipel won a bronze medal at the 2024 ICF World Para Canoe Championships in Szeged, Hungary.

In 2021, she was awarded Paddle Australia's Paracanoeist of the Year.

Seipel trained with the Brisbane Canoeing Club and announced her retirement from canoeing in February 2025.

=== Ice hockey ===
Seipel is part of the Australian team for the 2026 Women's World Para Ice Hockey Championships in the New South Wales city of Newcastle.
