= Prachi Yadav =

Indian Paracanoe athlete

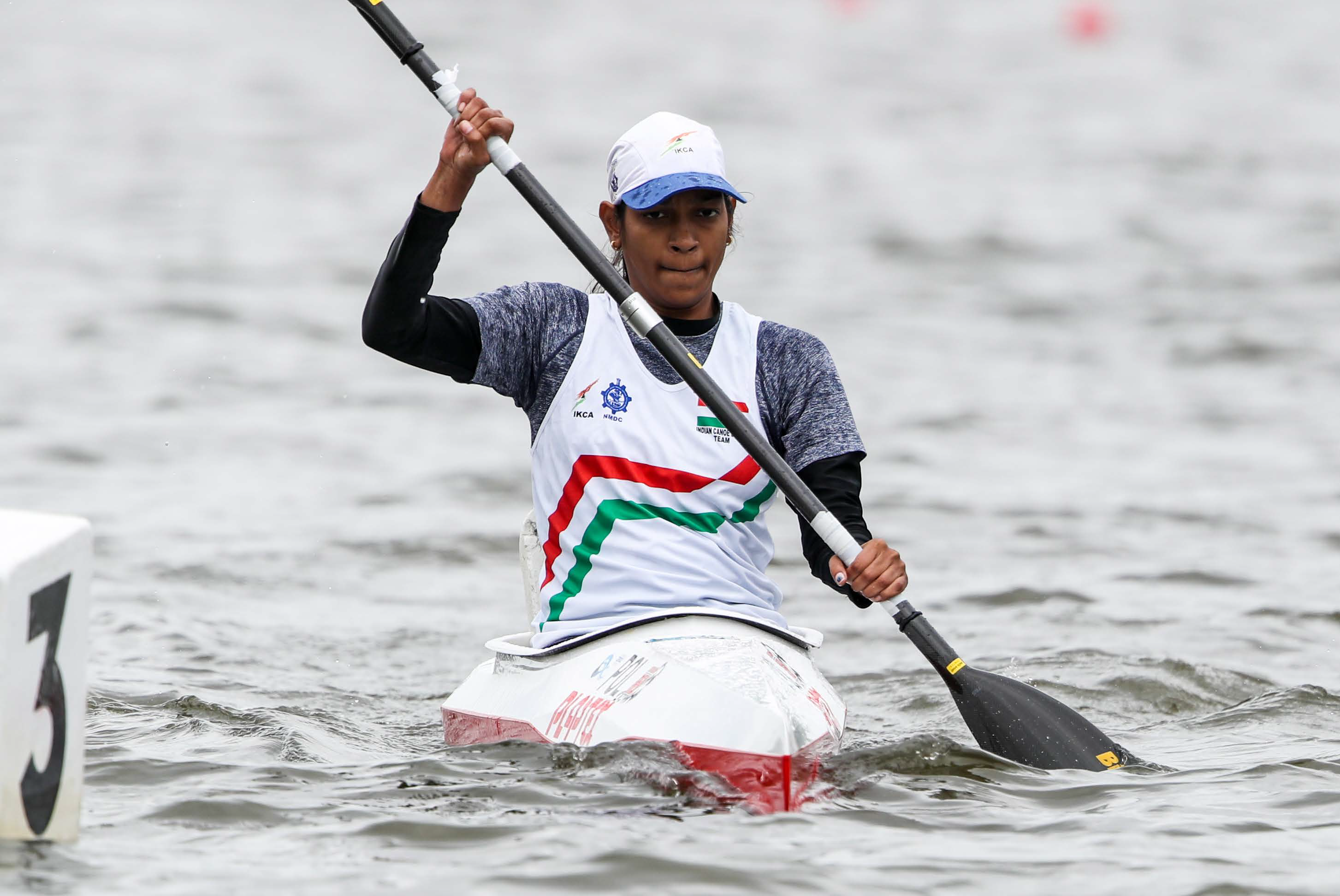

Personal information
- Nationality: Indian
- Born: 29 May 1995 (age 31) Gwalior, Madhya Pradesh
- Height: 5 ft 6 in (168 cm)
- Weight: 62 KG

Sport
- Country: India
- Sport: Paracanoe
- Event: Women VL2 / Women KL2
- Coached by: Capt. Pijush Kanti Baroi
Medal record
Representing India
Asian Para Games
Gold medal – first place	2022 Hangzhou	Women's KL2
Silver medal – second place	2022 Hangzhou	Women's VL2

Prachi Yadav (born 29 May 1995) is an Indian Paracanoe Athlete who participated in 2020 Tokyo Paralympics. Yadav won the bronze medal in the 2022 Paralympic World Cup.

In the 2022 ICF Canoe Sprint World Championships, Yadav made it to the top 10 in 1:11.15 minutes while staying inside the Women's VL2, Earlier Paracanoeing at the 2020 Summer Paralympics – Women's VL2 – Women's VL2 recorded its place in 11.098 minutes and reached the finals in 2019 ICF Canoe Sprint World Championships – Women's VL2, winning in 16:35 minutes.

== Personal life ==
Yadav was born on 29 May 1995 in Gwalior, Madhya Pradesh, India. Her father Jagdish Singh Yadav was a retired Deputy Director in Agriculture Department and her Mother Chandra Kumari Yadav died of cancer in 2003. She is married to Manish Kaurav, who is also a paracanoeist. She has also participated in para swimming nationals.

== Career ==
She started her paracanoe career in 2018 switching from para swimming on the recommendation of her coach Virender Kumar Dabas. She trains at Lower Lake in Bhopal, India. She reached the finals with her outstanding performance in the Women's Va'a Single 200m canoe sprint and finished 8th with a timing of 1:07.329. She is part of the Target Olympic Podium Scheme (TOPS).

=== Paralympics ===
At the 2020 Summer Paralympics, Yadav became the first ever Indian canoeist to qualify for paracanoeing at the 2020 Summer Paralympics at Tokyo, Japan

At the 2024 Summer Paralympics, Yadav qualified for the final and finished eighth in the Women's VL2 200m sprint event with a time of 1:08.55. Earlier, she clocked 1:05.66 to qualify third in the semifinals.

== Tournaments record ==
International Competition Results
Year	Event	Category	Location	Timing	Distance	Place
2025	Asian Paracanoe Championships	KL2 Women	Pattaya, Rayong (Thailand)	01:14.474	200 Metres	Gold
2025	Asian Paracanoe Championships	KL2 Women	Pattaya, Rayong (Thailand)	02:47.077	500 Metres	Gold
2025	Asian Paracanoe Championships	VL2 Women	Pattaya, Rayong (Thailand)	01:04.546	200 Metres	Gold
2025	Asian Paracanoe Championships	VL2 Women	Pattaya, Rayong (Thailand)	02:50.763	500 Metres	Silver
2025	ICF Paracanoe World Cup	KL2 Women	Poznan (Poland)	00:55.094	200 Metres	Bronze
2024	ACC Paracanoe Asian Championships	VL2 Women	Tokyo (Japan)	01:04.063	200 Metres	Gold
2024	ACC Paracanoe Asian Championships	KL2 Women	Tokyo (Japan)	00:58.330	200 Metres	Gold
2023	4th Asian Para Games	KL2 Women	Hangzhou (China)	00:54.962	200 Metres	Gold
2023	4th Asian Para Games	VL2 Women	Hangzhou (China)	01:03.147	200 Metres	Silver
2023	3rd Asian Paracanoe Championship	VL2 Women	Samarkand (Uzbekistan)	01:11.259	200 Metres	Gold
2023	3rd Asian Paracanoe Championship	KL2 Women	Samarkand (Uzbekistan)	01:00.725	200 Metres	Silver
2023	3rd Asian Paracanoe Championship	KL2 Women	Samarkand (Uzbekistan)	02:38.441	500 Metres	Gold
2023	3rd Asian Paracanoe Championship	VL2 Women	Samarkand (Uzbekistan)	02:55.482	500 Metres	Gold
2022	ICF Canoe Sprint & Paracanoe World Cup	VL2 Women	Poznan (Poland)	01:04.71	200 Metres	Bronze
2022	Asian Canoe Para Qualifiers For Asian Para Games	VL2 Women	Rayong (Thailand)	01:07.200	200 Metres	Gold

National Competition Results
Year	Event	CATEGORY	Location	Timing	Distance	Place
2025	18th National Paracanoe Championships	KL2 Women	Bhopal	01:03.127	200 Metres	Gold
2025	18th National Paracanoe Championships	VL2 Women	Bhopal	01:09.652	200 Metres	Gold
2024	17th National Paracanoe Championships	KL2 Women	Bhopal	00:53.283	200 Metres	Gold
2024	17th National Paracanoe Championships	VL2 Women	Bhopal	01:02.412	200 Metres	Gold
2022	16th National Paracanoe Championships	VL2 Women	Bhopal	01:06.675	200 Metres	Gold
2022	16th National Paracanoe Championships	KL2 Women	Bhopal	01:00.838	200 Metres	Gold
2022	15th National Paracanoe Championships and Paracanoe Classification	VL2 Women	Bhopal	00:58.121	200 Metres	Gold
2022	15th National Paracanoe Championships and Paracanoe Classification	KL2 Women	Bhopal	00:58.14	200 Metres	Silver
2021	14th National Paracanoe Championships	VL2 Women	Bhopal	01:03.19	200 Metres	Gold
2021	14th National Paracanoe Championships	KL2 Women	Bhopal	01:13.84	200 Metres	Gold
2020	National Paracanoe Competition & Paracanoe Classification	VL2 Women	Bhind	01:55.00	200 Metres	Silver
2020	National Paracanoe Competition & Paracanoe Classification	KL2 Women	Bhind	01:05.00	200 Metres	Silver
2019	29th National Canoe Sprint & Paracanoe Championships	KL2 Women	Delhi	00:57.11	200 Metres	Gold
2019	29th National Canoe Sprint & Paracanoe Championships	VL2 Women	Delhi	01:23.03	200 Metres	Silver

== Awards ==
- 2020: Vikram Award by Government of Madhya Pradesh on National Sports Day.
- 2023: Arjuna Award
