= Pascale Bercovitch =

French-Israeli rower, cyclist, and canoer

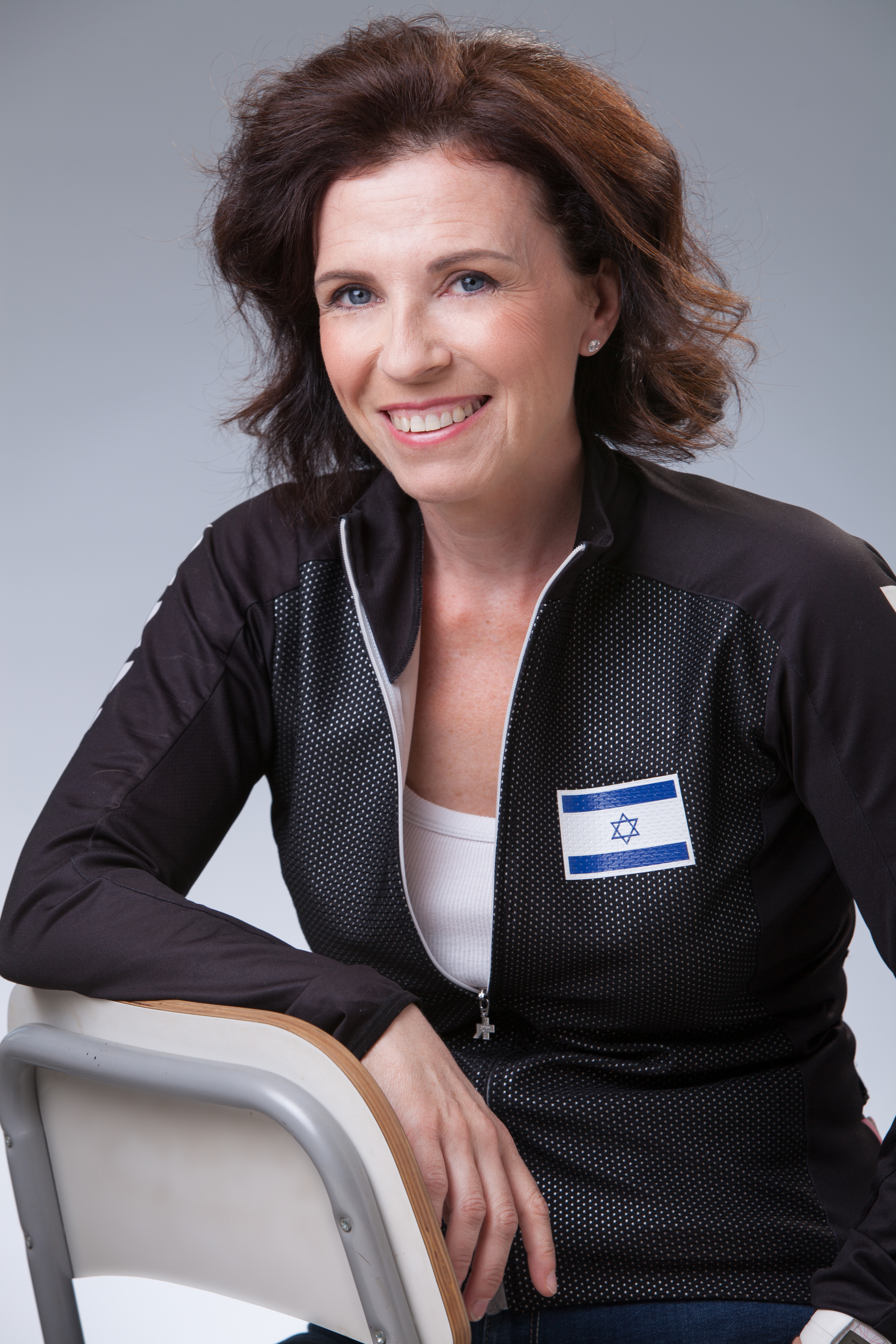
- Bercovitch in 2013

Personal information
- Native name: 'פסקל ברקוביץ
- Full name: Pascale Noa Bercovitch
- Nationality: Israeli French
- Born: August 21, 1967 (age 59) Angers, France
- Website: www.pascale.org.il

Sport
- Sport: Kayak, Cycling, Rowing, Swimming
- Team: Israeli National Paralympic Team
Medal record
Women's paralympic rowing
Representing Israel
World Cup
Silver medal – second place	2008 Munich	ASW1x

Pascale Noa Bercovitch (Hebrew: פסקל ברקוביץ'; born August 21, 1967) is a Franco-Israeli writer, Israeli film director and paralympic athlete.

== Early life ==
Bercovitch was born in France to Jewish father and non-Jewish mother. In her youth, she was a track and field champion of Picardy. On 13 December 1984, aged 17, she slipped while in a train station in Angers and got pulled under an incoming train, causing the amputation of both of her legs above the knee. She was preparing at the time to immigrate to Israel, fulfilling her plans shortly later and volunteering to serve with the Israel Defense Forces. Following her military service she began practicing disabled sports, attempting to achieve the criteria for the 1992 Summer Paralympics.

== Journalism and film ==
In the early 1990s, Bercovitch began working in different fields of communications, becoming a journalist, writer and a film director, while still practicing sports and delivering her first daughter. As a journalist, Bercovitch dealt with disabled people, serving as a journalist on the subject in a morning television show and directing three documentaries, one of which on the Israeli delegation to the 2000 Summer Paralympics. Throughout these years she was training herself in abseiling, mountain climbing and wheelchair dancing.

In 2008, Bercovitch directed a documentary titled Three Hundredths of a Second.

== Paralympic sports career ==
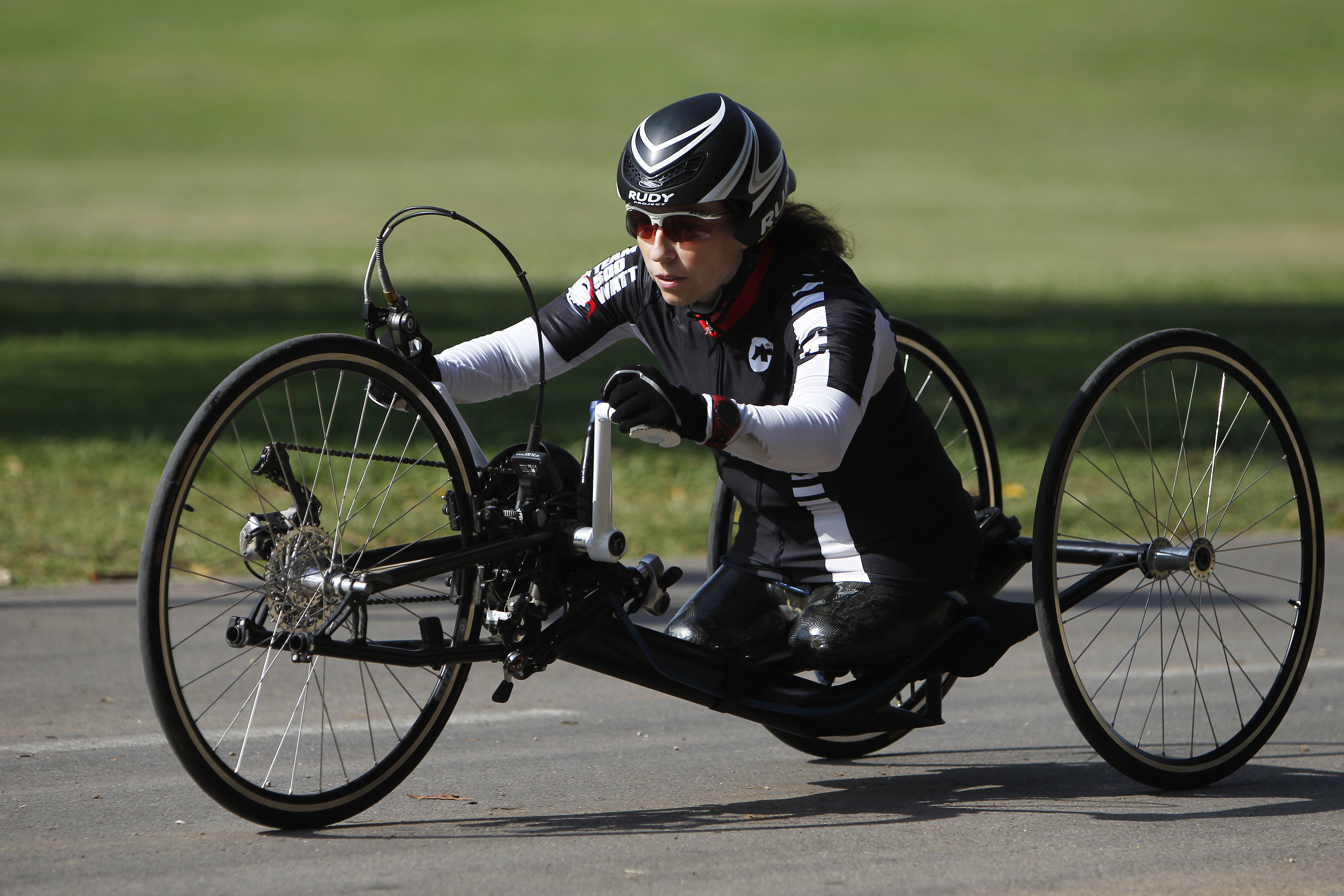
Bercovitch on a handbike in 2012

Bercovitch was asked in 2007 to join the Israeli paralympic rowing team. While never practicing this sport, she had been given ten months to be included in the final list of participants to the 2008 Summer Paralympics. Her silver medal won at the 2008 World Rowing Cup competitions in Germany enabled her to do so. She was a rower at the 2008 Paralympics, where she competed in the women's single sculls event but did not advance to the finals.

She competed in para-cycling at the 2012 Summer Paralympics, placing sixth in handcycling at the women's H4 events in road time trial (16 km) and road race (48 km).

Bercovitch then switched to paracanoe, competing in the women's kayak single KL2 200 m events at the 2015 World Championships, the 2016 Summer Paralympics, and the 2017 World Championships.

== Honors ==
In 2014 Bercovitch was honored as one of the torchbearers in the national Israeli Independence Day ceremony.

== Published works ==
- Oline, le dauphin du miracle (The dolphin's boy). Paris, 1999. ISBN 2-221-08907-3

== Film productions ==
Title	Produced by	Directed by	Format	Length	Year	Country	Language	Awards
Three Hundredths of a Second	Pascale Noa Bercovitch	Pascale Noa Bercovitch	Documentary	55mins	2008	Israel	Hebrew	2006 Paralympic Film Festival, Hungary
