= Katalin Varga (canoeist) =

Hungarian Para canoeist (born 1986)

Personal information
- Full name: Katalin Eszter Varga
- Born: 12 April 1986 (age 40) Budapest, Hungary

Sport
- Country: Hungary
- Sport: Para canoe
- Disability class: KL2
- Club: NKM Szeged
Medal record
Women's Para canoe
Representing Hungary
Paralympic Games
| Bronze medal – third place | 2020 Tokyo | KL2 |
Sprint World Championships
| Silver medal – second place | 2024 Szeged | KL2 |
| Silver medal – second place | 2025 MIlan | KL2 |
| Silver medal – second place | 2026 Poznán | KL2 |
| Bronze medal – third place | 2021 Copenhagen | KL2 |
| Bronze medal – third place | 2022 Dartmouth | KL2 |
| Bronze medal – third place | 2023 Duisburg | KL2 |
Sprint European Championships
| Gold medal – first place | 2024 Szeged | KL2 |
| Silver medal – second place | 2021 Poznań | KL2 |
| Silver medal – second place | 2025 Račice | KL2 |
| Bronze medal – third place | 2019 Poznań | KL2 |
| Bronze medal – third place | 2022 Munich | KL2 |
| Bronze medal – third place | 2026 Montemor-o-Velho | KL2 |
Marathon World Championships
| Silver medal – second place | 2025 Győr | KL2 |

Katalin Eszter Varga (born 12 April 1986) is a Hungarian Para canoeist. She represented Hungary at the 2020 Summer Paralympics.

== Career ==
Varga represented Hungary at the 2020 Summer Paralympics in the women's KL2 event and won a bronze medal.

She competed at the 2021 ICF Canoe Sprint World Championships and won a bronze medal in the women's KL2 event. She again won a bronze medal at the 2022 and 2023 ICF Canoe Sprint World Championships.

In September 2025, she competed at the 2025 ICF Canoe Marathon World Championships and won a silver medal in the KL2 event with a time of 33:04.75. This marked the first time paracanoe was competed in marathon distances at the ICF Canoe Marathon World Championships.
