= Anja Adler =

German Paracanoeist (born 1989)

Personal information
- Nationality: German
- Born: 14 April 1989 (age 37)
- Website: anjaadler-kanu.de

Sport
- Country: Germany
- Sport: Para canoe
- Disability class: KL2, VL3
- Club: SV Halle
Medal record
Women's Para canoe
Representing Germany
Paralympic Games
Bronze medal – third place	2024 Paris	KL2
Sprint World Championships
Silver medal – second place	2017 Račice	VL3
Bronze medal – third place	2024 Szeged	KL2
Bronze medal – third place	2025 MIlan	KL2
Bronze medal – third place	2026 Poznán	KL2
Sprint European Championships
Bronze medal – third place	2025 Račice	KL2
Marathon World Championships
Gold medal – first place	2025 Győr	KL2

Anja Adler (born 14 April 1998) is a German Para canoeist. She represented Germany at the 2020 and 2024 Summer Paralympics.

== Career ==
Adler first began paracanoeing in 2016. That year, she won silver at the German Paracanoe Championships. She qualified for the German national team in 2017. She won silver at the 2022 ICF Para-Canoe World Championships with a time of 1:08.241. Adler won bronze in VL3 at the 2018 Paracanoe European Championships and placed fourth in KL2. She placed fourth in VL3 at the 2019 Paracanoe European Championships. At the 2020 Summer Paralympics, Adler represented Germany, placing fourth in the women's KL2 paracanoe event.

Adler won two silver medals at the Paracanoe European Championships, one in KL2 and the other in va'a. She won the 2021 Paracanoe European Championships in women's KL2. Adler placed fourth in KL2 at the 2022 Paracanoe European Championships, racing a new personal best time. She won the 2022 Deutschland-Cup and the 2022 ICF Paracanoe World Cup.

Adler placed third at the 2024 Paracanoe World Championships in women's KL2 with a time of 52.64 and placed second in KL2 at the 2024 Paracanoe European Championships. She represented Germany at the 2024 Summer Paralympics in the women's KL2 event and won a bronze medal with a time of 52.17. In June 2025, she competed at the 2025 Canoe Sprint European Championships and won a bronze medal in the KL2 event. In August 2025, she competed at the 2025 ICF Canoe Sprint World Championships and won a bronze medal in the KL2 event. The next month she competed at the 2025 ICF Canoe Marathon World Championships and won a gold medal in the KL2 event with a time of 32:29.23. This marked the first time paracanoe was competed in marathon distances at the ICF Canoe Marathon World Championships.

== Personal life ==
Adler is from Halle (Saale). She attended the University of Halle, studying geology, and then obtained a master's degree in meteorology from Leipzig University. During a cave exploration as part of her doctoral thesis in 2015, Adler was in an accident that left her paraplegic.
