= 2019 ICF Canoe Sprint World Championships – Women's KL3 =

Women's KL3 at the 2019 ICF Canoe Sprint World Championships
- Venue: Olympic Centre of Szeged
- Location: Szeged, Hungary
- Dates: 21–23 August
- Competitors: 25 from 21 nations
- Winning time: 47.29

Medalists
gold medal	Shakhnoza Mirzaeva	Uzbekistan
silver medal	Laura Sugar	Great Britain
bronze medal	Shahla Behrouzirad	Iran

The women's KL3 competition at the 2019 ICF Canoe Sprint World Championships in Szeged took place at the Olympic Centre of Szeged.

== Schedule ==
The schedule was as follows:

Date	Time	Round
Wednesday 21 August 2019	16:10	Heats
Thursday 22 August 2019	11:10	Semifinals
Friday 23 August 2019	11:00	Final B
Friday 23 August 2019	11:15	Final A

All times are Central European Summer Time (UTC+2)

== Results ==
=== Heats ===
Heat winners advanced directly to the A final.
The next six fastest boats in each heat advanced to the semifinals.

==== Heat 1 ====
Rank	Name	Country	Time	Notes
1	Hope Gordon	Great Britain	49.33	QA
2	Cai Yuqingyan	China	51.05	QS
3	Erica Scarff	Canada	51.36	QS
4	Helene Ripa	Sweden	51.62	QS
5	Felicia Laberer	Germany	52.52	QS
6	Kelly Allen	United States	54.62	QS
7	Silvia Elvira	Spain	55.67	QS
8	Ehinmore Ayomide	Nigeria	55.71	
9	Annamária Fehér	Hungary	59.50	

==== Heat 2 ====
Rank	Name	Country	Time	Notes
1	Shakhnoza Mirzaeva	Uzbekistan	47.35	QA
2	Amanda Reynolds	Australia	49.03	QS
3	Katarzyna Sobczak	Poland	50.06	QS
4	Larisa Volik	Russia	51.53	QS
5	Amanda Embriaco	Italy	51.89	QS
6	Precious Bosede Omoboni	Nigeria	52.81	QS
7	Manon Doyelle	France	53.67	QS
8	Maryia Mironava	Belarus	58.47	

==== Heat 3 ====
Rank	Name	Country	Time	Notes
1	Laura Sugar	Great Britain	46.86	QA
2	Shahla Behrouzirad	Iran	47.82	QS
3	Nélia Barbosa	France	48.19	QS
4	Mari Christina Santilli	Brazil	50.84	QS
5	Zhanyl Baltabayeva	Kazakhstan	54.18	QS
6	Mariel Andrea Graziani	Argentina	54.74	QS
7	Yoshimi Kaji	Japan	54.81	QS
8	Nikoletta Molnár	Hungary	56.65	

=== Semifinals ===
Qualification was as follows:

The fastest three boats in each semi advanced to the A final.
The next four fastest boats in each semi, plus the fastest remaining boat advanced to the B final.

==== Semifinal 1 ====
Rank	Name	Country	Time	Notes
1	Shahla Behrouzirad	Iran	48.10	QA
2	Katarzyna Sobczak	Poland	49.89	QA
3	Mari Christina Santilli	Brazil	51.25	QA
4	Erica Scarff	Canada	51.34	QB
5	Larisa Volik	Russia	51.71	QB
6	Felicia Laberer	Germany	52.26	QB
7	Precious Bosede Omoboni	Nigeria	52.48	QB
8	Yoshimi Kaji	Japan	54.79	qB
9	Kelly Allen	United States	55.43	

==== Semifinal 2 ====
Rank	Name	Country	Time	Notes
1	Nélia Barbosa	France	48.84	QA
2	Amanda Reynolds	Australia	49.14	QA
3	Cai Yuqingyan	China	51.11	QA
4	Helene Ripa	Sweden	51.49	QB
5	Amanda Embriaco	Italy	51.63	QB
6	Manon Doyelle	France	53.28	QB
7	Mariel Andrea Graziani	Argentina	54.86	QB
8	Silvia Elvira	Spain	55.47	
9	Zhanyl Baltabayeva	Kazakhstan	55.78	

=== Finals ===
==== Final B ====
Competitors in this final raced for positions 10 to 18.

Rank	Name	Country	Time
1	Helene Ripa	Sweden	51.03
2	Amanda Embriaco	Italy	51.35
3	Erica Scarff	Canada	51.36
4	Larisa Volik	Russia	51.68
5	Precious Bosede Omoboni	Nigeria	52.01
6	Felicia Laberer	Germany	52.64
7	Manon Doyelle	France	52.86
8	Yoshimi Kaji	Japan	54.56
9	Mariel Andrea Graziani	Argentina	54.93

==== Final A ====
Competitors raced for positions 1 to 9, with medals going to the top three.

Rank	Name	Country	Time
1st place, gold medalist(s)	Shakhnoza Mirzaeva	Uzbekistan	47.29
2nd place, silver medalist(s)	Laura Sugar	Great Britain	47.32
3rd place, bronze medalist(s)	Shahla Behrouzirad	Iran	48.96
4	Nélia Barbosa	France	49.14
5	Hope Gordon	Great Britain	49.85
6	Katarzyna Sobczak	Poland	50.31
7	Amanda Reynolds	Australia	50.46
8	Mari Christina Santilli	Brazil	51.48
9	Cai Yuqingyan	China	51.78
