= Canoe at the 2016 Summer Paralympics – Women's KL3 =

Women's KL3 at the XV Paralympic Games
- Venue: Lagoa Rodrigo de Freitas
- Dates: 14–15 September 2016
- Competitors: 10 from 10 nations

Medalists
1st place, gold medalist(s)		Anne Dickins	Great Britain
2nd place, silver medalist(s)		Amanda Reynolds	Australia
3rd place, bronze medalist(s)		Cindy Moreau	France

The Canoe Sprint women's KL3 event at the 2016 Paralympic Games took place on 14 and 15 September 2016, at the Lagoa Rodrigo de Freitas. Two heats were held. Winners and runners up advanced directly to the final. The rest went into the semifinal, where the top four advanced to the final.

== Heats ==
=== Heat 1 ===
9:40 14 September 2016:

Rank	Lane	Name	Nationality	Time	Notes
1	6	Anne Dickins	Great Britain	53.591	F
2	7	Veronica Yoko Plebani	Italy	55.466	F
3	8	Helene Ripa	Sweden	56.825	SF
4	4	Kelly Allen	United States	58.327	SF
5	5	Shahla Behrouzirad	Iran	58.900	SF

=== Heat 2 ===
9:45 14 September 2016:

Rank	Lane	Name	Nationality	Time	Notes
1	6	Amanda Reynolds	Australia	53.412	F
2	8	Cindy Moreau	France	53.731	F
3	5	Erica Scarff	Canada	54.904	SF
4	7	Mihaela Lulea	Romania	55.479	SF
5	4	Mari Christina Santilli	Brazil	57.312	SF

== Semifinal ==
10:43 14 September 2016:

Rank	Lane	Name	Nationality	Time	Notes
1	5	Mihaela Lulea	Romania	54.665	F
2	7	Helene Ripa	Sweden	54.735	F
3	6	Erica Scarff	Canada	55.525	F
4	8	Kelly Allen	United States	56.347	F
5	3	Shahla Behrouzirad	Iran	56.580	
6	4	Mari Christina Santilli	Brazil	57.357	

== Final ==
9:52 15 September 2016:

Rank	Lane	Name	Nationality	Time	Notes
1st place, gold medalist(s)	5	Anne Dickins	Great Britain	51.348	
2nd place, silver medalist(s)	4	Amanda Reynolds	Australia	51.378	
3rd place, bronze medalist(s)	6	Cindy Moreau	France	52.103	
4	2	Mihaela Lulea	Romania	52.273	
5	7	Helene Ripa	Sweden	52.492	
6	3	Veronica Yoko Plebani	Italy	52.802	
7	1	Erica Scarff	Canada	53.916	
8	8	Kelly Allen	United States	54.720	
