= 2017 ICF Canoe Sprint World Championships – Women's KL3 =

Women's KL3 at the 2017 ICF Canoe Sprint World Championships
- Venue: Sportcentrum Račice
- Location: Račice, Czech Republic
- Dates: 23–24 August
- Competitors: 15 from 15 nations
- Winning time: 50.344

Medalists
gold medal	Amanda Reynolds	Australia
silver medal	Shakhnoza Mirzaeva	Uzbekistan
bronze medal	Mihaela Lulea	Romania

The women's KL3 competition at the 2017 ICF Canoe Sprint World Championships in Račice took place at the Sportcentrum Račice.

== Schedule ==
The schedule was as follows:

Date	Time	Round
Wednesday 23 August 2017	10:20	Heats
Wednesday 23 August 2017	11:30	Semifinal
Thursday 24 August 2017	12:34	Final

All times are Central European Summer Time (UTC+2)

== Results ==
=== Heats ===
The fastest three boats in each heat advanced directly to the final. The next four fastest boats in each heat, plus the fastest remaining boat advanced to the semifinal.

==== Heat 1 ====
Rank	Name	Country	Time	Notes
1	Shakhnoza Mirzaeva	Uzbekistan	49.521	QF
2	Amanda Reynolds	Australia	49.571	QF
3	Erica Scarff	Canada	52.004	QF
4	Mari Christina Santilli	Brazil	53.626	QS
5	Elena Naveiro	Spain	55.310	QS
6	Anja Adler	Germany	55.493	QS
7	Annamária Fehér	Hungary	1:06.310	QS

==== Heat 2 ====
Rank	Name	Country	Time	Notes
1	Mihaela Lulea	Romania	50.981	QF
2	Shahla Behrouzirad	Iran	51.159	QF
3	Helene Ripa	Sweden	51.181	QF
4	Cindy Moreau	France	51.681	QS
5	Larisa Volik	Russia	53.320	QS
6	Kelly Allen	United States	54.642	QS
7	Katarzyna Sobczak	Poland	58.464	QS
–	Maryia Mironava	Belarus	DSQ	

=== Semifinal ===
The fastest three boats advanced to the final.

Rank	Name	Country	Time	Notes
1	Cindy Moreau	France	51.640	QF
2	Larisa Volik	Russia	52.890	QF
3	Mari Christina Santilli	Brazil	53.085	QF
4	Kelly Allen	United States	54.440	
5	Elena Naveiro	Spain	54.935	
6	Anja Adler	Germany	55.102	
7	Katarzyna Sobczak	Poland	55.746	
8	Annamária Fehér	Hungary	1:05.407	

=== Final ===
Competitors raced for positions 1 to 9, with medals going to the top three.

Rank	Name	Country	Time
1st place, gold medalist(s)	Amanda Reynolds	Australia	50.344
2nd place, silver medalist(s)	Shakhnoza Mirzaeva	Uzbekistan	51.778
3rd place, bronze medalist(s)	Mihaela Lulea	Romania	52.033
4	Erica Scarff	Canada	52.444
5	Shahla Behrouzirad	Iran	52.617
6	Cindy Moreau	France	52.750
7	Helene Ripa	Sweden	52.994
8	Mari Christina Santilli	Brazil	55.305
9	Larisa Volik	Russia	55.322
