= 2016 ICF Paracanoe World Championships – Women's KL3 =

Women's KL3 at the 2016 ICF Paracanoe World Championships
- Location: Duisburg, Germany
- Dates: 17–19 May
- Competitors: 17 from 13 nations
- Winning time: 51.246

Medalists
gold medal	Anne Dickins	Great Britain
silver medal	Amanda Reynolds	Australia
bronze medal	Mihaela Lulea	Romania

The women's KL3 competition at the 2016 ICF Paracanoe World Championships took place in Duisburg.

== Schedule ==
The schedule was as follows:

Date	Time	Round
Tuesday 17 May 2016	15:25	Heats
Wednesday 18 May 2016	11:40	Semifinal
Thursday 19 May 2016	11:30	Final

All times are Central European Summer Time (UTC+2)

== Results ==
=== Heats ===
The fastest three boats in each heat advanced directly to the final. The next four fastest boats in each heat, plus the fastest remaining boat advanced to the semifinal.

==== Heat 1 ====
Rank	Name	Country	Time	Notes
1	Amanda Reynolds	Australia	51.702	QF
2	Mihaela Lulea	Romania	52.337	QF
3	Shahla Behrouzirad	Iran	53.360	QF
4	Mari Christina Santilli	Brazil	54.684	QS
5	Kelda Wood	Great Britain	55.641	QS
6	Helene Ripa	Sweden	56.567	QS
7	Cai Yuqingyan	China	56.630	QS
8	Anja Pierce	United States	57.651	qS
9	Daniela Sjöberg-Holtkamp	Germany	58.506	

==== Heat 2 ====
Rank	Name	Country	Time	Notes
1	Anne Dickins	Great Britain	51.730	QF
2	Veronica Yoko Plebani	Italy	52.957	QF
3	Erica Scarff	Canada	54.002	QF
4	Kelly Allen	United States	55.364	QS
5	Elena Naveiro	Spain	56.677	QS
6	Larisa Volik	Russia	57.124	QS
7	Silvia Elvira	Spain	58.154	QS
8	Aline Souza Lopes	Brazil	58.182	

=== Semifinal ===
The fastest three boats advanced to the final.

Rank	Name	Country	Time	Notes
1	Mari Christina Santilli	Brazil	53.112	QF
2	Kelly Allen	United States	53.274	QF
3	Helene Ripa	Sweden	53.878	QF
4	Kelda Wood	Great Britain	54.867	
5	Elena Naveiro	Spain	55.076	
6	Larisa Volik	Russia	55.310	
7	Cai Yuqingyan	China	55.767	
8	Anja Pierce	United States	56.218	
9	Silvia Elvira	Spain	56.803	

=== Final ===
Competitors raced for positions 1 to 9, with medals going to the top three.

Rank	Name	Country	Time
1st place, gold medalist(s)	Anne Dickins	Great Britain	51.246
2nd place, silver medalist(s)	Amanda Reynolds	Australia	51.686
3rd place, bronze medalist(s)	Mihaela Lulea	Romania	52.525
4	Veronica Yoko Plebani	Italy	52.569
5	Shahla Behrouzirad	Iran	52.884
6	Erica Scarff	Canada	54.431
7	Mari Christina Santilli	Brazil	54.868
8	Kelly Allen	United States	54.885
9	Helene Ripa	Sweden	57.262
