= 2021 ICF Canoe Sprint World Championships – Women's KL3 =

Women's KL3 at the 2021 ICF Canoe Sprint World Championships
- Venue: Lake Bagsværd
- Location: Copenhagen, Denmark
- Dates: 16–18 September
- Competitors: 14 from 13 nations
- Winning time: 47.77

Medalists
| gold medal | Laura Sugar | Great Britain |
| silver medal | Hope Gordon | Great Britain |
| bronze medal | Nélia Barbosa | France |

The women's KL3 competition at the 2021 ICF Canoe Sprint World Championships in Copenhagen took place on Lake Bagsværd.

== Schedule ==
The schedule was as follows:

| Date | Time | Round |
|---|---|---|
| Thursday 16 September 2021 | 15:55 | Heats |
| Friday 17 September 2021 | 11:10 | Semifinal |
| Saturday 18 September 2021 | 10:32 | Final |

All times are Central European Summer Time (UTC+2)

== Results ==
=== Heats ===
The fastest three boats in each heat advanced directly to the final. The next four fastest boats in each heat, plus the fastest remaining boat advanced to the semifinal.

==== Heat 1 ====
| Rank | Name | Country | Time | Notes |
|---|---|---|---|---|
| 1 | Laura Sugar | Great Britain | 48.84 | QF |
| 2 | Nikoletta Molnár | Hungary | 52.67 | QF |
| 3 | Mari Christina Santilli | Brazil | 52.79 | QF |
| 4 | Katarzyna Kozikowska | Poland | 53.08 | QS |
| 5 | Erica Scarff | Canada | 55.36 | QS |
| 6 | Zhanyl Baltabayeva | Kazakhstan | 56.05 | QS |
| 7 | Larisa Volik | RCF | 58.20 | QS |

==== Heat 2 ====
| Rank | Name | Country | Time | Notes |
|---|---|---|---|---|
| 1 | Hope Gordon | Great Britain | 49.68 | QF |
| 2 | Nélia Barbosa | France | 50.23 | QF |
| 3 | Felicia Laberer | Germany | 50.70 | QF |
| 4 | Helene Ripa | Sweden | 52.04 | QS |
| 5 | Yoshimi Kaji | Japan | 53.60 | QS |
| 6 | Amanda Embriaco | Italy | 54.23 | QS |
| – | Sangeeta Rajput | India | DNS | |

=== Semifinal ===
The fastest three boats advanced to the final.

| Rank | Name | Country | Time | Notes |
|---|---|---|---|---|
| 1 | Katarzyna Kozikowska | Poland | 51.08 | QF |
| 2 | Helene Ripa | Sweden | 55.60 | QF |
| 3 | Amanda Embriaco | Italy | 1:02.05 | QF |
| 4 | Yoshimi Kaji | Japan | 1:15.55 | |
| 5 | Erica Scarff | Canada | 1:15.55 | |
| 6 | Zhanyl Baltabayeva | Kazakhstan | 1:15.55 | |
| 7 | Larisa Volik | RCF | 1:15.55 | |

=== Final ===
Competitors raced for positions 1 to 9, with medals going to the top three.

| Rank | Name | Country | Time |
|---|---|---|---|
| 1st place, gold medalist(s) | Laura Sugar | Great Britain | 47.77 |
| 2nd place, silver medalist(s) | Hope Gordon | Great Britain | 48.25 |
| 3rd place, bronze medalist(s) | Nélia Barbosa | France | 48.78 |
| 4 | Felicia Laberer | Germany | 49.82 |
| 5 | Katarzyna Kozikowska | Poland | 49.86 |
| 6 | Mari Christina Santilli | Brazil | 50.59 |
| 7 | Nikoletta Molnár | Hungary | 50.97 |
| 8 | Amanda Embriaco | Italy | 51.45 |
| 9 | Helene Ripa | Sweden | 52.08 |
