= 2018 ICF Canoe Sprint World Championships – Women's KL3 =

Women's KL3 at the 2018 ICF Canoe Sprint World Championships
- Venue: Centro de Alto Rendimento de Montemor-o-Velho
- Location: Montemor-o-Velho, Portugal
- Dates: 22–23 August
- Competitors: 15 from 13 nations
- Winning time: 53.671

Medalists
gold medal	Helene Ripa	Sweden
silver medal	Amanda Reynolds	Australia
bronze medal	Mihaela Lulea	Romania

The women's KL3 competition at the 2018 ICF Canoe Sprint World Championships in Montemor-o-Velho took place at the Centro de Alto Rendimento de Montemor-o-Velho.

== Schedule ==
The schedule was as follows:

Date	Time	Round
Wednesday 22 August 2018	15:25	Heats
Wednesday 22 August 2018	16:45	Semifinal
Thursday 23 August 2018	16:56	Final

All times are Western European Summer Time (UTC+1)

== Results ==
=== Heats ===
The fastest three boats in each heat advanced directly to the final. The next four fastest boats in each heat, plus the fastest remaining boat advanced to the semifinal.

==== Heat 1 ====
Rank	Name	Country	Time	Notes
1	Helene Ripa	Sweden	55.140	QF
2	Amanda Reynolds	Australia	55.740	QF
3	Shahla Behrouzirad	Iran	56.265	QF
4	Katarzyna Sobczak	Poland	58.100	QS
5	Chelsey Dixon	Great Britain	59.705	QS
6	Yoshimi Kaji	Japan	1:04.596	QS
7	Pan Xingzhu	China	1:07.891	QS
8	Jillian Elwart	United States	1:08.971	qS

==== Heat 2 ====
Rank	Name	Country	Time	Notes
1	Mihaela Lulea	Romania	57.976	QF
2	Mari Christina Santilli	Brazil	58.211	QF
3	Cai Yuqingyan	China	58.821	QF
4	Kelly Allen	United States	1:00.571	QS
5	Erica Scarff	Canada	1:00.831	QS
6	Larisa Volik	Russia	1:03.156	QS
7	Inés Felipe	Spain	1:09.761	QS

=== Semifinal ===
The fastest three boats advanced to the final.

Rank	Name	Country	Time	Notes
1	Katarzyna Sobczak	Poland	56.639	QF
2	Erica Scarff	Canada	58.454	QF
3	Chelsey Dixon	Great Britain	58.529	QF
4	Kelly Allen	United States	58.559	
5	Larisa Volik	Russia	58.644	
6	Yoshimi Kaji	Japan	1:02.719	
7	Pan Xingzhu	China	1:03.734	
8	Jillian Elwart	United States	1:06.984	
9	Inés Felipe	Spain	1:07.179	

=== Final ===
Competitors raced for positions 1 to 9, with medals going to the top three.

Rank	Name	Country	Time
1st place, gold medalist(s)	Helene Ripa	Sweden	53.671
2nd place, silver medalist(s)	Amanda Reynolds	Australia	53.881
3rd place, bronze medalist(s)	Mihaela Lulea	Romania	54.826
4	Mari Christina Santilli	Brazil	56.606
5	Cai Yuqingyan	China	57.151
6	Katarzyna Sobczak	Poland	57.746
7	Erica Scarff	Canada	57.786
8	Shahla Behrouzirad	Iran	57.936
9	Chelsey Dixon	Great Britain	59.911
