= 2024 ICF Paracanoe World Championships – Women's KL3 =

Women's KL3 at the 2024 ICF Paracanoe World Championships
- Venue: Olympic Centre of Szeged
- Location: Szeged, Hungary
- Dates: 10–11 May
- Competitors: 19 from 14 nations
- Winning time: 45.97

Medalists
gold medal	Laura Sugar	Great Britain
silver medal	Hope Gordon	Great Britain
bronze medal	Nélia Barbosa	France

The women's KL3 competition at the 2024 ICF Paracanoe World Championships in Szeged took place at the Olympic Centre of Szeged.

== Schedule ==
The schedule was as follows:

Date	Time	Round
Friday 10 May 2024	16:53	Heats
Saturday 11 May 2024	9:10	Semifinals
Saturday 11 May 2024	13:46	Final B
Saturday 11 May 2024	15:17	Final A

All times are Central European Summer Time (UTC+2)

== Results ==
=== Heats ===
Heat winners advanced directly to the A final.
The next six fastest boats in each heat advanced to the semifinals.

==== Heat 1 ====
Rank	Name	Country	Time	Notes
1	Laura Sugar	Great Britain	47.51	QA
2	Araceli Menduiña	Spain	49.36	QS
3	Katarzyna Kozikowska	Poland	49.65	QS
4	Cai Yuqingyan	China	53.25	QS
5	Kaia Scholl	Australia	1:00.29	QS
6	Shabana	India	1:04.05	QS

==== Heat 2 ====
Rank	Name	Country	Time	Notes
1	Nélia Barbosa	France	48.72	QA
2	Shakhnoza Mirzaeva	Uzbekistan	53.02	QS
3	Nikoletta Molnár	Hungary	53.71	QS
4	Aline Furtado de Oliveira	Brazil	55.44	QS
5	Kathleen O'Kelly-Kennedy	Australia	55.69	QS
6	Francisca Castro	Spain	57.87	QS
7	Wang Shanshan	China	58.67	QS

==== Heat 3 ====
Rank	Name	Country	Time	Notes
1	Hope Gordon	Great Britain	48.46	QA
2	Felicia Laberer	Germany	48.85	QS
3	Amanda Embriaco	Italy	50.77	QS
4	Shahla Behrouzirad	Iran	51.90	QS
5	Yoshimi Kaji	Japan	54.06	QS
6	Amy Ralph	Australia	58.14	QS

=== Semifinals ===
The fastest three boats in each semi advanced to the A final.
The next four fastest boats in each semi, plus the fastest remaining boat advanced to the B final.

==== Semifinal 1 ====
Rank	Name	Country	Time	Notes
1	Araceli Menduiña	Spain	48.09	QA
2	Amanda Embriaco	Italy	49.39	QA
3	Shahla Behrouzirad	Iran	50.96	QA
4	Cai Yuqingyan	China	51.43	QB
5	Nikoletta Molnár	Hungary	51.66	QB
6	Kathleen O'Kelly-Kennedy	Australia	54.34	QB
7	Wang Shanshan	China	55.48	QB
8	Amy Ralph	Australia	57.16	qB
9	Shabana	India	1:03.49	

==== Semifinal 2 ====
Rank	Name	Country	Time	Notes
1	Katarzyna Kozikowska	Poland	48.61	QA
2	Felicia Laberer	Germany	48.62	QA
3	Shakhnoza Mirzaeva	Uzbekistan	50.66	QA
4	Aline Furtado de Oliveira	Brazil	52.69	QB
5	Yoshimi Kaji	Japan	53.46	QB
6	Francisca Castro	Spain	54.19	QB
7	Kaia Scholl	Australia	57.72	QB

=== Finals ===
==== Final B ====
Competitors raced for positions 10 to 18.

Rank	Name	Country	Time
1	Cai Yuqingyan	China	50.81
2	Aline Furtado de Oliveira	Brazil	51.61
3	Nikoletta Molnár	Hungary	52.20
4	Yoshimi Kaji	Japan	52.28
5	Kathleen O'Kelly-Kennedy	Australia	53.27
6	Francisca Castro	Spain	53.45
7	Wang Shanshan	China	54.18
8	Amy Ralph	Australia	55.89
9	Kaia Scholl	Australia	57.17

==== Final A ====
Competitors raced for positions 1 to 9, with medals going to the top three.

Rank	Name	Country	Time
1st place, gold medalist(s)	Laura Sugar	Great Britain	45.97
2nd place, silver medalist(s)	Hope Gordon	Great Britain	46.94
3rd place, bronze medalist(s)	Nélia Barbosa	France	47.15
4	Araceli Menduiña	Spain	47.56
5	Felicia Laberer	Germany	47.94
6	Katarzyna Kozikowska	Poland	49.06
7	Amanda Embriaco	Italy	49.51
8	Shahla Behrouzirad	Iran	50.35
9	Shakhnoza Mirzaeva	Uzbekistan	51.36
