= 2023 ICF Canoe Sprint World Championships – Women's KL3 =

Women's KL3 at the 2023 ICF Canoe Sprint World Championships
- Venue: Sportpark Duisburg
- Location: Duisburg, Germany
- Dates: 24–27 August
- Competitors: 17 from 14 nations
- Winning time: 45.418

Medalists
gold medal	Laura Sugar	Great Britain
silver medal	Nélia Barbosa	France
bronze medal	Felicia Laberer	Germany

The women's KL3 competition at the 2023 ICF Canoe Sprint World Championships in Duisburg took place at Sportpark Duisburg.

== Schedule ==
The schedule was as follows:

Date	Time	Round
Thursday 24 August 2023	11:55	Heats
Saturday 26 August 2023	16:50	Semifinal
Sunday 27 August 2023	11:20	Final

All times are Central European Summer Time (UTC+2)

== Results ==
=== Heats ===
The fastest three boats in each heat advanced directly to the final.
The next four fastest boats in each heat, plus the fastest remaining boat advanced to the semifinal.

==== Heat 1 ====
Rank	Name	Country	Time	Notes
1	Laura Sugar	Great Britain	45.401	QF
2	Felicia Laberer	Germany	47.651	QF
3	Araceli Menduina	Spain	47.792	QF
4	Shakhnoza Mirzaeva	Uzbekistan	48.795	QS
5	Nikoletta Molnár	Hungary	49.120	QS
6	Shahla Behrouzirad	Iran	50.746	QS
7	Kathleen O'Kelly-Kennedy	Australia	50.832	QS
8	Aline Furtado de Oliveira	Brazil	52.330	qS
9	Sangeeta Rajput	India	1:03.513	

==== Heat 2 ====
Rank	Name	Country	Time	Notes
1	Nélia Barbosa	France	46.781	QF
2	Hope Gordon	Great Britain	48.274	QF
3	Katarzyna Kozikowska	Poland	48.642	QF
4	Amanda Embriaco	Italy	49.767	QS
5	Mari Christina Santilli	Brazil	51.018	QS
6	Cai Yuqingyan	China	52.896	QS
7	Yoshimi Kaji	Japan	53.938	QS
8	Shabana	India	1:02.712	

=== Semifinal ===
The fastest three boats advanced to the final.

Rank	Name	Country	Time	Notes
1	Shakhnoza Mirzaeva	Uzbekistan	49.423	QF
2	Nikoletta Molnár	Hungary	49.877	QF
3	Amanda Embriaco	Italy	49.898	QF
4	Shahla Behrouzirad	Iran	50.581	
5	Kathleen O'Kelly-Kennedy	Australia	51.983	
6	Mari Christina Santilli	Brazil	52.548	
7	Cai Yuqingyan	China	52.923	
8	Aline Furtado de Oliveira	Brazil	54.724	
9	Yoshimi Kaji	Japan	54.930	

=== Final ===
Competitors raced for positions 1 to 9, with medals going to the top three.

Rank	Name	Country	Time
1st place, gold medalist(s)	Laura Sugar	Great Britain	45.418
2nd place, silver medalist(s)	Nélia Barbosa	France	47.028
3rd place, bronze medalist(s)	Felicia Laberer	Germany	47.190
4	Hope Gordon	Great Britain	48.639
5	Nikoletta Molnár	Hungary	48.673
6	Araceli Menduina	Spain	48.692
7	Katarzyna Kozikowska	Poland	48.953
8	Shakhnoza Mirzaeva	Uzbekistan	49.752
9	Amanda Embriaco	Italy	50.415
