= Canoe at the 2020 Summer Paralympics – Women's KL3 =

Women's KL3 at the XVI Paralympic Games
- Venue: Sea Forest Waterway
- Dates: 2–4 September 2021
- Competitors: 10 from 10 nations

Medalists
1st place, gold medalist(s)		Laura Sugar	Great Britain
2nd place, silver medalist(s)		Nélia Barbosa	France
3rd place, bronze medalist(s)		Felicia Laberer	Germany

The Canoe Sprint women's KL3 event at the 2020 Paralympic Games took place on 2 and 4 September 2021. Two initial heats were held. Winners advanced directly to the final. The rest went into the semifinal, where the top six also advanced to the final.

== Schedule ==
Date	Time	Round
Thursday, 2 September 2021	11:20	Heats
Saturday, 4 September 2021	10:12	Semifinal
Saturday, 4 September 2021	11:31	Final A

== Results ==
=== Heats ===
Heat 1

Rank	Lane	Name	Nationality	Time	Notes
1	5	Laura Sugar	Great Britain	50.347	FA, PB
2	6	Helene Ripa	Sweden	53.005	SF
3	3	Felicia Laberer	Germany	53.022	SF
4	4	Shahla Behrouzirad	Iran	54.755	SF
5	2	Amanda Jennings	Australia	55.961	SF

Heat 2

Rank	Lane	Name	Nationality	Time	Notes
1	5	Nélia Barbosa	France	52.234	FA
2	4	Katarzyna Kozikowska	Poland	53.019	SF
3	2	Shakhnoza Mirzaeva	Uzbekistan	53.521	SF
4	6	Mari Christina Santilli	Brazil	54.340	SF
5	3	Yoshimi Kaji	Japan	55.777	SF

=== Semifinal ===
Rank	Lane	Name	Nationality	Time	Notes
1	3	Felicia Laberer	Germany	51.049	FA
2	5	Helene Ripa	Sweden	51.220	FA
3	7	Shahla Behrouzirad	Iran	51.316	FA
4	4	Katarzyna Kozikowska	Poland	51.333	FA
5	6	Shakhnoza Mirzaeva	Uzbekistan	51.466	FA
6	2	Mari Christina Santilli	Brazil	52.172	FA
7	8	Yoshimi Kaji	Japan	52.948	
8	1	Amanda Jennings	Australia	53.373	

=== Final A ===
Rank	Lane	Name	Nationality	Time	Notes
1st place, gold medalist(s)	5	Laura Sugar	Great Britain	49.582	PB
2nd place, silver medalist(s)	4	Nélia Barbosa	France	51.558	
3rd place, bronze medalist(s)	6	Felicia Laberer	Germany	51.868	
4	2	Katarzyna Kozikowska	Poland	52.264	
5	3	Helene Ripa	Sweden	52.307	
6	8	Shakhnoza Mirzaeva	Uzbekistan	52.398	
7	7	Shahla Behrouzirad	Iran	52.789	
8	1	Mari Christina Santilli	Brazil	54.093	
