= Kelda =

Kelda may refer to:

- Kelda Group, a British utilities company
- Kelda Holmes, a British actress
- Kelda Roys, Wisconsin politician
- Kelda Wood, British adaptive rower and canoeist
- A queen of a tribe of Nac Mac Feegle, a fictional race featured in Terry Pratchett's Discworld novels.
- Kelda (comics), a fictional character in the Marvel Comics comic book, Thor.
