= 2022 ICF Canoe Sprint World Championships – Women's KL3 =

Women's KL3 at the 2022 ICF Canoe Sprint World Championships
- Venue: Lake Banook
- Location: Dartmouth, Canada
- Dates: 4–6 August
- Competitors: 15 from 12 nations
- Winning time: 46.48

Medalists
gold medal	Laura Sugar	Great Britain
silver medal	Nélia Barbosa	France
bronze medal	Felicia Laberer	Germany

The women's KL3 competition at the 2022 ICF Canoe Sprint World Championships in Dartmouth took place on Lake Banook.

== Schedule ==
The schedule was as follows:

Date	Time	Round
Thursday 4 August 2022	10:35	Heats
Thursday 4 August 2022	16:10	Semifinal
Saturday 6 August 2022	10:52	Final

All times are Atlantic Daylight Time (UTC−3)

== Results ==
=== Heats ===
The fastest three boats in each heat advanced directly to the final.
The next four fastest boats in each heat, plus the fastest remaining boat advanced to the semifinal.

==== Heat 1 ====
Rank	Canoeist	Country	Time	Notes
1	Laura Sugar	Great Britain	49.48	QF
2	Felicia Laberer	Germany	50.24	QF
3	Shakhnoza Mirzaeva	Uzbekistan	51.87	QF
4	Mari Santilli	Brazil	53.63	QS
5	Kathleen O'Kelly-Kennedy	Australia	54.25	QS
6	Erica Scarff	Canada	56.37	QS
7	Jillian Elwart	United States	58.28	QS
8	Ayomide Ehinmore	Nigeria	1:00.97	qS

==== Heat 2 ====
Rank	Canoeist	Country	Time	Notes
1	Nélia Barbosa	France	49.60	QF
2	Hope Gordon	Great Britain	50.94	QF
3	Amanda Embriaco	Italy	52.40	QF
4	Nikoletta Molnár	Hungary	54.30	QS
5	Yoshimi Kaji	Japan	55.32	QS
6	Bosede Omoboni	Nigeria	1:00.55	QS
7	Melissa DeChellis	United States	1:13.43	QS

=== Semifinal ===
The fastest three boats advanced to the final.

Rank	Canoeist	Country	Time	Notes
1	Mari Santilli	Brazil	55.11	QF
2	Nikoletta Molnár	Hungary	55.63	QF
3	Kathleen O'Kelly-Kennedy	Australia	55.68	QF
4	Yoshimi Kaji	Japan	55.70	
5	Erica Scarff	Canada	57.81	
6	Bosede Omoboni	Nigeria	1:01.01	
7	Jillian Elwart	United States	1:01.31	
8	Ayomide Ehinmore	Nigeria	1:03.15	
9	Melissa DeChellis	United States	1:16.00	

=== Final ===
Competitors raced for positions 1 to 9, with medals going to the top three.

Rank	Name	Country	Time
1st place, gold medalist(s)	Laura Sugar	Great Britain	46.48
2nd place, silver medalist(s)	Nélia Barbosa	France	46.84
3rd place, bronze medalist(s)	Felicia Laberer	Germany	46.93
4	Hope Gordon	Great Britain	47.53
5	Shakhnoza Mirzaeva	Uzbekistan	48.29
6	Amanda Embriaco	Italy	49.35
7	Nikoletta Molnár	Hungary	49.83
8	Mari Santilli	Brazil	50.41
9	Kathleen O'Kelly-Kennedy	Australia	51.10
