= Brandon Holiday =

American para-athlete (1972–2026)

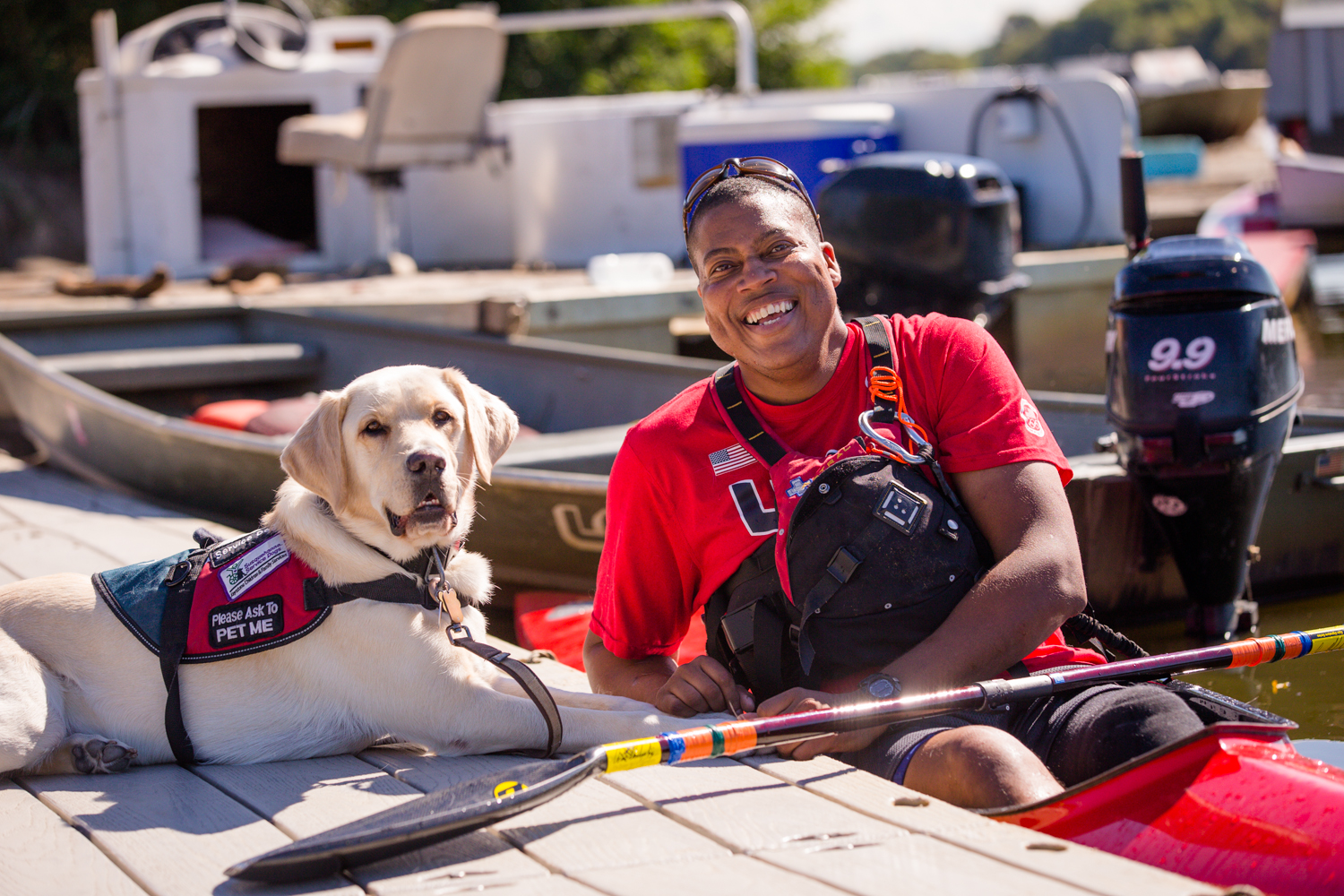
Holiday with his service dog Dyson training at Cooper River Park, located at Camden County Boathouse, Pennsauken, New Jersey

Brandon Holiday (January 25, 1972 – January 13, 2026) was a Paracanoe Sprint Kayaker from the United States.

While growing up in Maplewood, New Jersey, Holiday played various sports, such as tennis and baseball, and trained in martial arts. He grew up with Systemic Lupus, Primary Addison's and Antiphospholipid syndrome. After attending the University of Maryland Eastern Shore and Salisbury University, he became a police officer, but an injury in the line of duty and medical complications from his lupus forced him to leave the Salisbury Police Department.

In 2006, after four months in the hospital battling with blood clots, wound care and hyperbaric chamber treatments, doctors had to amputate his left leg below the knee. Ten months later, Holiday attended the Extremity Games, an extreme sports event for people with amputations and/or spinal cord injuries hosted by the Athletes with Disabilities Network. From 2007, he won a bronze medal in mixed martial arts, silver medal in recreational kayaking and five gold medals at the United States Sprint Canoe Kayak National Championships. He became 2014 and 2015 K1, Paracanoe men's 200m & 500m United States Paracanoe Sprint Kayak Champion and the 2014 Master's 35+ Able Bodied 500m Champion, beating out able-bodied contenders in his age group. Between 2015 and 2024, Holiday worked with other disabled community members and veterans through the Athletes with Disabilities Network Northeast Chapter.

In 2016 Holiday made the US National Paracanoe Team and traveled to Duisburg, Germany to compete at the 2016 ICF Paracanoe World Championships. World Championships in 2016 were the Paralympic qualifying competition for Paracanoe Athletes. He was unable to advance and qualify for the U.S., but his teammate Alana Nichols, Kelly Allen and Ann Yoshida qualified and competed at the 2016 Rio Paralympics.

On November 5, 2016, Holiday competed in the first ever amputee tennis tournament held at the Cherry Hill Racquet club. He also competed in 2008 at the Extremity Games in Michigan, winning a bronze medal in the Pancrase tournament. He was the executive director of Athletes with Disabilities Network Northeast, which is a non-profit that aims to promote a better quality of life for people with physical disabilities, especially for veterans and first responders by mentoring and creating awareness and offering opportunities for local athletic, recreational and educational activities. He created the Northeast Chapter to create a mentoring outreach program and adaptive sports program, which assists disabled community members heal with the help of paired mentors and use sport as a catalyst to healing.

In 2013, Holiday adopted Dyson, a Labrador Retriever, as a service dog. He credited Dyson with saving his life in December 2016 during an adrenal crisis. Holiday awoke in the middle of the night with a high fever, but did not have his phone with him to call for help. Dyson retrieved Holiday's phone for him, which Holiday used to call 911. In 2021, Dyson won the AKC Humane Fund Awards for Canine Excellence in the service dog category.

On January 13, 2026, Holiday died aged 53, his obituary saying he "completed his journey." He is survived by his partner, mother, and family.
