= Anne Dickins =

British Para canoeist (born 1967)

Anne Dickins MBE
Personal information
- Born: 20 February 1967 (age 59) Glasgow, Scotland
- Home town: Oxted, Surrey, England
- Height: 1.72 m (5 ft 8 in)
- Weight: 69 kg (152 lb)

Sport
- Country: Great Britain
- Sport: Para canoe
- Disability class: KL3
Medal record
Women's Para canoe
Representing Great Britain
Paralympic Games
Gold medal – first place	2016 Rio	KL3
World Championships
Gold medal – first place	2014 Moscow	K-1 LTA
Gold medal – first place	2016 Duisburg	KL3
Silver medal – second place	2013 Duisburg	K-1 LTA
Silver medal – second place	2015 Milan	KL3

Anne Dickins (born 20 February 1967) is a British Para canoeist who competes in the KL3 classification. She won gold in this event at the 2016 Summer Paralympics, and has also won two World Championship and three European Championship golds.

== Background ==
Dickins was born in Glasgow, Scotland and lives in Oxted, Surrey. She is a physiotherapist by profession. She competed as an endurance mountain biker until she ruptured a disc in her back in 2011, which led to her developing cauda equina syndrome resulting in permanent nerve damage in her right leg.

Dickins was a volunteer Games Maker at the 2012 Summer Olympics in London, where she met Colin Radmore, a canoeing coach who invited her to try out for the Great Britain paracanoeing team. She had to overcome seasickness when she took up the sport, and underwent a desensitisation programme similar to those used by fighter pilots.

== Career ==
In her first year of competition, Dickins won gold at the 2013 European Championships and silver at the World Championships in the K-1 200m LTA class. In 2014 she successfully defended her European Championship title and won her first World Championship gold. In 2015 she won a third successive European Championship title and won the silver medal in the World Championships, competing in the K-1 200m KL3 class. (Note: The International Canoe Federation reclassified the LTA category as the KL3 category from 2015 onwards.) At the 2016 World Championships she won gold in the K-1 200m KL3 class.

Dickins won gold in the KL3 class at the 2016 Summer Paralympics in Rio de Janeiro, the first Paralympics to feature canoeing events, beating Amanda Reynolds by a margin of 0.03 seconds.

Dickins was appointed Member of the Order of the British Empire (MBE) in the 2017 New Year Honours for services to canoeing.
