= Laura Sugar =

British Paralympic athlete

Laura Sugar MBE
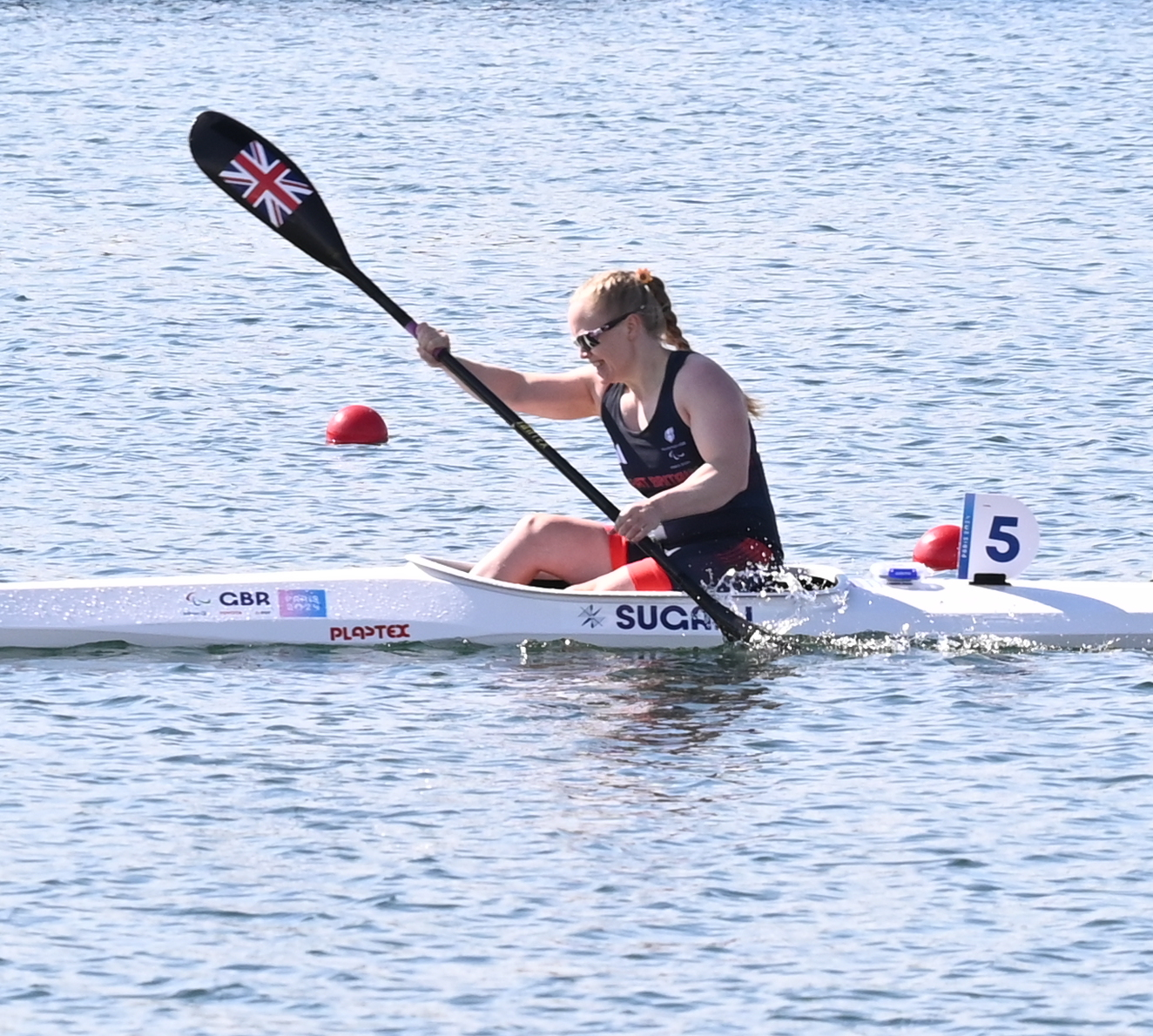
- Sugar at the 2024 Summer Paralympics

Personal information
- Nationality: British
- Born: 7 February 1991 (age 35) Saffron Walden, England

Sport
- Country: Great Britain
- Sport: Paracanoe; Track and field
- Disability: congenital
- Disability class: KL3 (paracanoeing); T44 (athletics)
- Events: WKL3 (paracanoe); 100m (track); 200m long jump
- Club: Birchfield Harriers
- Coached by: Femi Akinsaya (club); Paula Dunn (national)

Achievements and titles
- Paralympic finals: Tokyo 2020 (gold)
- Personal bests: 100m – 13.55s 200m – 28.29s Long jump – 4.48m
Medal record
Representing Great Britain
Women's Para canoe
Paralympic Games
Gold medal – first place	2020 Tokyo	KL3
Gold medal – first place	2024 Paris	KL3
World Championships
Gold medal – first place	2021 Copenhagen	KL3
Gold medal – first place	2022 Dartmouth	KL3
Gold medal – first place	2023 Duisburg	KL3
Gold medal – first place	2024 Szeged	KL3
Gold medal – first place	2025 MIlan	KL3
Silver medal – second place	2019 Szeged	KL3
European Championships
Gold medal – first place	2022 Munich	KL3
Gold medal – first place	2025 Racice	KL3
Bronze medal – third place	2019 Poznań	KL3
Women's Para athletics
European Championships
Silver medal – second place	2016 Grosseto	100 m T44
Bronze medal – third place	2014 Swansea	100 m T44
Bronze medal – third place	2014 Swansea	200 m T44
Bronze medal – third place	2016 Grosseto	200 m T44

Laura Sugar (born 7 February 1991) is a British Para athlete and Para canoeist who is a two time Paralympic champion in the Para canoe KL3 event . Prior to competing in Para canoe, Sugar competed in Para athletics in the sprint events under the T44 classification. Before taking up athletics, Sugar represented Wales at field hockey captaining the under-20s team and gaining 16 full international caps.

== Personal career ==
Sugar was born in Saffron Walden, England in 1991. She was born with talipes (club foot), which meant her foot was turned in. Sugar underwent surgery to correct the problem as a baby, but it left her with no movement in her ankle. She was educated at Newport Free Grammar before matriculating to the University of Leeds where she studied sports science. She followed this with a Postgraduate Certificate in Education to qualify as a secondary school teacher. She took up a position at Ashby School as a PE teacher, but left her position in 2015 to focus on her athletics training.

== Canoeing career ==
Sugar switched to paracanoeing from athletics at the end of 2018 thanks UK Sports talent transfer programme. At her first world championships in 2019 Sugar won the silver behind Shahnova Mirzaeva of Uzbekistan missing out on the gold by 0.03 of a second. Due to Covid the 2020 Canoe world championships was cancelled meaning that Sugars next major event would be the Tokyo 2020 Paralympic games. Sugar became Paralympic champion in Tokyo in 2021 just three years after joining the World Class Programme. Sugar went on to claim her maiden world title just two weeks later in Copenhagen, before being awarded an MBE in the 2022 New Year’s Honours. She has since gone on to underline her dominance in the KL3 event, powering to victory at the World Championships in Halifax and European Championship in Munich in 2022. The latter was her first European title after a bronze in 2019. In 2023, Sugar won her third consecutive world title in the KL3 in Duisburg, while also qualifying Britain’s boat quota spot for Paris 2024. Sugar continued on her success from 2023 in 2024 winning a fourth World Championship gold in Szeged. Sugar retained her Paralympic title winning gold at Paris 2024 in the Women’s Kayak Single 200m KL3 race. This was ParalympicsGB’s 49th and final gold medal of a stunning Paris 2024 Paralympic Games.

== Hockey career ==
Sugar took up field hockey while attending Newport Free Grammar, starting at the age of 12. She played as a youth for Saffron Walden, Cambridgeshire and was selected for trials for the East of England squad. This brought her to the attention of Hockey Wales who successfully recruited her to the Welsh youth squad due to her father's Welsh roots. She first played for Wales at the age of 17, and progressed through the age groups until she reached the senior levels. Sugar described captaining the Wales under-20s which as "one of my proudest moments through hockey". Sugar went on to gain 16 caps for the wales senior team before moving to Para athletics.

== Athletics career ==
During her hockey training the team's physio commented on Sugar's ankle impairment, stating that she should try out a Paralympic sport as she would be able to gain a classification. While watching the 2012 Summer Paralympics she noticed that the British discus thrower, Dan Greaves appeared to have "the same leg", and Sugar decided to explore her physio's advice. She attended a Paralympic sport's festival in Surrey and after considering cycling and athletics she decided to follow the latter. In February 2013 she had her first athletics trial and was informed that she would be flown out to Dubai in four weeks to be classified before competing at the Fazaa International, an IPC Grand Prix event. At the Grand Prix she ran in the 100m and 200m sprints, winning a silver and gold medal. Now a T44 classification athlete, Sugar had to decide on whether to continue her hockey career or switch to track and field. She chose athletics and spent the next ten months committing all her time outside of her teaching to her new training regime.

Sugar's first major international competition came in July 2013 when she was selected as part of the Great Britain team to compete at the 2013 IPC Athletics World Championships in Lyon. In the Women's 100m (T44) she came through the heats to finish fifth in the finals. In the 200m she finished fourth, just outside a podium finish. The following year she won her first international medals, collecting two bronze medals at the 2014 IPC Athletics European Championships in Swansea, in the 100m and 200m sprints. During 2014 and 2015 Sugar also entered long jump events. Her most notable result being at the European Championships in Swansea where she came fourth with a distance of 4.27 metres.

In the build-up to the 2016 Summer Paralympics in Rio, Sugar travelled to Doha to compete at her second World Championships. She was selected by the Great Britain management to co-captain the team, along with middle-distance runner Paul Blake. Sugar only competed in the 100 metres event, and her time of 14.86, way outside her personal best, was not enough to get her through the heats. The following year brought a return to success with two medals at the 2016 IPC Athletics European Championships in Grosseto. She won a bronze in the 200m and a silver in the 200m, just a tenth of a second behind the winner Irmgard Bensusan of Germany. In July Sugar was confirmed as a member of the Great Britain team to compete at the Rio Paralympics.

Sugar was appointed Member of the Order of the British Empire (MBE) in the 2022 New Year Honours for services to canoeing.
