= 2025 ICF Canoe Sprint World Championships – Women's KL3 =

Women's KL3 200 metres at the 2025 ICF Canoe Sprint World Championships
- Venue: Idroscalo Regatta Course
- Location: Milan, Italy
- Dates: 20–23 August
- Competitors: 15 from 13 nations
- Winning time: 46.15

Medalists
gold medal	Laura Sugar	Great Britain
silver medal	Nélia Barbosa	France
bronze medal	Hope Gordon	Great Britain
bronze medal	Felicia Laberer	Germany

The women's KL3 competition at the 2025 ICF Canoe Sprint World Championships in Milan took place in Idroscalo Regatta Course.

== Schedule ==
The schedule is as follows:

Date	Time	Round
Wednesday 20 August 2025	15:28	Heats
Friday 22 August 2025	09:30	Semifinal
Saturday 23 August 2025	15:24	Final A

== Results ==
=== Heats ===
The fastest three boats in each heat advanced directly to the final.
The next four fastest boats in each heat, plus the fastest remaining boat advanced to the semifinal

==== Heat 1 ====
Rank	Canoeist	Country	Time	Notes
1	Laura Sugar	Great Britain	45.94	FA
2	Araceli Menduiña	Spain	48.00	FA
3	Felicia Laberer	Germany	48.15	FA
4	Shakhnoza Mirzaeva	Uzbekistan	49.24	QS
5	Nikoletta Molnár	Hungary	51.02	QS
6	Cai Yuqingyan	China	51.45	QS
7	Patchisa Mora	Thailand	1:01.48	QS
	Mushka Cohen	Israel	DNF	

==== Heat 2 ====
Rank	Canoeist	Country	Time	Notes
1	Nélia Barbosa	France	47.10	FA
2	Hope Gordon	Great Britain	47.46	FA
3	María Jiménez	Spain	48.18	FA
4	Katarzyna Kozikowska	Poland	48.44	QS
5	Amanda Embriaco	Italy	50.04	QS
6	Aline Furtado de Oliveira	Brazil	52.59	QS
7	Amanda Munkeby	United States	1:14.37	QS

=== Semifinal ===
The fastest three boats iadvanced to the A final.

Rank	Canoeist	Country	Time	Notes
1	Katarzyna Kozikowska	Poland	49.37	FA
2	Shakhnoza Mirzaeva	Uzbekistan	50.10	FA
3	Amanda Embriaco	Italy	50.69	FA
4	Cai Yuqingyan	China	51.37	
5	Aline Furtado de Oliveira	Brazil	52.51	
6	Nikoletta Molnár	Hungary	52.54	
7	Patchisa Mora	Thailand	1:00.53	
8	Amanda Munkeby	United States	1:13.95	

=== Final ===
Competitors raced for positions 1 to 9, with medals going to the top three.

Rank	Canoeist	Country	Time	Notes
1st place, gold medalist(s)	Laura Sugar	Great Britain	46.15	
2nd place, silver medalist(s)	Nélia Barbosa	France	47.26	
3rd place, bronze medalist(s)	Hope Gordon	Great Britain	47.59	
3rd place, bronze medalist(s)	Felicia Laberer	Germany	47.59	
5	Araceli Menduiña	Spain	48.19	
6	Katarzyna Kozikowska	Poland	48.29	
7	María Jiménez	Spain	49.05	
8	Shakhnoza Mirzaeva	Uzbekistan	49.09	
9	Amanda Embriaco	Italy	49.73	
