= 2026 ICF Canoe Sprint World Championships – Women's KL3 =

Women's KL3 at the 2026 ICF Canoe Sprint World Championships
- Venue: Lake Malta
- Location: Poznań, Poland
- Dates: 26–29 August
- Winning time: 45.53

Medalists
gold medal	Hope Gordon	Great Britain
silver medal	Nélia Barbosa	France
bronze medal	Felicia Laberer	Germany

The women's KL3 competition at the 2026 ICF Canoe Sprint World Championships in Poznań took place at Lake Malta.

== Schedule ==
The schedule is as follows:

Date	Time	Round
Wednesday 26 August 2026	16:49	Heats
Friday 28 August 2026	09:30	Semifinals
Saturday 29 August 2026	13:50	Final B
Saturday 29 August 2026	15:54	Final A

=== Finals ===
Competitors raced for positions 1 to 9, with medals going to the top three.

Rank	Lane	Name	Nation	Time	Gap
1st place, gold medalist(s)	4	Hope Gordon	Great Britain	45.53	
2nd place, silver medalist(s)	6	Nélia Barbosa	France	45.65	+0.12
3rd place, bronze medalist(s)	5	Felicia Laberer	Germany	45.48	+0.95
4	7	Katarzyna Kozikowska	Poland	47.56	+2.03
5	2	Amanda Embriaco	Italy	47.88	+2.35
6	1	Nikoletta Molnár	Hungary	49.26	+3.73
7	8	Cai Yuqingyan	China	50.56	+5.03
8	9	Claudia Fischer	Germany	51.72	6.19
	3	Araceli Menduiña	Spain	DSQ	
