= Nélia Barbosa =

French Para canoeist (born 1998)

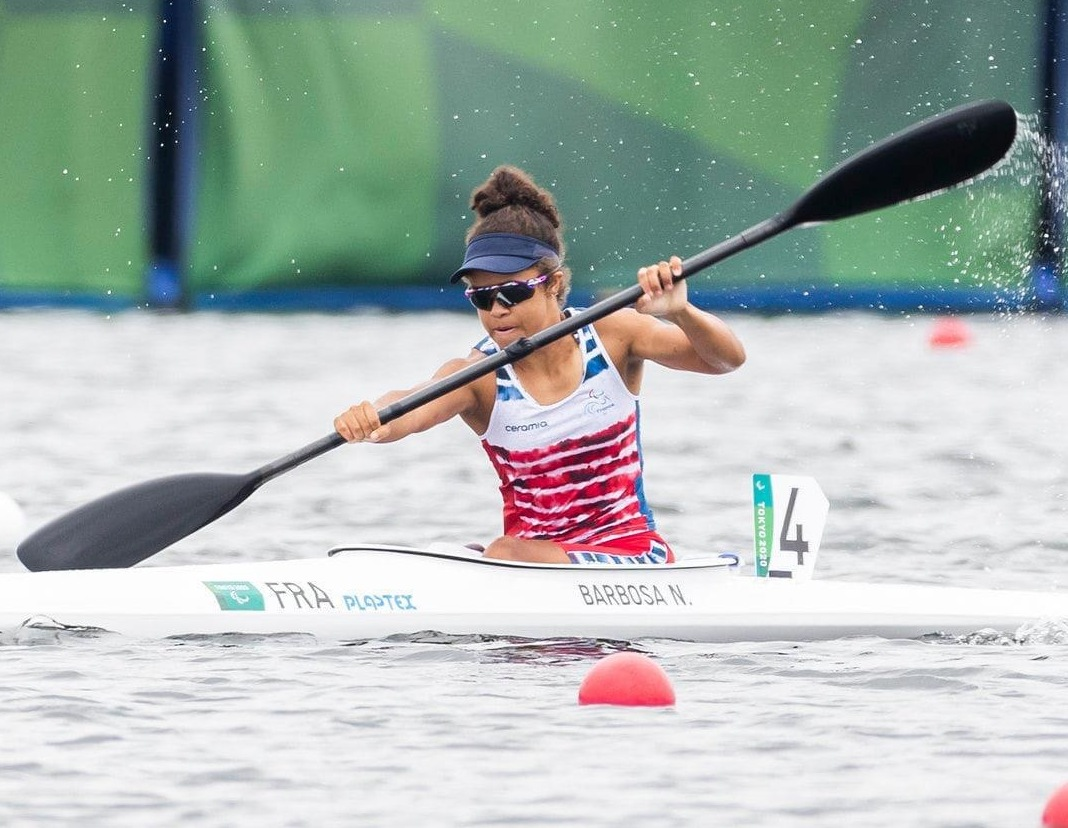
- Barbosa at the 2020 Summer Paralympics

Personal information
- Born: 8 October 1998 (age 27) Lisbon, Portugal

Sport
- Country: Portugal
- Sport: Para canoe
- Disability: Neurofibromatosis
- Disability class: KL3
- Club: Red Star Club
- Coached by: Eric Le Leuch; Benoit Chantry
Medal record
Women's Para canoe
Representing France
Event	1st	2nd	3rd
Paralympic Games	0	2	0
World Championships	0	4	2
European Championships	0	6	0
Total	0	12	2
Paralympic Games
Silver medal – second place	2020 Tokyo	KL3
Silver medal – second place	2024 Paris	KL3
World Championships
Silver medal – second place	2022 Dartmouth	KL3
Silver medal – second place	2023 Duisburg	KL3
Silver medal – second place	2025 MIlan	KL3
Silver medal – second place	2026 Poznán	KL3
Bronze medal – third place	2021 Copenhagen	KL3
Bronze medal – third place	2024 Szeged	KL3
European Championships
Silver medal – second place	2019 Poznań	KL3
Silver medal – second place	2021 Poznań	KL3
Silver medal – second place	2022 Munich	KL3
Silver medal – second place	2024 Szeged	KL3
Silver medal – second place	2025 Racice	KL3
Silver medal – second place	2026 Montemor-o-Velho	KL3

Nélia Barbosa (born 8 October 1998) is a French Para canoeist. She represented France at the 2020 and 2024 Summer Paralympics.

== Career ==
Barbosa represented France at the 2021 Canoe Sprint European Championships in the women's KL3 event and won a silver medal.

Barbosa represented France at the 2020 Summer Paralympics in the women's KL3 event and won a silver medal. She again represented France at the 2024 Summer Paralympics in the women's KL3 event and won a silver medal.
