= Mihaela Lulea =

Romanian paracanoeist

Personal information
- Full name: Mihaela Cristina Lulea
- Born: 5 September 1981 (age 44)

Sport
- Country: Romania
- Sport: Paracanoe
Medal record
Women's paracanoeing
Representing Romania
World Championships
Bronze medal – third place	2012 Poznań	KL3
Bronze medal – third place	2016 Duisburg	KL3
Bronze medal – third place	2017 Račice	KL3
Bronze medal – third place	2018 Montemor-o-Velho	KL3

Mihaela Cristina Lulea (born 5 September 1981) is a Romanian paracanoeist and former para table tennis player. She played table tennis nationally and competes in paracanoe events internationally.

Lulea lost her leg aged twelve when a bear grabbed her leg while she was leaning against the railings of the bear's enclosure at a zoo. Once she freed herself from the bear's grip, she went to pick up her jacket but slipped and the bear grabbed and pulled her in again. The bear seriously bitten her leg and her leg injury was so severe that doctors had to amputate her leg from the knee down.
