= AJ Jennings =

Australian Para canoeist (born 1971)

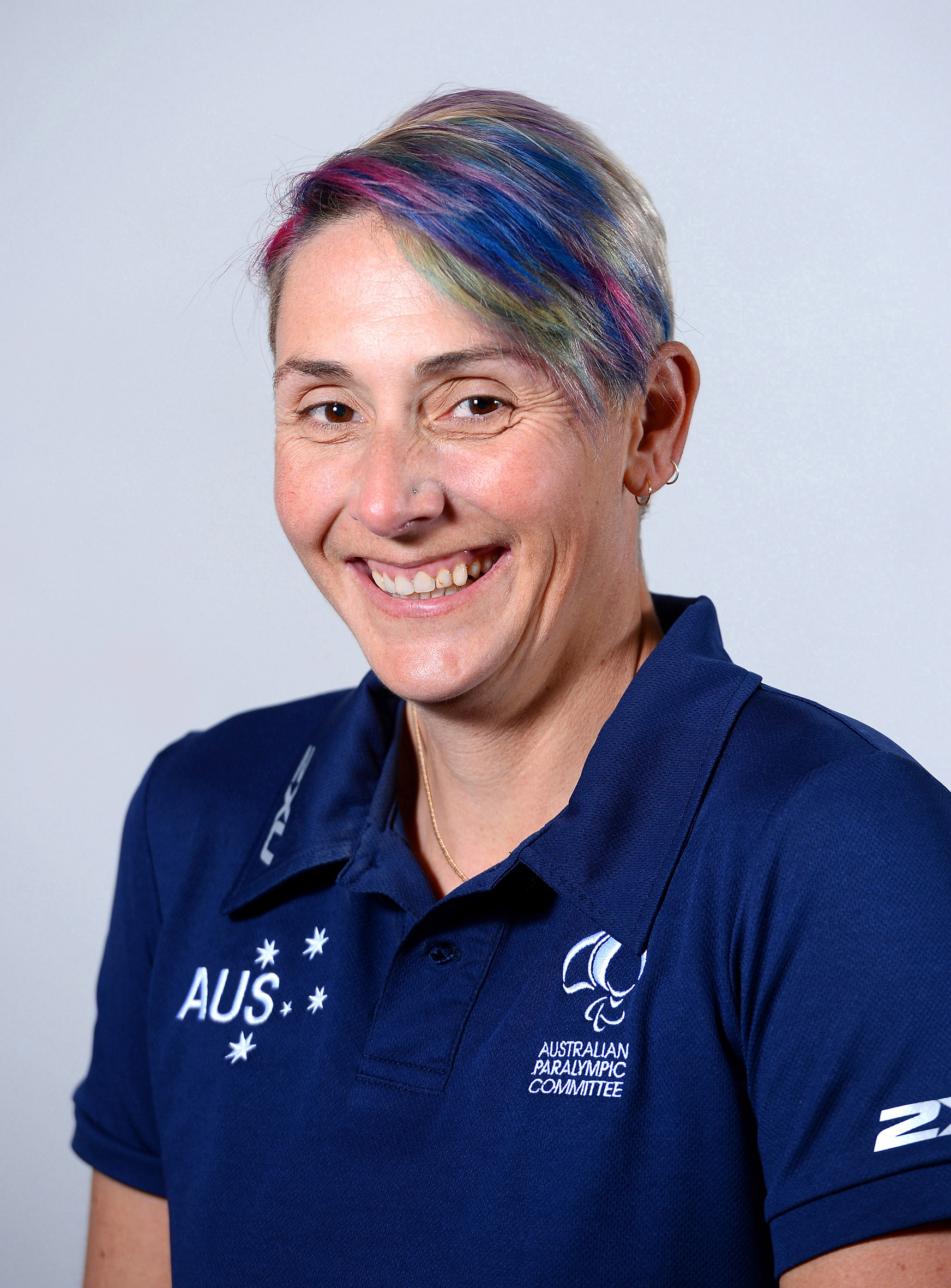
- 2016 Australian Paralympic team portrait

Personal information
- Full name: Amanda Jane Jennings
- Nationality: Australian
- Born: 7 October 1971 (age 55)

Sport
- Country: Australia
- Sport: Para canoe, Para archery
- Disability class: KL3 (Para canoe)
Medal record
Women's Para canoe
Representing Australia
Paralympic Games
Silver medal – second place	2016 Rio de Janeiro	KL3
World Championships
Gold medal – first place	2015 Milan	KL3
Gold medal – first place	2017 Račice	KL3
Silver medal – second place	2016 Duisburg	KL3
Silver medal – second place	2018 Montemor-o-Velho	KL3
Bronze medal – third place	2014 Moscow	K-1 LTA

Amanda Jane "AJ" Jennings (formerly Reynolds, born 7 October 1971) is an Australian Para canoeist and Para archer. She won two gold medals at the ICF Canoe Sprint World Championships and a silver medal in the Women's 200m KL3 at the 2016 Rio Paralympics.

She competed in archery at the 2024 Paris Paralympics.

== Personal ==
Jennings was born on 7 October 1971. In April 2012, Jennings underwent elective surgery to amputate the lower part of her right leg. For 20 years before the amputation, Jennings lived with depression, chronic pain and an addiction to prescriptive drugs following complications from a dislocated knee. In reflecting to life after the amputation, Jennings commented: "Everybody's got the opportunity. You've just got to have the courage to take it."

She is an Equine Sports Therapist. Jennings is married to Wayne and they have two children.

== Sporting career ==
=== Canoeing ===
Jennings is classified as KL3 paracanoeist. Reynolds paddling career started with the Murray Marathon and participated in the 2013 Sale to Sea Disability Kayak Challenge. In 2014, she won the K1 200 m, K1 500 m and 1000 m LTA events at the National and Oceania Championships. In her world championships debut, she won the bronze medal in the Women's K1 200 m LTA at the 2014 ICF Canoe Sprint World Championships in Moscow, Russia. At the 2015 ICF Canoe Sprint World Championships in Milan, Italy, she won the gold medal in the Women's K–1 200 m KL3.

At the 2016 ICF Paracanoe World Championships, Duisburg, Germany, she won the silver medal in the Women's 200 m KL3. A month prior to the championships, she underwent an appendix operation. She won a silver medal in the 200m KL3 at the 2016 Rio Paralympics where paracanoe made it Paralympics debut.

At the 2017 ICF Canoe Sprint World Championships, Račice, Czech Republic, she won the gold medal in Women's KL2 200m. After a year of battling injury, Reynolds at 2018 ICF Canoe Sprint World Championships, Montemor-o-Velho, won the silver medal in the Women's KL3 200m.

At the 2019 ICF Canoe Sprint World Championships, Szeged, Hungary, she finished seventh in the Women's KL3 200m.

At the 2020 Summer Paralympics, Jennings finished fifth in her Heat and eighth in the Women's KL3 semi-final and did not advance to the final.

Jennings held a Victorian Institute of Sport scholarship holder and was originally coached by Steve Vegh and Mark Dougall. In 2015, she moved to the Gold Coast, Queensland to work closer with National Para-canoe Head Coach Andrea King. She named her new sprint canoe "Douglas" or "Doug" after two people that have inspired her - boxer James 'buster' Douglas and pilot Douglas Bader.

=== Archery ===
Jennings transitioned to archery after the 2020 Summer Paralympics as a result of two hip replacements. She took up archery as part of her rehabilitation. She competes in recurve events. She member of Mount Petrie Bowman in Brisbane, Queensland.

At the 2024 Paris Paralympics, she lost in the round of sixteen in the Women's individual recurve open. She partnered with Taymon Kenton-Smith, in the Mixed team recurve where they lost in the round of sixteen.

== Recognition ==
In 2015 and 2016, she was awarded the People's Choice Award at the Australian Canoeing Awards.
