= Para canoe classification =

Disability sport classification system

Para canoe classification is the classification system for Para canoe. It consists of three categories KL1, KL2 and KL3. Para canoe will be included for the first time at the 2016 Rio Paralympics. The sport is governed by the International Canoe Federation.

== History ==
The Para canoe classification system was created by the International Paralympic Committee (IPC). In 2003, the IPC Athletics Classification Project developed an evidence-based classification system to assist with eligibility and sports class allocation. In April 2015, the International Canoe Federation released a new classification system ahead of the 2016 Rio Paralympics. Changes were made to rename different classes of Para canoeing. Current categories are included below. Para canoeing will be included for the first time at the Summer Paralympics in Rio 2016 as voted in by the IPC in 2010.

Formerly Known As	Currently Known As
A (Arms)	KL1
TA (Trunk and Arms)	KL2
LTA (Legs, Trunk and Arms)	KL3

== ICF classification ==
The ICF classifies paddlers into three classes according to their impairments.

KL1

KL1-class competitors have limited or no trunk function and no leg balance. They apply force predominantly using the arms and/or shoulders.

Eligible paddlers meet one of the following:

- Impaired range of motion
- Loss of muscle strength equivalent to spinal cord injury complete at T12 level.

KL2

KL2-class competitors have partial leg and trunk function alongside good arm strength. They may require a backrest and footboard to propel the canoe depending on their leg function.

Eligible paddlers meet one of the following:

- Limb loss of deficiency equivalent to double above leg amputation
- Significant muscle strength loss in both legs
- Impaired range of motion within lower limbs and trunk

KL3

KL3-class competitors have trunk function and partial leg function. They sit in a forward flexed position and use a footboard or the seat to help propel the boat.

Eligible paddlers meet one of the following:

- Limb loss deficiency equivalent to tarsal metatarsal amputation of foot
- Loss of muscle strength equivalent to incomplete spinal cord injury at S1
- Impaired range of motion: In lower limbs

=== Non-Paralympic Para canoe events ===
Para canoe athletes have an opportunity to compete at an international level. The classification system is the same but uses different names for categories: VL1, VL2 an VL3.

== At the Paralympic Games ==
For the 2016 Summer Paralympics in Rio, the International Paralympic Committee had a zero classification at the Games policy. This policy was put into place in 2014, with the goal of avoiding last minute changes in classes that would negatively impact athlete training preparations. All competitors needed to be internationally classified with their classification status confirmed prior to the Games, with exceptions to this policy being dealt with on a case-by-case basis. In case there was a need for classification or reclassification at the Games despite best efforts otherwise, Para canoe classification was scheduled for September 10 and September 11 at Lagoa Stadium. For sportspeople with physical or intellectual disabilities going through classification or reclassification in Rio, their in competition observation event is their first appearance in competition at the Games.^{[33]}
