= Cindy Moreau =

French Para canoeist (born 1983)

Personal information
- Born: 11 October 1983 (age 42) Angers, France
- Height: 163 cm (5 ft 4 in)
- Weight: 54 kg (119 lb)

Sport
- Country: France
- Sport: Para canoe
- Disability class: KL3
- Club: Club Nautique Bouchemaine
- Coached by: Francois Maucourant
Medal record
Women's Para canoe
Representing France
Paralympic Games
Bronze medal – third place	2016 Rio de Janeiro	KL3
World Championships
Silver medal – second place	2014 Moscow	K1
Bronze medal – third place	2013 Duisburg	K1
Bronze medal – third place	2015 Milan	KL3

Cindy Moreau (born 11 October 1983) is a French Para canoeist. She works as a civilian contract employee for the Ministry of Defence.
