= Kelda Wood =

British adaptive rower and canoeist

Kelda Wood MBE
- Citizenship: British
- Known for: Rowing; Paracanoe; Fundraising
- Website: website

Kelda Wood (born 1962/1963), is a British adaptive rower and canoeist. She represented Team GB in Paracanoe at the 2016 ICF Paracanoe World Championships. In 2019, she became the first solo adaptive athlete to complete the Talisker Whisky Atlantic Challenge. During the challenge, she had to repair her vessel's adapted footplate and claimed she was accompanied by a whale for two days. She completed the challenge in 76-days. Wood is the chief executive officer of the charity Climbing Out (which empowers life after trauma) and received an MBE in the 2021 New Year Honours for charitable services.

== Personal life ==
Kelda, who had been a keen point-to-point rider, was left disabled when a bale of hay fell on her left leg in 2002. She was diagnosed with breast cancer in 2020 on the day she was notified she had received her MBE. Her father, to whom she dedicated her honour on its announcement, had died 11 weeks previously. Kelda lives at Shrewsbury, Shropshire.
