= Kathleen O'Kelly-Kennedy =

Australian wheelchair basketball player (born 1986)

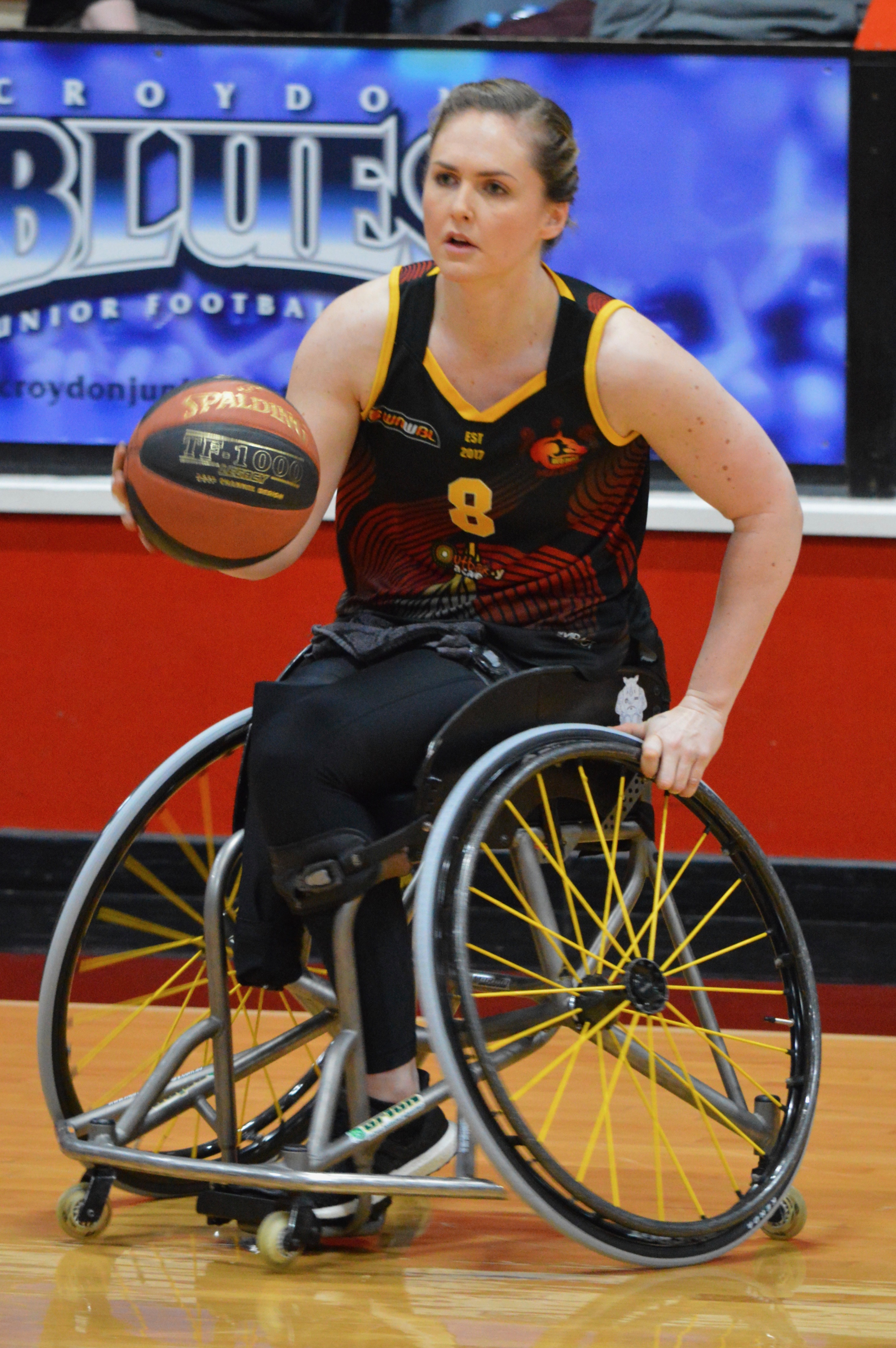
- O'Kelly-Kennedy at a Red Dust Heelers game in 2019

Personal information
- Nationality: Australia
- Born: 21 June 1986 (age 40)

Sport
- Sport: Wheelchair basketball
- Disability class: 4.0
- Event: Women's team
- College team: University of Illinois
- Club: Stacks Goudkamp Bears; Red Dust Heelers

Achievements and titles
- National finals: University of Illinois 2005–06, 2006–07, 2007–08
Medal record
Wheelchair basketball
Paralympic Games
Bronze medal – third place	2008 Beijing	Women's wheelchair basketball

Kathleen O'Kelly-Kennedy (born 21 June 1986) is an Australian 4.0 point wheelchair basketball player who plays forward-centre. She was part of the bronze medal-winning Australia women's national wheelchair basketball team at the 2008 Summer Paralympics in Beijing.

Active in fund raising from an early age, O'Kelly-Kennedy took a group of children with missing limbs to the 2000 Paralympic Games in Sydney, where she saw the Australia women's national wheelchair basketball team, known as the Gliders, in action for the first time, and was inspired to take up wheelchair basketball. She entered the University of Illinois on a half-scholarship in 2005, and won three US National Championships with its Women's team.

By 2006, she was part of the Gliders team that finished fourth at the World Wheelchair Basketball Championship in Amsterdam in 2006. She played professionally in Italy in 2010–11 with Sassari and with Elecom Roma in 2011–12. Although not selected for the Gliders team that played at the 2012 Summer Paralympic Games in London, she won a bronze medal with Elecom Roma in the Men's European Championships that year and returned to the Gliders line up for the Osaka Cup in 2013 and for the 2013 Asian Qualifiers in Thailand for the World Championships to be held in Canada on 19–29 June 2014.

== Personal life ==
O'Kelly-Kennedy was born on 21 June 1986. At birth one of her legs was shorter than the other, and her right foot was amputated when she was eighteen months old. She attended Melbourne Rudolf Steiner School and Luther College in the outer-eastern Melbourne suburb of Croydon. She has regularly represented the Royal Children's Hospital on television and in newspapers for the Good Friday Appeal. In 2000, she was involved in fund raising to take a group of children with missing limbs to the 2000 Paralympic Games in Sydney, where they became a cheer squad. In Sydney, she saw the Australia women's national wheelchair basketball team, known as the Gliders, in action for the first time.

She later founded a charitable organisation, Set No Limits and in 2013 helped establish the Red Dust Heelers Healing thru Wheeling program which has a focus on connecting Indigenous young people with disability to sport, education, employment and lifestyle opportunities. She has modelled for Vertically Blessed, a clothing company, and has gone by a number of nicknames, including Kat, Kitty, Blondie and Felix.

== Wheelchair basketball ==
O'Kelly-Kennedy is a 4 point player who plays Centre/Forward. She had played junior 'stand up' basketball but after the Sydney games she was persuaded to try wheelchair basketball by family friend and Wheelchair Basketball Legend, Kevin Coombs and Paralympic athletic champions Don Elgin and Tim Matthews, who became her mentors. She joined the Victorian Women's Wheelchair Basketball Team (development) in 2001, and represented the state at the National Junior Basketball Championships in Ballarat, Victoria, in 2002. This was also the year she became a member of the Victorian Women's Wheelchair Basketball Team. In 2003, O'Kelly-Kennedy became part of the Australian Development Team, and participated in her first overseas tournament, in New Zealand. She was part of the Victorian team at the National Junior Championships, Adelaide, and travelled to Toronto, Ontario, Canada, for the Spitfire Tournament. She represented Australia for the first time at the Tri-Nation Tournament in the United States in 2003.

After O'Kelly-Kennedy graduated from high school in 2004, she received an offer of a half-scholarship to University of Illinois, where she was coached by Mike Frogley. She was also awarded a scholarship from the Victorian Institute of Sport in 2006 and 2007. She went on to win three US National Championships with the University of Illinois team, in 2006, 2007 and 2008. In one game she scored a career high of 42 points.

In 2006, O'Kelly-Kennedy was part of the national team at the Roosevelt Tournament in Warm Springs, Georgia, and was then at the World Wheelchair Basketball Championship in Amsterdam in 2006, where Australia finished fourth. She was part of the Gliders' line up at the Osaka Cup in 2007, where the Gliders finished second, at the Asia Pacific Beijing Qualifications Tournament in Sydney in 2007, where the Gliders finished first, and at the Friendly Games held alongside that tournament, in which the Gliders finished second. She was also part the Gliders line up at the 2008 Summer Paralympics in Beijing, where the Gliders defeated Japan in the bronze medal game, 53–47.

O'Kelly-Kennedy was recruited by Italian Men's Professional League reigning champions, Lottomatica Elecom Roma, for the 2011–12 season, winning the bronze medal at the 2011-12 European Championships in Turkey.

O'Kelly-Kennedy played for the Stacks Goudcamp Bears in the Women's National League in 2012, scoring a competition-rare triple double in the Preliminary Final. In 2013 she played again with the Bears, with the team earning consecutive runner-up medals. In February 2013 she also returned to the National team for the 2013 Osaka Cup, where the Gliders successfully defended the title they had won in 2008, 2009, 2010 and 2012, and for the Asian Qualifiers in Bangkok in November 2013.

Season statistics
Competition	Season	Matches	FGM-FGA	FG%	3FGM-3FGA	3FG%	FTM-FTA	FT%	PF	Pts	TOT	AST	PTS
WNWBL	2013	15	93–231	40.3	—	0.0	15-36	41.0	14	201	11.7	2.5	13.4
WNWBL	2012	9	54–137	39.4	—	0.0	14–40	35.0	25	122	9.9	2.4	13.6
WNWBL	2011	18	105–199	52.8	—	0.0	14–43	32.6	42	224	6.6	2.2	12.4
WNWBL	2010	5	24–54	44.4	—	0.0	4–11	36.4	8	52	10.2	3.4	10.4

Key
FGM, FGA, FG%: field goals made, attempted and percentage
3FGM, 3FGA, 3FG%: three-point field goals made, attempted and percentage
FTM, FTA, FT%: free throws made, attempted and percentage
PF: personal fouls
Pts, PTS: points, average per game
TOT: turnovers average per game
AST: assists average per game

== Kayaking ==
At the 2022 ICF Canoe Sprint World Championships, she finished 9th in the Women's KL3.
