= Felicia Laberer =

German Para canoeist (born 2001)

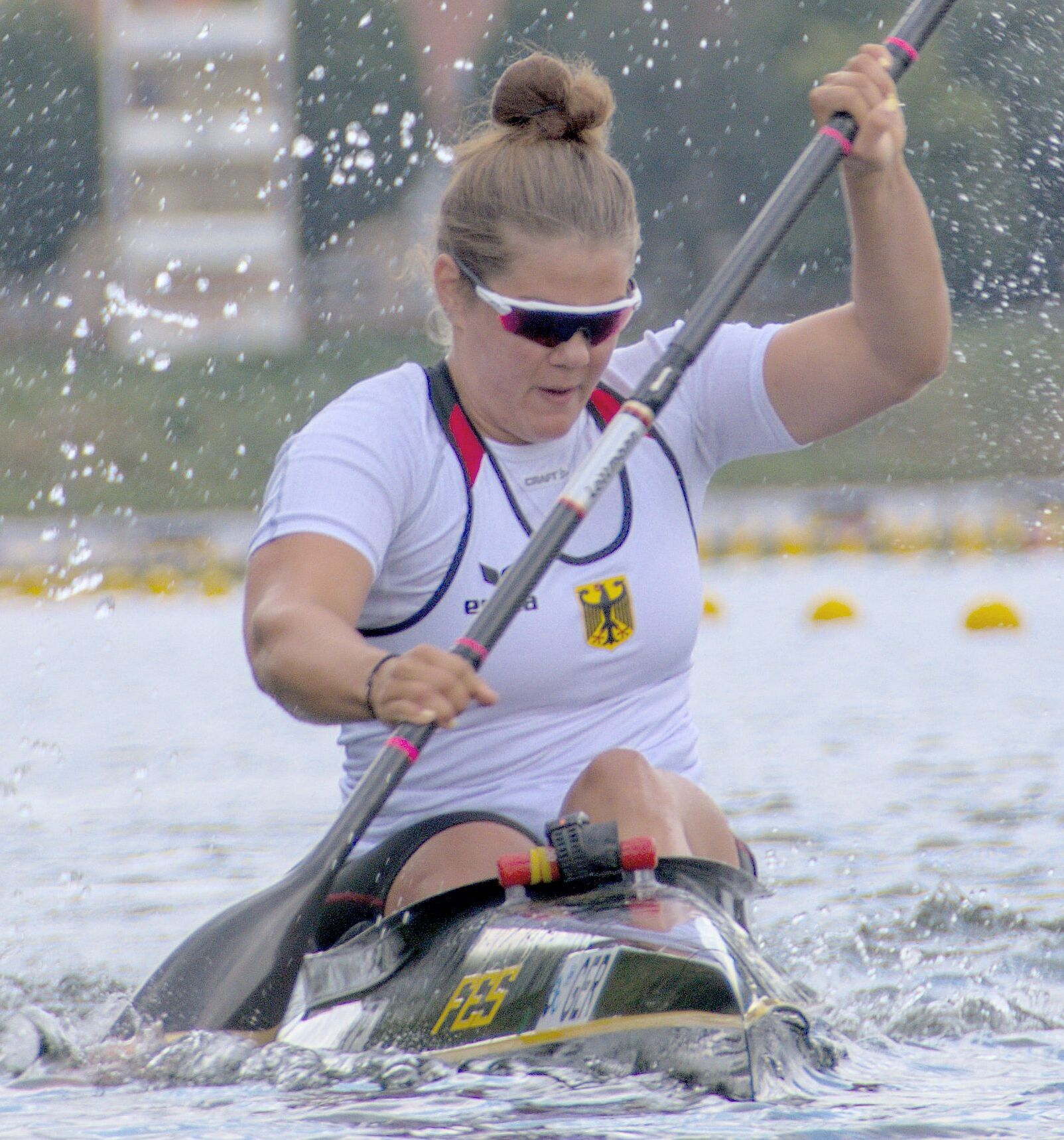
- Laberer in 2022

Personal information
- Born: 13 May 2001 (age 25) Berlin, Germany

Sport
- Country: Germany
- Sport: Para canoe
- Disability: Proximal femoral focal deficiency
- Disability class: KL3
- Club: SC Berlin-Grunau
- Coached by: Andre Brendel
Medal record
Women's Para canoe
Representing Germany
Event	1st	2nd	3rd
Paralympic Games	0	0	2
World Championships	0	0	4
European Championships	1	0	0
Total	1	0	6
Paralympic Games
Bronze medal – third place	2020 Tokyo	KL3
Bronze medal – third place	2024 Paris	KL3
World Championships
Bronze medal – third place	2022 Dartmouth	KL3
Bronze medal – third place	2023 Duisburg	KL3
Bronze medal – third place	2025 MIlan	KL3
Bronze medal – third place	2026 Poznán	KL3
European Championships
Gold medal – first place	2021 Poznań	KL3

Felicia Laberer (born 13 May 2001) is a German Para canoeist. She represented Germany at the 2020 and 2024 Summer Paralympics.

== Career ==
Laberer represented Germany at the 2021 Canoe Sprint European Championships in the women's KL3 event and won a gold medal.

Laberer represented Germany at the 2020 Summer Paralympics in the women's KL3 event and won a bronze medal. For winning a bronze medal at the Paralympics, she was awarded the Silver Laural leaf by the President of the Federal Republic of Germany.
