= Kelly Allen =

American paracanoeist

Personal information
- Born: June 19, 1992 (age 34) Oklahoma City, Oklahoma, U.S.
- Education: Northern Michigan University; University of Central Oklahoma

Sport
- Country: United States
- Sport: Paracanoe
- Disability: Proximal femoral focal deficiency
- Coached by: Shaun Caven

Kelly Allen (born June 19, 1992) is an American paracanoeist who competes in international level events. Allen was born without her left leg and uses a prosthetic leg in daily life.
