= Helene Ripa =

Swedish Paralympic athlete

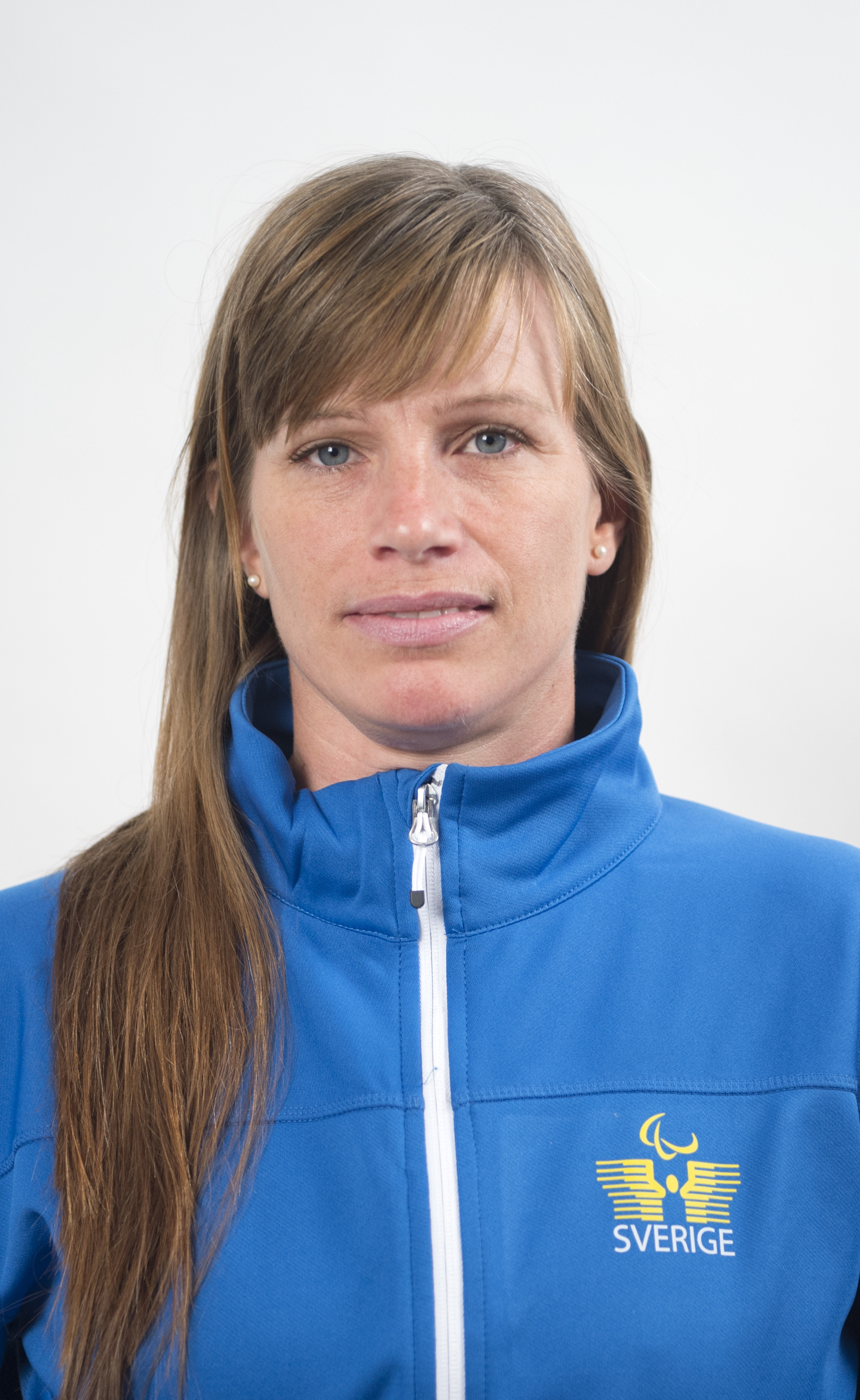
- Ripa in 2013

Personal information
- Full name: Helene Barbro Ripa
- Born: 22 August 1971 (age 55) Spånga, Sweden

Sport
- Sport: Swimming, cross-country skiing, mountain bike orienteering, paracanoe

Achievements and titles
- Paralympic finals: 2014 Winter Paralympics: Cross-country skiing 15 km free – Gold; Cross-country skiing 4×2.5-kilometre mixed relay – Silver
Medal record
Representing Sweden
Women's cross-country skiing
Paralympic Games
Gold medal – first place	2014 Sochi	15 km free
Silver medal – second place	2014 Sochi	4×2.5 km mixed
Women's paracanoe
ICF World Championships
Gold medal – first place	2018 Montemor-o-Velho	KL3
- Updated on 24 August 2018

Helene Barbro Ripa (born 22 August 1971) is a Swedish former Paralympic athlete who has participated in swimming, cross-country skiing, mountain bike orienteering and canoeing events. She qualified as a swimmer for the 1992 Paralympic Games but finished outside the medal considerations. Ripa won a gold medal in cross-country skiing—her first Paralympic skiing event—and subsequently a silver medal at the 2014 Paralympics in Sochi, Russia. She competed in canoeing at the 2016 Paralympic Games in Rio de Janeiro, Brazil, marking three Paralympic appearances in three sports. She competed at the 2020 Summer Paralympics, in Women's KL3.

== Sports career ==
=== Swimming ===
At the age of fourteen, Helene Ripa was diagnosed with cancer in her right leg and doctors were forced to amputate the limb above the knee. Following her rehabilitation, she took up swimming. She swam for Nacka HI and won several championships between 1988 and 1993 for the club. Among these were twenty-three Swedish Championship medals—ten of those gold. She also won four medals at the 1991 European Championship in Barcelona, including one gold medal. She won five medals during the swimming championships in 1993; three of which were gold medals. Ripa qualified for the 1992 Paralympic Games but did not win any medals.

In 1993, Ripa was forced to end her swimming career due to injuries, opting instead to learn interior decorating and move to New York City. She later returned to Stockholm, where she started a dressmaking business that specialized in home decorating. Her dressmaking business lasted for about seven years.

=== Skiing ===
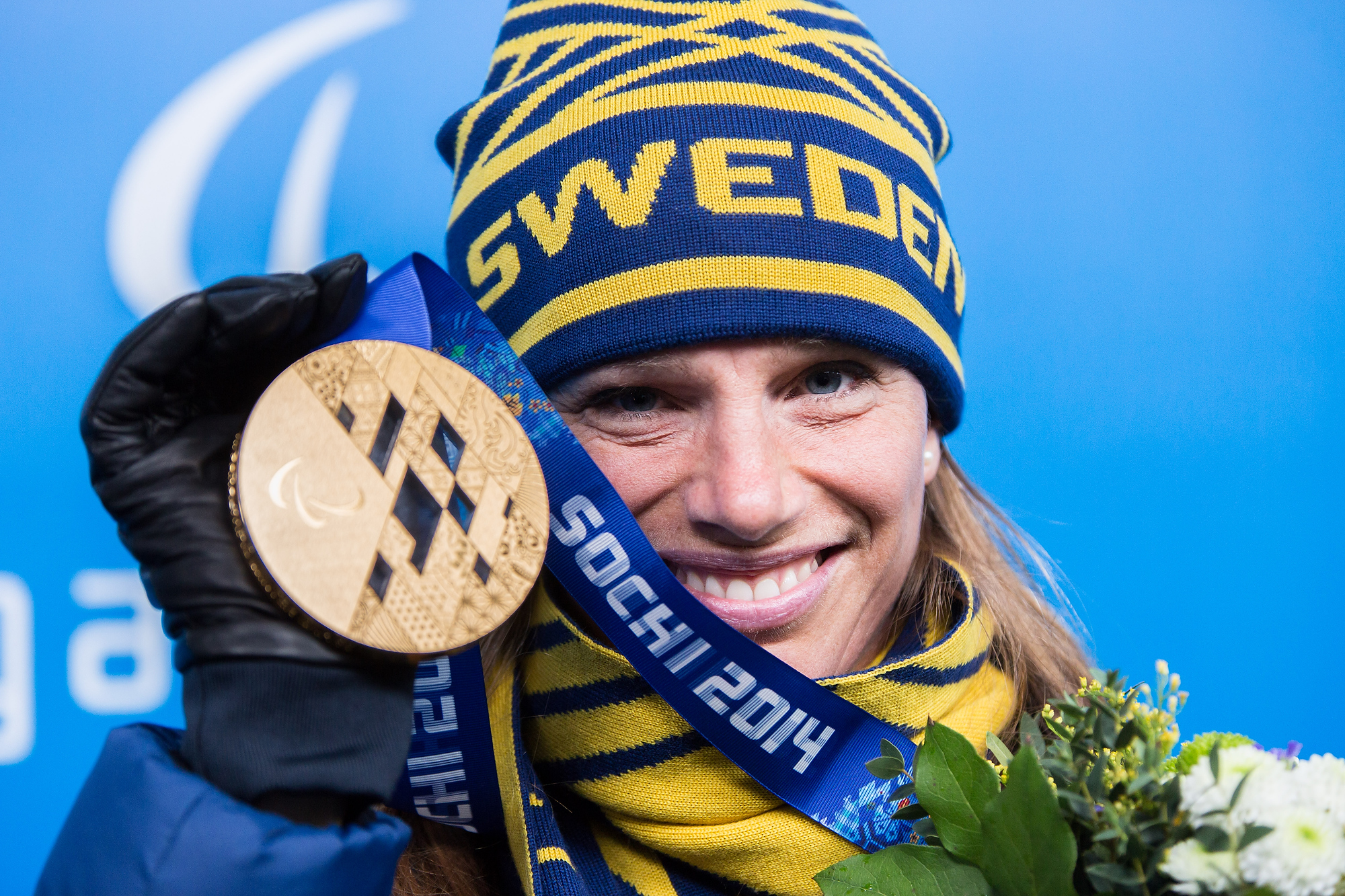
Ripa showing her gold medal at the Sochi games

In 2003, Ripa met her future husband Ronnie Pettersson, whose athletic interests motivated her to return to sport. This time she participated in cycling, paddling and skiing. In 2011 in Tjejvasan, Ripa competed in her first cross-country skiing event. In 2012, she qualified for Sweden's cross-country national team. Following several good results, she placed sixth in the Total World Cup IPC Nordic Skiing 2012/13.

At the 2014 Paralympics in Sochi, Russia, Ripa won a gold medal in the 15 km classic cross-country event. It was her first Paralympic start as a competitive skier. By winning the event, she became Sweden's first Paralympic Winter Games gold medalist since the 1994 Winter Paralympics in Lillehammer. In the mixed relay, Ripa competed with Zebastian Modin and they won a silver medal. Ripa was nominated for Bragdguldet, Jerringpriset ("The Jerring Award") and "Achievement of the Year" at the Svenska Idrottsgalan ("Swedish Athletics Gala") for her success at the 2014 Games.

=== Mountain bike orienteering ===
Ripa also competes in mountain bike orienteering for the club Haninge SOK. She placed second in 0-Ringen, which was held in Boden, Sweden, in 2013, and won silver at the Swedish Championships in Eksjö in 2014. At the Swedish Championships in Söderhamn in 2015, Ripa won a silver medal in sprint.

=== Canoeing ===
In mid-2015, Ripa started training and competing in canoeing for Brunnsvikens Kanotklubb. She initially considered it as a complement to her skiing. At the World Championships in Duisburg, Germany, in May 2016, Ripa qualified for the final and thus also qualified for the canoe sprint at the 2016 Paralympic Games in Rio de Janeiro, Brazil. The 2016 Games was the first Paralympics in which para-canoeing was an event; athletes could compete in three classes; KL1, KL2 and KL3 for K-1 200 metres. During the European Championships in Moscow, Russia, in June 2016, Ripa won the gold medal for K-1 200 metres in the KL3 class. She finished in fifth place in the final of the KL3 200-metre canoe sprint at the Rio Paralympics.

=== Media ===
Ripa presented the Sveriges Radio show Sommar i P1 ("Summer on P1") on 1 July 2014 where she described her life and career. She then appeared on the televised after-show Sommarpratarna ("Summer conversations"), which was broadcast on SVT in November 2014. Ripa participated in the TV4 game show Fort Boyard in 2014 where she teamed up with Thomas Wassberg and Jonas Hallberg to take on the physical challenges of the game show.
