= Erica Scarff =

Canadian paracanoeist (born 1996)

- Scarff in 2026

Personal information
- Full name: Erica Carmela Scarff
- Born: August 16, 1996 (age 30)
- Home town: Mississauga, Ontario, Canada
- Education: Brock University (St. Catharines)

Sport
- Country: Canada
- Sport: Paracanoe
- Disability: Osteosarcoma survivor
- Disability class: KL3
- Club: Mississauga Canoe Club, Mississauga, Canada
- Coached by: Mari Ellery

Erica Carmela Scarff (born August 16, 1996) is a Canadian paracanoeist who competes in international level events.

== Early life and education ==
She was a former national gymnast before she was diagnosed with osteosarcoma aged twelve after she broke her right leg when she ran into a vault in her gymnastics training session. Her leg was amputated soon after, in 2009. Scarff was a very active person before her diagnosis: she tried swimming, cycling and alpine skiing but chose canoeing. Since her diagnosis, she was inspired by Terry Fox who also had the same cancer as she did.

Scarff attended Brock University and studied kinesiology.

== Career ==
Scarff began her paracanoe journey after visiting Balmy Beach Canoe Club in 2013, training there under Mari Ellery. In 2014, she took a semester off from her studies at Brock University to train paracanoe in Florida. She placed sixth in the women's KL3 200-metre race at the 2016 Paracanoe World Championships.

Scarff competed in paracanoe at the 2016 Paralympics, the year the sport made is Paralympic debut. She place seventh in the women’s KL3 paracanoe sprints at the Games, 2.56 seconds behind the gold medalist. At the 2017 Canoe Sprint World Cup, Scarff won bronze in the women's KL3 200-metre. She placed first at the 2018 National Team Selections in the Para K1 women's 200-metre.

In 2021, Scarff began training VL3. In the women’s VL3 200-metre at the 2023 ICF World Canoe and Kayak Sprint Championships, Scarff won silver. She also won three gold medals in sit skiing at the 2023 Canada Winter Games.

Scarff will compete for Canada in paracanoe at the 2024 Summer Paralympics.

== Personal life ==
Scarff was hit by a car in 2018, resulting in injuries causing setbacks to her paracanoe career, including not qualifying for the 2020 Summer Paralympics.
