= Shahla Behrouzirad =

Iranian paracanoeist

Personal information
- Full name: Shahla Behrouzirad
- Born: 7 September 1985 Kermanshah, Iran
- Height: 1.61 m (5 ft 3 1/2 in)
- Weight: 59 kg (130 lb)

Sport
- Country: Iran
- Sport: Sprint kayak
Medal record
Sprint kayak
Representing Iran
World Championships
Bronze medal – third place	2019 Szeged	KL3
Asian Championship
Gold medal – first place	2011 Tehran
Gold medal – first place	2013 Uzbekistan
Gold medal – first place	2016 Uzbekistan
Gold medal – first place	2017 Thailand
Silver medal – second place	2017 Thailand
Gold medal – first place	2018 Uzbekistan
Silver medal – second place	2018 Uzbekistan
Gold medal – first place	2018 Uzbekistan
Silver medal – second place	2018 Uzbekistan
Asian Para Games
Silver medal – second place	2022 Hangzhou	KL3

Shahla Behrouzirad (Persian: شهلا بهروزی راد; born 7 September 1985) is an Iranian paracanoer. Behrouzirad was the first Iranian female kayaker to qualify for the Paralympic Games. She participated in the 2016 Summer Paralympics and the Tokyo 2020 Paralympics in her career, and she has set a unique record in this field. She finished 9th in the 2016 Summer Paralympics and 7th in the 2020 Summer Paralympics.

Behrouzirad won gold and silver medals in the Asian championship, and also won the silver medal in the Asian Para Games. In addition, she won a bronze medal in the ICF Canoe Sprint World Championships.
