= Canoe at the 2016 Summer Paralympics – Women's KL1 =

Women's KL1 at the XV Paralympic Games
- Venue: Lagoa Rodrigo de Freitas
- Dates: 14–15 September 2016
- Competitors: 10 from 10 nations

Medalists
1st place, gold medalist(s)		Jeanette Chippington	Great Britain
2nd place, silver medalist(s)		Edina Müller	Germany
3rd place, bronze medalist(s)		Kamila Kubas	Poland

The Canoe Sprint women's KL1 event at the 2016 Paralympic Games took place on 14 and 15 September 2016, at the Lagoa Rodrigo de Freitas. Two heats were held. Winners and runners up advanced directly to the final. The rest went into the semifinal, where the top four advanced to the final.

== Heats ==
=== Heat 1 ===
9:00 14 September 2016:

Rank	Lane	Name	Nationality	Time	Notes
1	6	Edina Müller	Germany	58.662	F
2	7	Katherinne Wollermann	Chile	1:01.740	F
3	5	Jocelyn Neumueller	Australia	1:03.658	SF
4	4	Monika Seryu	Japan	1:10.129	SF
5	8	Ann Yoshida	United States	1:17.747	SF

=== Heat 2 ===
9:05 14 September 2016:

Rank	Lane	Name	Nationality	Time	Notes
1	6	Jeanette Chippington	Great Britain	58.676	F
2	7	Kamila Kubas	Poland	1:01.387	F
3	4	Anita Váczi	Hungary	1:05.708	SF
4	5	Agnès Lacheux	France	1:06.323	SF
5	8	Eleni Prelorentzou	Greece	1:53.367	SF

== Semifinal ==
10:15 14 September 2016:

Rank	Lane	Name	Nationality	Time	Notes
1	6	Anita Váczi	Hungary	1:03.237	F
2	5	Jocelyn Neumueller	Australia	1:03.666	F
3	4	Agnès Lacheux	France	1:04.598	F
4	7	Monika Seryu	Japan	1:09.073	F
5	8	Eleni Prelorentzou	Greece	1:44.092	
–	3	Ann Yoshida	United States	DSQ	

== Final ==
9:00 15 September 2016:

Rank	Lane	Name	Nationality	Time	Notes
1st place, gold medalist(s)	5	Jeanette Chippington	Great Britain	58.760	
2nd place, silver medalist(s)	4	Edina Muller	Germany	58.874	
3rd place, bronze medalist(s)	3	Kamila Kubas	Poland	1:00.232	
4	6	Katherinne Wollermann	Chile	1:00.744	
5	2	Jocelyn Neumueller	Australia	1:03.361	
6	7	Anita Váczi	Hungary	1:03.688	
7	8	Agnès Lacheux	France	1:03.961	
8	1	Monika Seryu	Japan	1:09.193	
