= 2016 ICF Paracanoe World Championships – Women's KL1 =

Women's KL1 at the 2016 ICF Paracanoe World Championships
- Location: Duisburg, Germany
- Dates: 17–19 May
- Competitors: 17 from 15 nations
- Winning time: 56.846

Medalists
gold medal	Edina Müller	Germany
silver medal	Jeanette Chippington	Great Britain
bronze medal	Alexandra Dupik	Russia

The women's KL1 competition at the 2016 ICF Paracanoe World Championships took place in Duisburg.

== Schedule ==
The schedule was as follows:

Date	Time	Round
Tuesday 17 May 2016	14:15	Heats
Wednesday 18 May 2016	11:00	Semifinal
Thursday 19 May 2016	10:50	Final

All times are Central European Summer Time (UTC+2)

== Results ==
=== Heats ===
The fastest three boats in each heat advanced directly to the final. The next four fastest boats in each heat, plus the fastest remaining boat advanced to the semifinal.

==== Heat 1 ====
Rank	Name	Country	Time	Notes
1	Jeanette Chippington	Great Britain	56.627	QF
2	Kamila Kubas	Poland	58.925	QF
3	Svitlana Kupriianova	Ukraine	1:01.119	QF
4	Anita Váczi	Hungary	1:06.286	QS
5	Monika Seryu	Japan	1:06.521	QS
6	Juliet Kaine	Italy	1:09.480	QS
7	Akiko Nakajima	Japan	1:10.215	QS
8	Erica Davis	United States	1:19.041	qS
9	Silvana Santos Ferreira	Brazil	1:38.346	

==== Heat 2 ====
Rank	Name	Country	Time	Notes
1	Edina Müller	Germany	57.843	QF
2	Alexandra Dupik	Russia	1:00.647	QF
3	Katherinne Wollermann	Chile	1:02.646	QF
4	Jocelyn Neumueller	Australia	1:03.898	QS
5	Xie Maosan	China	1:05.589	QS
5	Agnès Lacheux	France	1:05.589	QS
7	Ann Yoshida	United States	1:16.540	QS
8	Eleni Prelorentzou	Greece	1:41.455	

=== Semifinal ===
The fastest three boats advanced to the final.

Rank	Name	Country	Time	Notes
1	Xie Maosan	China	59.293	QF
2	Jocelyn Neumueller	Australia	1:01.863	QF
3	Agnès Lacheux	France	1:03.127	QF
4	Anita Váczi	Hungary	1:05.133	
5	Monika Seryu	Japan	1:05.902	
6	Akiko Nakajima	Japan	1:15.302	
7	Ann Yoshida	United States	1:16.431	
8	Erica Davis	United States	1:21.398	
–	Juliet Kaine	Italy	DSQ	

=== Final ===
Competitors raced for positions 1 to 9, with medals going to the top three.

Rank	Name	Country	Time
1st place, gold medalist(s)	Edina Müller	Germany	56.846
2nd place, silver medalist(s)	Jeanette Chippington	Great Britain	57.037
3rd place, bronze medalist(s)	Alexandra Dupik	Russia	58.209
4	Kamila Kubas	Poland	59.282
5	Xie Maosan	China	1:00.809
6	Svitlana Kupriianova	Ukraine	1:02.003
7	Katherinne Wollermann	Chile	1:02.230
8	Jocelyn Neumueller	Australia	1:03.137
9	Agnès Lacheux	France	1:05.100
