= 2022 ICF Canoe Sprint World Championships – Women's KL1 =

Women's KL1 at the 2022 ICF Canoe Sprint World Championships
- Venue: Lake Banook
- Location: Dartmouth, Canada
- Dates: 4–6 August
- Competitors: 10 from 9 nations
- Winning time: 51.86

Medalists
gold medal	Maryna Mazhula	Ukraine
silver medal	Katherinne Wollermann	Chile
bronze medal	Brianna Hennessy	Canada

The women's KL1 competition at the 2022 ICF Canoe Sprint World Championships in Dartmouth took place on Lake Banook.

== Schedule ==
The schedule was as follows:

Date	Time	Round
Thursday 4 August 2022	9:50	Heats
Thursday 4 August 2022	15:45	Semifinal
Saturday 6 August 2022	10:20	Final

All times are Atlantic Daylight Time (UTC−3)

== Results ==
=== Heats ===
The fastest three boats in each heat advanced directly to the final.
The next four fastest boats in each heat, plus the fastest remaining boat advanced to the semifinal.

==== Heat 1 ====
Rank	Canoeist	Country	Time	Notes
1	Maryna Mazhula	Ukraine	56.58	QF
2	Eleonora De Paolis	Italy	57.87	QF
3	Jeanette Chippington	Great Britain	1:00.36	QF
4	Johanna Pflügner	Germany	1:03.73	QS
5	Pooja Ojha	India	1:29.52	QS

==== Heat 2 ====
Rank	Canoeist	Country	Time	Notes
1	Edina Müller	Germany	55.94	QF
2	Katherinne Wollermann	Chile	56.10	QF
3	Brianna Hennessy	Canada	57.16	QF
4	Adriana Azevedo	Brazil	1:04.28	QS
5	Erika Pulai	Hungary	1:07.72	QS

=== Semifinal ===
The fastest three boats advanced to the final.

Rank	Canoeist	Country	Time	Notes
1	Johanna Pflügner	Germany	1:04.22	QF
2	Adriana Azevedo	Brazil	1:04.85	QF
3	Erika Pulai	Hungary	1:08.75	QF
	Pooja Ojha	India	DNF	

=== Final ===
Competitors raced for positions 1 to 9, with medals going to the top three.

Rank	Name	Country	Time
1st place, gold medalist(s)	Maryna Mazhula	Ukraine	51.86
2nd place, silver medalist(s)	Katherinne Wollermann	Chile	52.32
3rd place, bronze medalist(s)	Brianna Hennessy	Canada	52.89
4	Edina Müller	Germany	53.25
5	Eleonora De Paolis	Italy	54.04
6	Jeanette Chippington	Great Britain	56.01
7	Adriana Azevedo	Brazil	57.95
8	Johanna Pflügner	Germany	58.71
9	Erika Pulai	Hungary	1:02.62
