= 2023 ICF Canoe Sprint World Championships – Women's KL1 =

Women's KL1 at the 2023 ICF Canoe Sprint World Championships
- Venue: Sportpark Duisburg
- Location: Duisburg, Germany
- Dates: 24–27 August
- Competitors: 11 from 10 nations
- Winning time: 51.824

Medalists
gold medal	Maryna Mazhula	Ukraine
silver medal	Katherinne Wollermann	Chile
bronze medal	Brianna Hennessy	Canada

The women's KL1 competition at the 2023 ICF Canoe Sprint World Championships in Duisburg took place at Sportpark Duisburg.

== Schedule ==
The schedule was as follows:

Date	Time	Round
Thursday 24 August 2023	11:25	Heats
Saturday 26 August 2023	16:30	Semifinal
Sunday 27 August 2023	11:04	Final

All times are Central European Summer Time (UTC+2)

== Results ==
=== Heats ===
The fastest three boats in each heat advanced directly to the final.
The next four fastest boats in each heat, plus the fastest remaining boat advanced to the semifinal.

==== Heat 1 ====
Rank	Name	Country	Time	Notes
1	Maryna Mazhula	Ukraine	52.492	QF
2	Edina Müller	Germany	54.277	QF
3	Eleonora de Paolis	Italy	56.409	QF
4	Monika Seryu	Japan	57.776	QS
5	Ana Cláudia Fiche Ungarelli Borges	Brazil	1:01.250	QS
6	Pooja Ojha	India	58.969	QS

==== Heat 2 ====
Rank	Name	Country	Time	Notes
1	Brianna Hennessy	Canada	52.324	QF
2	Katherinne Wollermann	Chile	52.651	QF
3	Xie Maosan	China	54.383	QF
4	Jeanette Chippington	Great Britain	55.449	QS
5	Adriana Gomes de Azevedo	Brazil	57.684	QS

=== Semifinal ===
The fastest three boats advanced to the final.

Rank	Name	Country	Time	Notes
1	Jeanette Chippington	Great Britain	56.308	QF
2	Monika Seryu	Japan	58.505	QF
3	Adriana Gomes de Azevedo	Brazil	59.116	QF
4	Ana Cláudia Fiche Ungarelli Borges	Brazil	1:03.868	
5	Pooja Ojha	India	1:13.960	

=== Final ===
Competitors raced for positions 1 to 9, with medals going to the top three.

Rank	Name	Country	Time
1st place, gold medalist(s)	Maryna Mazhula	Ukraine	51.824
2nd place, silver medalist(s)	Katherinne Wollermann	Chile	53.571
3rd place, bronze medalist(s)	Brianna Hennessy	Canada	53.800
4	Edina Müller	Germany	54.692
5	Xie Maosan	China	55.630
6	Eleonora De Paolis	Italy	56.577
7	Jeanette Chippington	Great Britain	57.936
8	Adriana Gomes de Azevedo	Brazil	59.222
9	Monika Seryu	Japan	1:01.464
