= 2017 ICF Canoe Sprint World Championships – Women's KL1 =

Women's KL1 at the 2017 ICF Canoe Sprint World Championships
- Venue: Sportcentrum Račice
- Location: Račice, Czech Republic
- Dates: 23–26 August
- Competitors: 10 from 10 nations
- Winning time: 57.383

Medalists
gold medal	Jeanette Chippington	Great Britain
silver medal	Alexandra Dupik	Russia
bronze medal	Katherinne Wollermann	Chile

The women's KL1 competition at the 2017 ICF Canoe Sprint World Championships in Račice took place at the Sportcentrum Račice.

== Schedule ==
The schedule was as follows:

Date	Time	Round
Wednesday 23 August 2017	09:15	Heats
Wednesday 23 August 2017	10:45	Semifinal
Saturday 26 August 2017	14:35	Final

All times are Central European Summer Time (UTC+2)

== Results ==
=== Heats ===
The fastest three boats in each heat advanced directly to the final. The next four fastest boats in each heat, plus the fastest remaining boat advanced to the semifinal.

==== Heat 1 ====
Rank	Name	Country	Time	Notes
1	Edina Müller	Germany	58.020	QF
2	Maryna Mazhula	Ukraine	1:00.814	QF
3	Kamila Kubas	Poland	1:00.942	QF
4	Monika Seryu	Japan	1:03.964	QS
5	Juliet Kaine	Italy	1:11.603	QS

==== Heat 2 ====
Rank	Name	Country	Time	Notes
1	Jeanette Chippington	Great Britain	56.147	QF
2	Alexandra Dupik	Russia	56.508	QF
3	Katherinne Wollermann	Chile	57.202	QF
4	Jocelyn Neumueller	Australia	1:01.130	QS
5	Adriana Gomes de Azevedo	Brazil	1:13.597	QS

=== Semifinal ===
The fastest three boats advanced to the final.

Rank	Name	Country	Time	Notes
1	Jocelyn Neumueller	Australia	59.976	QF
2	Monika Seryu	Japan	1:03.509	QF
3	Juliet Kaine	Italy	1:09.509	QF
4	Adriana Gomes de Azevedo	Brazil	1:11.115	

=== Final ===
Competitors raced for positions 1 to 9, with medals going to the top three.

Rank	Name	Country	Time
1st place, gold medalist(s)	Jeanette Chippington	Great Britain	57.382
2nd place, silver medalist(s)	Alexandra Dupik	Russia	57.871
3rd place, bronze medalist(s)	Katherinne Wollermann	Chile	58.665
4	Maryna Mazhula	Ukraine	58.827
5	Edina Müller	Germany	59.943
6	Kamila Kubas	Poland	1:00.910
7	Jocelyn Neumueller	Australia	1:02.738
8	Monika Seryu	Japan	1:05.010
9	Juliet Kaine	Italy	1:12.621
