= 2024 ICF Paracanoe World Championships – Women's KL1 =

Women's KL1 at the 2024 ICF Paracanoe World Championships
- Venue: Olympic Centre of Szeged
- Location: Szeged, Hungary
- Dates: 10–11 May
- Competitors: 11 from 10 nations
- Winning time: 52.83

Medalists
gold medal	Katherinne Wollermann	Chile
silver medal	Maryna Mazhula	Ukraine
bronze medal	Edina Müller	Germany

The women's KL1 competition at the 2024 ICF Paracanoe World Championships in Szeged took place at the Olympic Centre of Szeged.

== Schedule ==
The schedule was as follows:

Date	Time	Round
Friday 10 May 2024	16:33	Heats
Saturday 11 May 2024	9:00	Semifinal
Saturday 11 May 2024	15:05	Final

All times are Central European Summer Time (UTC+2)

== Results ==
=== Heats ===
The fastest three boats in each heat advanced directly to the final.
The next four fastest boats in each heat, plus the fastest remaining boat advanced to the semifinal.

==== Heat 1 ====
Rank	Name	Country	Time	Notes
1	Maryna Mazhula	Ukraine	54.77	QF
2	Edina Müller	Germany	55.21	QF
3	Xie Maosan	China	56.23	QF
4	Adriana Gomes de Azevedo	Brazil	59.90	QS
5	Monika Seryu	Japan	1:02.80	QS

==== Heat 2 ====
Rank	Name	Country	Time	Notes
1	Katherinne Wollermann	Chile	55.72	QF
2	Brianna Hennessy	Canada	56.50	QF
3	Jeanette Chippington	Great Britain	58.82	QF
4	Eleonora de Paolis	Italy	59.39	QS
5	Ana Ungarelli Borges	Brazil	1:02.86	QS
6	Pooja Ojha	India	1:15.80	QS

=== Semifinal ===
The fastest three boats advanced to the final.

Rank	Name	Country	Time	Notes
1	Adriana Gomes de Azevedo	Brazil	57.57	QF
2	Eleonora de Paolis	Italy	57.72	QF
3	Monika Seryu	Japan	58.15	QF
4	Ana Ungarelli Borges	Brazil	1:00.74	
5	Pooja Ojha	India	1:12.67	

=== Final ===
Competitors raced for positions 1 to 9, with medals going to the top three.

Rank	Name	Country	Time
1st place, gold medalist(s)	Katherinne Wollermann	Chile	52.83
2nd place, silver medalist(s)	Maryna Mazhula	Ukraine	53.13
3rd place, bronze medalist(s)	Edina Müller	Germany	53.62
4	Xie Maosan	China	54.67
5	Brianna Hennessy	Canada	54.75
6	Jeanette Chippington	Great Britain	56.48
7	Eleonora de Paolis	Italy	57.52
8	Adriana Gomes de Azevedo	Brazil	58.64
9	Monika Seryu	Japan	59.59
