= Canoe at the 2020 Summer Paralympics – Women's KL1 =

Women's KL1 at the XVI Paralympic Games
- Venue: Sea Forest Waterway
- Dates: 2–4 September 2021
- Competitors: 11 from 11 nations

Medalists
1st place, gold medalist(s)		Edina Müller	Germany
2nd place, silver medalist(s)		Maryna Mazhula	Ukraine
3rd place, bronze medalist(s)		Katherinne Wollermann	Chile

The Canoe Sprint women's KL1 event at the 2020 Paralympic Games took place on 2 and 4 September 2021. Two initial heats were held. Winners advanced directly to the final. The rest went into one of two semifinals, where the top three in each semifinal also advanced to the final.

== Schedule ==
Date	Time	Round
Thursday, 2 September 2021	10:50	Heats
Saturday, 4 September 2021	09:30	Semifinals
Saturday, 4 September 2021	10:48	Final A

== Results ==
=== Heats ===
Heat 1

Rank	Lane	Name	Nationality	Time	Notes
1	4	Edina Müller	Germany	56.391	FA, PB
2	5	Maryna Mazhula	Ukraine	56.871	SF
3	7	Xie Maosan	China	57.953	SF
4	3	Alexandra Dupik	RPC	59.850	SF
5	2	Jeanette Chippington	Great Britain	1:02.826	SF
6	6	Erika Pulai	Hungary	1:08.790	SF

Heat 2

Rank	Lane	Name	Nationality	Time	Notes
1	4	Katherinne Wollermann	Chile	57.121	FA
2	5	Eleonora de Paolis	Italy	57.659	SF
3	3	Brianna Hennessy	Canada	59.656	SF
4	2	Monika Seryu	Japan	1:00.180	SF
5	6	Adriana Azevedo	Brazil	1:04.554	SF

=== Semifinals ===
Semifinal 1

Rank	Lane	Name	Nationality	Time	Notes
1	4	Maryna Mazhula	Ukraine	57.594	FA
2	3	Monika Seryu	Japan	1:00.489	FA
3	5	Brianna Hennessy	Canada	1:01.464	FA
4	6	Jeanette Chippington	Great Britain	1:01.762	

Semifinal 2

Rank	Lane	Name	Nationality	Time	Notes
1	4	Eleonora de Paolis	Italy	57.484	FA
2	5	Xie Maosan	China	57.575	FA
3	3	Alexandra Dupik	RPC	58.673	FA
4	6	Adriana Azevedo	Brazil	1:05.564	
5	2	Erika Pulai	Hungary	1:08.043	

=== Final A ===
Rank	Lane	Name	Nationality	Time	Notes
1st place, gold medalist(s)	5	Edina Müller	Germany	53.958	PB
2nd place, silver medalist(s)	6	Maryna Mazhula	Ukraine	54.805	
3rd place, bronze medalist(s)	4	Katherinne Wollermann	Chile	55.921	
4	3	Eleonora de Paolis	Italy	56.226	
5	7	Xie Maosan	China	56.894	
6	1	Alexandra Dupik	RPC	57.635	
7	2	Monika Seryu	Japan	57.998	
8	8	Brianna Hennessy	Canada	58.233	
