= 2019 ICF Canoe Sprint World Championships – Women's KL1 =

Women's KL1 at the 2019 ICF Canoe Sprint World Championships
- Venue: Olympic Centre of Szeged
- Location: Szeged, Hungary
- Dates: 21–24 August
- Competitors: 10 from 10 nations
- Winning time: 55.99

Medalists
gold medal	Maryna Mazhula	Ukraine
silver medal	Edina Müller	Germany
bronze medal	Katherinne Wollermann	Chile

The women's KL1 competition at the 2019 ICF Canoe Sprint World Championships in Szeged took place at the Olympic Centre of Szeged.

== Schedule ==
The schedule was as follows:

Date	Time	Round
Wednesday 21 August 2019	15:40	Heats
Thursday 22 August 2019	10:50	Semifinal
Saturday 24 August 2019	10:20	Final

All times are Central European Summer Time (UTC+2)

== Results ==
=== Heats ===
The fastest three boats in each heat advanced directly to the final.
The next four fastest boats in each heat, plus the fastest remaining boat advanced to the semifinal.

==== Heat 1 ====
Rank	Name	Country	Time	Notes
1	Maryna Mazhula	Ukraine	51.83	QF
2	Edina Müller	Germany	53.15	QF
3	Jeanette Chippington	Great Britain	54.13	QF
4	Xie Maosan	China	54.38	QS
5	Monika Seryu	Japan	54.61	QS

==== Heat 2 ====
Rank	Name	Country	Time	Notes
1	Katherinne Wollermann	Chile	54.18	QF
2	Eleonora de Paolis	Italy	54.71	QF
3	Alexandra Dupik	Russia	54.85	QF
4	Erika Pulai	Hungary	1:10.96	QS
5	Pooja Ojha	India	1:22.06	QS

=== Semifinal ===
The fastest three boats advanced to the final.

Rank	Name	Country	Time	Notes
1	Monika Seryu	Japan	54.92	QF
2	Xie Maosan	China	55.34	QF
3	Erika Pulai	Hungary	1:10.84	QF
4	Pooja Ojha	India	1:17.93	

=== Final ===
Competitors raced for positions 1 to 9, with medals going to the top three.

Rank	Name	Country	Time
1st place, gold medalist(s)	Maryna Mazhula	Ukraine	55.99
2nd place, silver medalist(s)	Edina Müller	Germany	56.97
3rd place, bronze medalist(s)	Katherinne Wollermann	Chile	58.03
4	Xie Maosan	China	58.25
5	Monika Seryu	Japan	58.93
6	Jeanette Chippington	Great Britain	59.24
7	Alexandra Dupik	Russia	59.30
8	Eleonora de Paolis	Italy	59.84
9	Erika Pulai	Hungary	1:18.92
