= 2018 ICF Canoe Sprint World Championships – Women's KL1 =

Women's KL1 at the 2018 ICF Canoe Sprint World Championships
- Venue: Centro de Alto Rendimento de Montemor-o-Velho
- Location: Montemor-o-Velho, Portugal
- Dates: 24 August
- Competitors: 7 from 7 nations
- Winning time: 55.665

Medalists
gold medal	Maryna Mazhula	Ukraine
silver medal	Eleonora de Paolis	Italy
bronze medal	Jeanette Chippington	Great Britain

The women's KL1 competition at the 2018 ICF Canoe Sprint World Championships in Montemor-o-Velho took place at the Centro de Alto Rendimento de Montemor-o-Velho.

== Schedule ==
The schedule was as follows:

Date	Time	Round
Friday 24 August 2018	10:27	Final

All times are Western European Summer Time (UTC+1)

== Results ==
With fewer than ten competitors entered, this event was held as a direct final.

Rank	Name	Country	Time
1st place, gold medalist(s)	Maryna Mazhula	Ukraine	55.665
2nd place, silver medalist(s)	Eleonora de Paolis	Italy	56.795
3rd place, bronze medalist(s)	Jeanette Chippington	Great Britain	57.050
4	Alexandra Dupik	Russia	57.260
5	Xie Maosan	China	58.485
6	Katherinne Wollermann	Chile	59.115
7	Monika Seryu	Japan	1:00.675
