= 2025 ICF Canoe Sprint World Championships – Women's KL1 =

Women's KL1 at the 2025 ICF Canoe Sprint World Championships
- Venue: Idroscalo Regatta Course
- Location: Milan, Italy
- Dates: 23 August
- Competitors: 9 from 9 nations
- Winning time: 53.52

Medalists
gold medal	Katherinne Wollermann	Chile
silver medal	Maryna Mazhula	Ukraine
bronze medal	Xie Maosan	China

The women's KL1 200 metres competition at the 2025 ICF Canoe Sprint World Championships in Milan took place in Idroscalo Regatta Course.

== Schedule ==
The schedule is as follows:

Date	Time	Round
Saturday 23 August 2025	09:55	Final

== Results ==
=== Final ===
Competitors raced for positions 1 to 9, with medals going to the top three.

Rank	Canoeist	Country	Time	Notes
1st place, gold medalist(s)	Katherinne Wollermann	Chile	53.52	
2nd place, silver medalist(s)	Maryna Mazhula	Ukraine	54.16	
3rd place, bronze medalist(s)	Xie Maosan	China	55.06	
4	Edina Müller	Germany	55.51	
5	Aleksandra Dupik	Individual Neutral Athletes	59.12	
6	Monika Seryu	Japan	1:01.61	
7	Adriana Gomes de Azevedo	Brazil	1:01.93	
8	Pooja Ojha	India	1:17.87	
9	Khristine Quek	Singapore	1:50.62	
