= 2026 ICF Canoe Sprint World Championships – Women's KL1 =

Women's KL1 at the 2026 ICF Canoe Sprint World Championships
- Venue: Lake Malta
- Location: Poznań, Poland
- Dates: 26–29 August
- Winning time: 52.23

Medalists
gold medal	Katherinne Wollermann	Chile
silver medal	Xie Maosan	China
bronze medal	Brianna Hennessy	Canada

The women's KL1 competition at the 2026 ICF Canoe Sprint World Championships in Poznań took place at Lake Malta.

== Schedule ==
The schedule is as follows:

Date	Time	Round
Wednesday 26 August 2026	10:50	Heats
Thursday 27 August 2026	11:41	Semifinals
Saturday 29 August 2026	10:44	Final

=== Finals ===
Competitors raced for positions 1 to 9, with medals going to the top three.

Rank	Lane	Name	Nation	Time	Gap
1st place, gold medalist(s)	3	Katherinne Wollermann	Chile	52.23	
2nd place, silver medalist(s)	4	Xie Maosan	China	53.92	+1.69
3rd place, bronze medalist(s)	5	Brianna Hennessy	Canada	54.20	+1.97
4	1	Aleksandra Dupika	Neutral Athlete A	58.51	+6.28
5	8	Edina Müller	Germany	58.75	+6.52
6	6	Susanna Wills	Australia	59.12	+6.89
7	2	Adriana Gomes de Azevedo	Brazil	1:00.11	+7.88
8	7	Monika Seryu	Japan	1:00.62	+8.39
9	9	Ana Cláudia Fiche Ungarelli Borges	Brazil	1:00.77	+8.54
