= 2021 ICF Canoe Sprint World Championships – Women's KL1 =

Women's KL1 at the 2021 ICF Canoe Sprint World Championships
- Venue: Lake Bagsværd
- Location: Copenhagen, Denmark
- Dates: 16–18 September
- Competitors: 10 from 9 nations
- Winning time: 52.69

Medalists
gold medal	Maryna Mazhula	Ukraine
silver medal	Edina Müller	Germany
bronze medal	Katherinne Wollermann	Chile

The women's KL1 competition at the 2021 ICF Canoe Sprint World Championships in Copenhagen took place on Lake Bagsværd.

== Schedule ==
The schedule was as follows:

Date	Time	Round
Thursday 16 September 2021	15:30	Heats
Friday 17 September 2021	10:45	Semifinal
Saturday 18 September 2021	10:44	Final

All times are Central European Summer Time (UTC+2)

== Results ==
=== Heats ===
The fastest three boats in each heat advanced directly to the final. The next four fastest boats in each heat, plus the fastest remaining boat advanced to the semifinal.

==== Heat 1 ====
Rank	Name	Country	Time	Notes
1	Maryna Mazhula	Ukraine	55.37	QF
2	Alexandra Dupik	RCF	57.95	QF
3	Adriana Azevedo	Brazil	1:04.18	QF
4	Andrea Bracamonte	Argentina	1:45.39	QS
–	Pooja Ojha	India	DNS	

==== Heat 2 ====
Rank	Name	Country	Time	Notes
1	Edina Müller	Germany	55.18	QF
2	Eleonora de Paolis	Italy	57.35	QF
3	Katherinne Wollermann	Chile	57.76	QF
4	Johanna Pflügner	Germany	1:05.35	QS
5	Erika Pulai	Hungary	1:08.29	QS

=== Semifinal ===
The fastest three boats advanced to the final.

Rank	Name	Country	Time	Notes
1	Johanna Pflügner	Germany	1:06.32	QF
2	Erika Pulai	Hungary	1:07.51	QF
3	Andrea Bracamonte	Argentina	1:50.55	QF

=== Final ===
Competitors raced for positions 1 to 9, with medals going to the top three.

Rank	Name	Country	Time
1st place, gold medalist(s)	Maryna Mazhula	Ukraine	52.69
2nd place, silver medalist(s)	Edina Müller	Germany	53.74
3rd place, bronze medalist(s)	Katherinne Wollermann	Chile	54.02
4	Eleonora de Paolis	Italy	55.57
5	Alexandra Dupik	RCF	57.06
6	Johanna Pflügner	Germany	1:02.41
7	Adriana Azevedo	Brazil	1:04.56
8	Erika Pulai	Hungary	1:06.37
9	Andrea Bracamonte	Argentina	1:49.94
