= 2025 ICF Canoe Sprint World Championships – Women's VL2 =

Women's VL2 at the 2025 ICF Canoe Sprint World Championships
- Venue: Idroscalo Regatta Course
- Location: Milan, Italy
- Dates: 21–24 August
- Competitors: 11 from 11 nations
- Winning time: 1:02.62

Medalists
gold medal	Anastasia Miasnikova	Individual Neutral Athletes
silver medal	Brianna Hennessy	Canada
bronze medal	Jeanette Chippington	Great Britain

The women's VL2 200 metres competition at the 2025 ICF Canoe Sprint World Championships in Milan took place at Idroscalo Regatta Course.

== Schedule ==
The schedule is as follows:

Date	Time	Round
Thursday 21 August 2025	15:15	Heats
Friday 22 August 2025	11:28	Semifinals
Sunday 24 August 2025	10:16	Final A

== Results ==
=== Heats ===
The fastest three boats in each heat advanced directly to the final.
The next four fastest boats in each heat, plus the fastest remaining boat advanced to the semifinal.

==== Heat 1 ====
Rank	Canoeist	Country	Time	Notes
1	Brianna Hennessy	Canada	1:00.62	FA
2	Anastasia Miasnikova	Individual Neutral Athletes	1:01.65	FA
3	Débora Benevides	Brazil	1:04.39	FA
4	Ines Felipe Vidigal	Spain	1:08.93	QS
5	Anna Bilovol	Poland	1:10.29	QS
6	Dalma Boldizsar	Hungary	1:11.15	QS

==== Heat 2 ====
Rank	Canoeist	Country	Time	Notes
1	Jeanette Chippington	Great Britain	1:06.97	FA
2	Ekaterina Statsenko	Individual Neutral Athletes	1:10.90	FA
3	Irodakhon Rustamova	Uzbekistan	1:11.73	FA
4	Edina Müller	Germany	1:12.39	QS
5	Veronica Biglia	Italy	1:15.85	QS
	Nisha Rawat	India	DNS	

=== Semifinal ===
The fastest three boats advanced to the final.

Rank	Canoeist	Country	Time	Notes
1	Veronica Biglia	Italy	1:06.31	FA
2	Ines Felipe Vidigal	Spain	1:08.53	FA
3	Edina Müller	Germany	1:09.01	FA
4	Dalma Boldizsar	Hungary	1:12.75	
5	Anna Bilovol	Poland	1:12.89	

=== Final ===
Competitors raced for positions 1 to 9, with medals going to the top three.

Rank	Canoeist	Country	Time	Notes
1	Anastasia Miasnikova	Individual Neutral Athletes	1:02.62	
2	Brianna Hennessy	Canada	1:04.12	
3	Jeanette Chippington	Great Britain	1:04.47	
4	Débora Benevides	Brazil	1:04.56	
5	Ekaterina Statsenko	Individual Neutral Athletes	1:07.80	
6	Irodakhon Rustamova	Uzbekistan	1:07.90	
7	Veronica Biglia	Italy	1:07.92	
8	Ines Felipe Vidigal	Spain	1:11.92	
9	Edina Müller	Germany	1:13.61	
