= Váczi =

Váczi is a Hungarian surname. Notable people with the surname include:

- Anita Váczi (born 1986), Hungarian paracanoeist
- Gheorghe Váczi (1922–2006), Romanian footballer
- Zoltán Váczi (born 1966), Hungarian footballer
