= 2017 ICF Canoe Sprint World Championships – Women's VL1 =

Women's VL1 at the 2017 ICF Canoe Sprint World Championships
- Venue: Sportcentrum Račice
- Location: Račice, Czech Republic
- Dates: 23 August
- Competitors: 3 from 2 nations
- Winning time: 1:12.335

Medalists
gold medal	Jocelyn Neumueller	Australia
silver medal	Akiko Nakajima	Japan
bronze medal	Monika Seryu	Japan

The women's VL1 competition at the 2017 ICF Canoe Sprint World Championships in Račice took place at the Sportcentrum Račice.

== Schedule ==
The schedule was as follows:

Date	Time	Round
Wednesday 23 August 2017	15:10	Final

All times are Central European Summer Time (UTC+2)

== Results ==
With fewer than ten competitors entered, this event was held as a direct final.

Rank	Name	Country	Time
1st place, gold medalist(s)	Jocelyn Neumueller	Australia	1:12.335
2nd place, silver medalist(s)	Akiko Nakajima	Japan	1:17.251
3rd place, bronze medalist(s)	Monika Seryu	Japan	1:36.668
