= Katherinne Wollermann =

Chilean Para canoeist (born 1992)

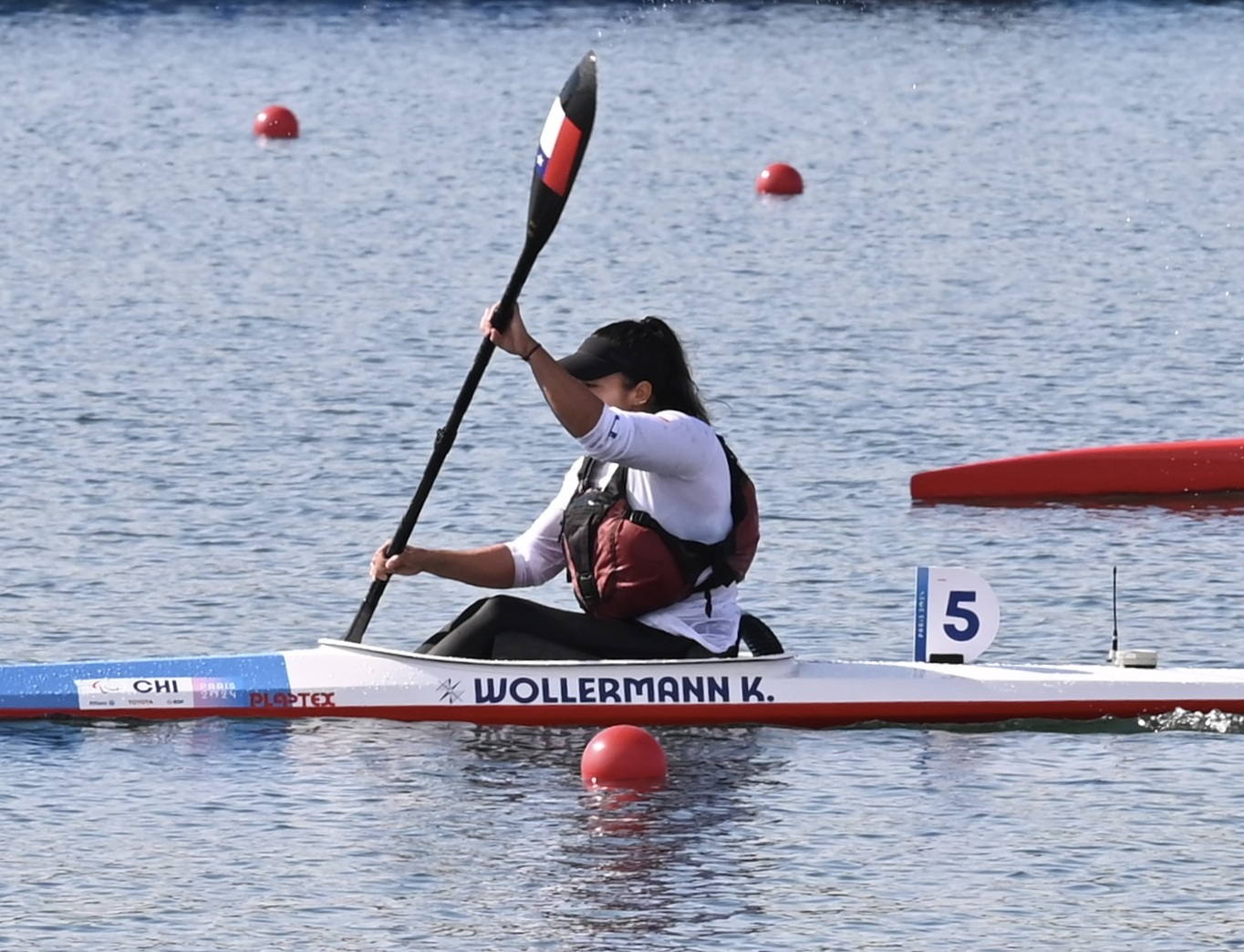
- Wollermann at the 2024 Summer Paralympics

Personal information
- Full name: Katherinne Mary Angel Wollermann Zapata
- Born: 12 August 1992 (age 34) Chiguayante, Chile

Sport
- Country: Chile
- Sport: Para canoe
- Disability: Transverse myelitis
- Disability class: KL1
Medal record
Women's Para canoe
Representing Chile
Paralympic Games
| Gold medal – first place | 2024 Paris | KL1 |
| Bronze medal – third place | 2020 Tokyo | KL1 |
World Championships
| Gold medal – first place | 2024 Szeged | KL1 |
| Gold medal – first place | 2025 Milan | KL1 |
| Gold medal – first place | 2026 Poznán | KL1 |
| Silver medal – second place | 2022 Dartmouth | KL1 |
| Silver medal – second place | 2023 Duisburg | KL1 |
| Bronze medal – third place | 2017 Racice | KL1 |
| Bronze medal – third place | 2019 Szeged | KL1 |
| Bronze medal – third place | 2021 Copenhagen | KL1 |

Katherinne Wollermann Zapata (born 12 August 1992) is a Chilean Para canoeist. She is regarded as Chile's leading competitor in the sport and is the nation's first Paralympic champion in paracanoeing.

== Early life ==
Wollermann was born in Chiguayante in 1992. In 2012, she became paraplegic due to medical negligence. She began her rehabilitation at the Fundación Teletón, where she took up paracanoeing. She had previously practiced athletics, basketball, swimming, and tennis.

At Teletón competitions in 2012, she represented Concepción and reached the podium in all her events, placing first in athletics, table tennis, and swimming. She subsequently chose to pursue canoeing professionally.

== Paracanoeing career ==
Wollermann made her paracanoeing debut at the 2013 South American Championships in Curauma, where she won a gold medal. She has since achieved Chile's top individual results in the sport, winning the Pan American Championships five times and becoming the first Chilean to win a medal at the Paracanoe World Championships.

At the 2016 Summer Paralympics in Rio de Janeiro, Wollermann placed fourth in the women's 200 m KL1 event, finishing just 0.02 seconds behind the bronze medallist, Ian Marsden.

At the continental level, Wollermann won gold at the 2017 South American Canoeing Championships in Paipa. This was followed by two gold medals at the 2017 Pan American Canoe and Paracanoe Championships in Ecuador. She also claimed gold at the 2018 Pan American Paracanoe Championships in Canada.

In World Cup competition, she won silver in 2018 in Hungary, and bronze at the 2019 World Cup in Poland and again in Hungary in 2021.

She qualified for the 2020 Summer Paralympics in Tokyo, where she won the bronze medal in the women's 200 m KL1 event with a time of 55.921 seconds.

In May 2024, Wollermann won gold in the KL1-200 at the Canoe World Cup in Hungary, recording a time of 52.83 seconds to finish ahead of Maryna Mazhula of Ukraine and Edina Mueller of Germany. This marked her first world-level title in the event and served as preparation for her participation in the 2024 Summer Paralympics. At the 2024 Summer Paralympics in Paris, she won the gold medal in the same event, setting a time of 51.95 seconds.

In August 2025, she successfully defended her world title in the KL1-200 at the 2025 Paracanoe World Championships in Milan, winning gold with a time of 53.52 seconds. She finished ahead of Maryna Mazhula and Maosan Xie of China, becoming a two-time world champion in the event.
