= Brianna Hennessy =

Canadian paracanoeist (born 1984)

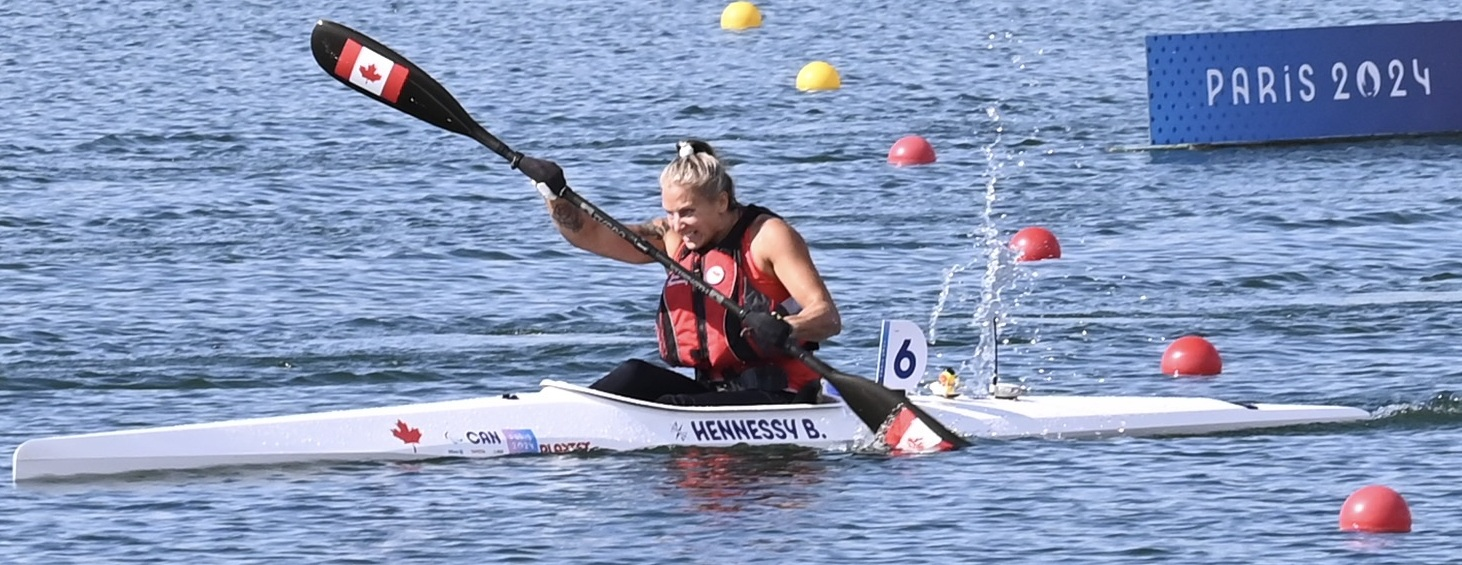
- Hennessy at the 2024 Summer Paralympics

Personal information
- Born: September 23, 1984 (age 41)
- Home town: Ottawa, Ontario, Canada
- Education: University of Ottawa

Sport
- Country: Canada
- Sport: Wheelchair rugby; Para canoe
- Disability class: KL1, VL2
- Club: Ottawa River Canoe Club
- Coached by: Joel Hazzan
Medal record
Women's Para canoe
Representing Canada
Paralympic Games
| Silver medal – second place | 2024 Paris | VL2 |
World Championships
| Silver medal – second place | 2022 Dartmouth | VL2 |
| Silver medal – second place | 2023 Duisburg | VL2 |
| Silver medal – second place | 2024 Samarkand | VL2 |
| Silver medal – second place | 2025 Milan | VL2 |
| Silver medal – second place | 2026 Poznań | VL2 |
| Bronze medal – third place | 2022 Dartmouth | KL1 |
| Bronze medal – third place | 2023 Duisburg | KL1 |
| Bronze medal – third place | 2026 Poznán | KL1 |

Brianna Hennessy (born September 23, 1984) is a Canadian Para canoeist and wheelchair rugby player. She is a multi-medalist at the ICF Canoe Sprint World Championships and won silver in the women's VL2 at the 2024 Summer Paralympics.

== Career ==
Prior to her accident, Hennessy was a multi-sport athlete. She played AA hockey, national level ball hockey, competed in provincial and national level women's rugby, was the Ontario Provincial boxing champion, and played eight years of competitive soccer. She was a member of the University of Ottawa Gee-Gees women's rugby team for the 2003–04 season.

In 2016, Hennessy was introduced to wheelchair rugby through the Ottawa Hospital Rehabilitation Centre. She went on to qualify for the Ontario provincial team and to play for the American men's team, the Tampa Bay Generals.

With the COVID-19 pandemic impacting practicing team sports, Hennessy took up para-canoe, training with Joel Hazzan at the Ottawa River Canoe Club, about sixth months before the qualification deadline for the upcoming Tokyo Paralympics. She qualified to represent Canada at the 2021 World Cup in Hungary in Women's KL1, and Women's VL2 and won 4th-place in the women's VL2 200m para-canoe sprint. Less than two years after beginning para-canoe, Hennessy made her Paralympic debut in the sport. At the 2020 Summer Paralympics, she placed placed fifth in the VL2 and eighth in the KL1 para canoe events.

At the 2022 ICF Canoe Sprint World Championships in Dartmouth, Nova Scotia, Hennessy won silver in the VL2 and bronze in the KL1 200-metre races. She won bronze in the women's KL1 and silver in the VL2 at the 2023 ICF Canoe Sprint World Championships.

In 2023, Hennessy was one of ten players selected to compete on Canada's first ever women's wheelchair rugby team for the 2033 Women's Rugby World Cup.

At the 2024 ICF Canoe Sprint World Championships, Hennessy won a silver medal in the women's VL2. She competed in her second Paralympic Games in 2024 in KL1 and VL2. She won silver in the women's 200-metre sprint VL2 and placed fourth in KL1 kayak women's 200-metres. Hennessy was chosen to be one of Canada's closing ceremony flag bearers for the Games.

== Personal life ==
Hennessy graduated from the University of Ottawa in 2008 with a degree in Health Sciences. She was hit by a cab in Toronto in 2014. She was diagnosed tetraplegic but has since regained some mobility in her upper body. Her mother, Norma, died in 2023.
