= Maryna Mazhula =

Ukrainian Para canoeist (born 1983)

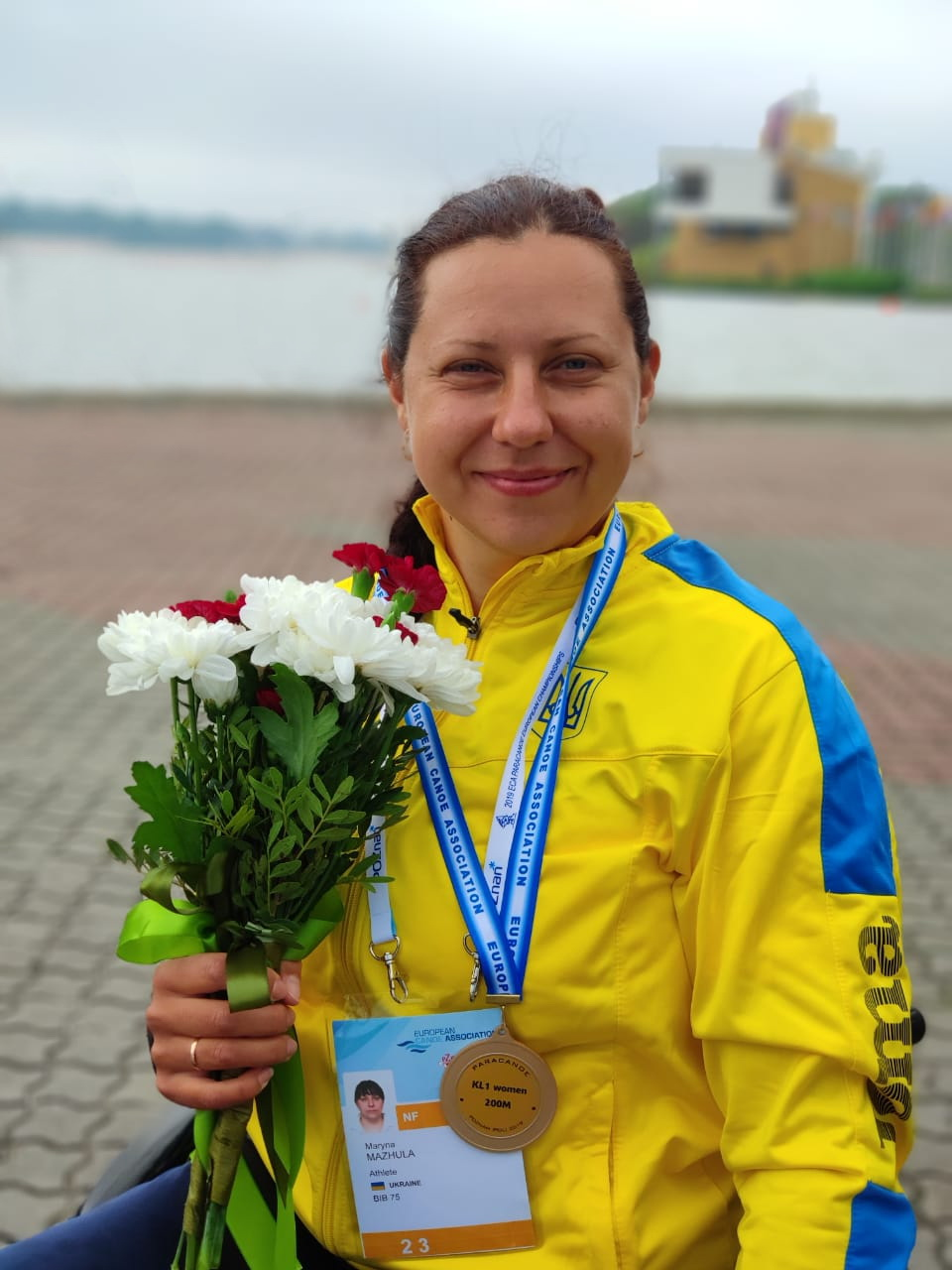

Personal information
- Born: 24 April 1983 (age 43) Mykolaiv, Ukrainian SSR

Sport
- Country: Ukraine
- Sport: Para canoe
- Disability class: KL1
- Club: Invasport
- Coached by: Vyacheslav Zagreba
Medal record
Women's Para canoe
Representing Ukraine
Event	1st	2nd	3rd
Paralympic Games	0	2	0
World Championships	5	2	0
European Championships	4	0	1
Total	9	4	1
Paralympic Games
Silver medal – second place	2020 Tokyo	KL1
Silver medal – second place	2024 Paris	KL1
World Championships
Gold medal – first place	2018 Montemor-o-Velho	KL1
Gold medal – first place	2019 Szeged	KL1
Gold medal – first place	2021 Copenhagen	KL1
Gold medal – first place	2022 Dartmouth	KL1
Gold medal – first place	2023 Duisburg	KL1
Silver medal – second place	2024 Szeged	KL1
Silver medal – second place	2025 Milan	KL1
European Championships
Gold medal – first place	2019 Poznań	KL1
Gold medal – first place	2021 Poznań	KL1
Gold medal – first place	2024 Szeged	KL1
Gold medal – first place	2025 Racice	KL1
Bronze medal – third place	2022 Munich	KL1

Maryna Mazhula (born 24 April 1983) is a Ukrainian Para canoeist. She is a five-time world champion in the women's KL1 event.

== Career ==
Mazhula won gold at the 2018 ICF Canoe Sprint World Championships in the women's KL1 event. She repeated as champion at the 2019, 2021, 2022 and 2023 ICF Canoe Sprint World Championships.

Mazhula represented Ukraine at the 2020 Summer Paralympics in the women's KL1 event and won a silver medal. She again represented Ukraine at the 2024 Summer Paralympics in the women's KL1 event and won a silver medal.
