= Eleni Prelorentzou =

Greek paracanoeist (born 1968)

Personal information
- Born: 23 December 1968 (age 56); Athens, Greece

Sport
- Country: Greece
- Sport: Paracanoe
- Disability class: KL1
- Coached by: Athanasios Giannopoulos

Eleni Prelorentzou (born 23 December 1968) is a Greek paracanoeist. Her highest achievement is reaching the semifinal in the paracanoe at the 2016 Summer Paralympics - Women's KL1. She has also competed in wheelchair fencing at the 2017 World Cup event in Pisa.
