= Jocelyn Neumueller =

Australian paracanoeist (born 1995)

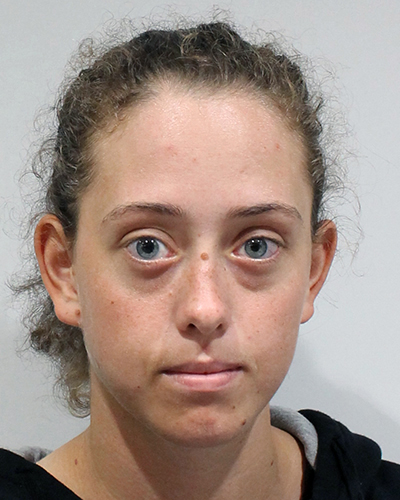
- Neumueller in 2016

Personal information
- Nationality: Australia
- Born: 2 August 1995 (age 31)

Sport
- Club: West Lakes Canoe Club
Medal record
Women's paracanoe
Representing Australia
World Championships
| Gold medal – first place | 2017 Račice | VL1 |

Jocelyn Neumueller (born 2 August 1995) is a paracanoeist. She competed for Australia at the 2016 Rio Paralympics.

== Personal ==
Neumueller was born on 2 August 1995. She is currently studying a Bachelor of Medical Science at Flinders University. She grew up in Victor Harbor, South Australia and lives in Adelaide, South Australia.

== Career ==
=== Canoeing ===
Neumueller is classified as a KL1 paracanoeist. She took up paracanoeing at the end of 2015, at the suggestion of a West Lakes Canoe Club member. At her first major events in 2016, she won gold medals in the Women's 200 m KL1 and Women's 200 m VL1 at both the Australian Championships and the Oceania Championships.

Her first major international competition was the 2016 ICF Paracanoe World Championships, Duisburg, Germany, where she finished eighth in the Women's 200 m KL1 Final. This qualified her for a quota spot on the Australian team at the 2016 Rio Paralympics. At Rio Games, she finished fifth in the Women's K1 Final.

At the 2017 ICF Canoe Sprint World Championships, Račice, Czech Republic, she won the gold medal in the Women's 200 m VL1 and finished seventh in the Women's 200 m KL1.

She is a member of the West Lakes Canoe Club and is currently being coached by Nicholas Bulmer and Emma Jager.

=== Sailing ===
Neumueller was introduced to sailing in her home town of Victor Harbor, South Australia. After requiring the use of a wheelchair, she became involved in sailability and has become a successful sailor in state and national events. She is a Sailability instructor at Goolwa Regatta Yacht Club and Adelaide Sailing Club.
