= Agnès Lacheux =

French paracanoeist

Personal information
- Born: 11 October 1974 (age 50); Orléans, France

Sport
- Country: France
- Sport: Paracanoe
- Disability: Paraplegia
- Club: Canoe Kayak Club Orléans, Blois

Agnès Lacheux (born 11 October 1974) is a French paracanoeist who competes in international level events. She became a paraplegic after a car accident in 1999.

Lacheux was once an able-bodied canoeist before her accident, she won a bronze medal in the French national championships in slalom canoe events. She took up Paralympic athletics after her accident but was unable to qualify for the Paralympic Games yet continued her passion on paracanoe and qualified for the 2016 Summer Paralympics. Lacheux finished seventh in the kayak event at the Paralympics.
