= Anita Váczi =

Hungarian paracanoeist

Personal information
- Born: 9 February 1986 (age 39); Debrecen, Hungary
- Home town: Tiszaújváros, Hungary

Sport
- Country: Hungary
- Sport: Paracanoe
- Disability: Spinal cord injury

Anita Váczi (born 9 February 1986) is a Hungarian paracanoeist who competes in international level events. Her highest achievement is reaching the final at the paracanoe at the 2016 Summer Paralympics - Women's KL1 where she finished sixth.
