= Jeanette Chippington =

British Para swimmer and Para canoeist (born 1970)

Jeanette Chippington OBE
Personal information
- Full name: Jeanette Clare Chippington
- Nationality: British
- Born: 21 April 1970 (age 56) Taplow, England
- Height: 1.62 m (5 ft 4 in)

Sport
- Country: Great Britain
- Sport: Para swimming Para canoe
- Disability class: S6 (Para swimming); KL1, VL2 (Para canoe)
Medal record
Representing Great Britain
Women's Para swimming
Paralympic Games
Gold medal – first place	1996 Atlanta	100 m freestyle S6
Gold medal – first place	1996 Atlanta	4×50 m freestyle S1-6
Silver medal – second place	1988 Seoul	100 m backstroke L4
Silver medal – second place	1996 Atlanta	50 m freestyle S6
Silver medal – second place	2000 Sydney	4×100 m medley 34pts
Silver medal – second place	2004 Athens	4×50 m freestyle 20pts
Bronze medal – third place	1992 Barcelona	4×50 m medley S1-6
Bronze medal – third place	1996 Atlanta	200 m freestyle S6
Bronze medal – third place	1996 Atlanta	4×50 m medley S1-6
Bronze medal – third place	2000 Sydney	50 m freestyle S6
Bronze medal – third place	2000 Sydney	100 m freestyle S6
Bronze medal – third place	2000 Sydney	4×50 m medley 20pts
Women's Para canoe
Paralympic Games
Gold medal – first place	2016 Rio de Janeiro	KL1
Bronze medal – third place	2020 Tokyo	VL2
Sprint World Championships
Gold medal – first place	2012 Poznań	K-1 A
Gold medal – first place	2012 Poznań	K-1 TA
Gold medal – first place	2012 Poznań	V-1 A / TA
Gold medal – first place	2012 Poznań	V-1 LTA
Gold medal – first place	2013 Duisburg	K-1 A
Gold medal – first place	2013 Duisburg	V-1 A
Gold medal – first place	2013 Duisburg	V-1 TA
Gold medal – first place	2014 Moscow	K-1 A
Gold medal – first place	2014 Moscow	V-1 A
Gold medal – first place	2015 Milan	KL1
Gold medal – first place	2017 Račice	KL1
Silver medal – second place	2016 Duisburg	KL1
Silver medal – second place	2018 Montemor-o-Velho	VL2
Bronze medal – third place	2018 Montemor-o-Velho	KL1
Bronze medal – third place	2022 Dartmouth	VL2
Bronze medal – third place	2025 Milan	VL2
European Championships
Gold medal – first place	2015 Račice	KL1
Gold medal – first place	2017 Plovdiv	KL1
Gold medal – first place	2018 Belgrade	KL1
Silver medal – second place	2018 Belgrade	VL2
Silver medal – second place	2019 Poznań	VL2
Silver medal – second place	2022 Munich	VL2
Bronze medal – third place	2019 Poznań	KL1
Marathon World Championships
Gold medal – first place	2025 Győr	KL1

Jeanette Clare Chippington (née Esling; born 21 April 1970) is a British Para swimmer and Para canoeist. Chippington has represented Great Britain at seven Paralympics, five in swimming Summer Paralympics, 1988 Seoul, 1992 Barcelona, 1996 Atlanta, Sydney 2000 and Athens 2004. Competing as a S6 classification swimmer she favoured mainly 50 m and 100m freestyle competitions. After retiring from swimming Chippington returned to disability sport, becoming a world class paracanoeist, winning gold at the 2016 Summer Paralympics and bronze at 2020 Summer Paralympics.

== Personal history ==
Chippington was born Jeanette Clare Esling in 1970 in Taplow, England. In 1982 she contracted a virus which resulted in damage to her spinal cord which in turn left her paralysed in both legs. She married in 1998, flying from her honeymoon to compete in the IPC Swimming World Championships in New Zealand. She has two children and also works as a swimming instructor and coach.

== Pars swimming career ==
Chippington started swimming on the recommendation of her physiotherapist after her illness. She entered her first major competition in 1985 and despite originally participating in all four major competitive strokes, she settled as a 50m and 100m freestyle specialist. In 1988 she made the Great Britain team for the Summer Paralympics in Seoul entering the women's 100m backstroke and freestyle L4 events. There she finished in second place in the 100m freestyle to win her first Paralympic medal. Chippington represented Great Britain four years later at the 1992 Summer Paralympics in Barcelona. There she entered six events, taking a medal in one, a bronze in the women's Women's 4x50 m Medley S1-6, alongside team mates Tara Flood, Margaret McEleny and Jane Stidever.

The 1996 Summer Paralympics were Chippington's most successful with a five medal haul. She won two gold medals, setting world records in both. In the Women's 4 x 100-metre medley relay she was reunited with McEleny and Stidver while new member Jennifer Booth was added to the last leg. The team finished in a time of 2:52.36 setting a new world record and taking gold. Her second gold medal was in the 100m freestyle S6. In the heats Jenny Newstead of New Zealand finished as fastest qualifier in a world record time of 1:23.85, while Chippington qualified third. Despite the strong competition, Chippington won the final by swimming 1:23:63 beating Newstead's short lived record in the process. She completed the Atlanta games with a silver in the 50 m freestyle S6 and two bronze medals in the 200 m freestyle S6 and 4x50 m medley relay S1-6.

The 2000 Summer Paralympics in Sydney saw Chippington add another four Paralympic medals to her tally; a silver in the Women's 4 × 100 m medley relay 34 pts and three further bronze medals. Her final Paralympics as a swimmer was the 2004 Games in Athens. Despite believing she was not good enough to qualify for the Games, Chippington still left with another medal, a silver in the 4x50m freestyle relay 20pts.

== Para canoe career ==
Chippington took up Para canoe after being nagged by a friend to try out the sport. In 2013, she won three gold medals at the ICF Canoe Sprint World Championships in Duisburg, but later decided to focus on the KL1 200m event when it was announced that only Kayaks in her disability classification would be included in the 2016 Summer Paralympics in Rio. At the 2015 ICF Canoe Sprint World Championships held in Milan, Chippington won gold in the KL1 200m, giving her a qualifying place for the 2016 Games in Rio.

Chippington was appointed Member of the Order of the British Empire (MBE) in the 2017 New Year Honours for services to canoeing and Officer of the Order of the British Empire (OBE) in the 2022 New Year Honours, also for services to canoeing.

In September 2025, she competed at the 2025 ICF Canoe Marathon World Championships and won a gold medal in the KL1 event with a time of 35:03.52. This marked the first time paracanoe was competed in marathon distances at the ICF Canoe Marathon World Championships.
