= Eleonora De Paolis =

Italian Para canoeist (born 1986)

Personal information
- Born: 27 July 1986 (age 40) Velletri, Italy

Sport
- Sport: Para canoe Para rowing
- Disability: Spinal cord injury
- Disability class: KL1
- Event: Canoe sprint
Medal record
Women's Para canoe
Representing Italy
Event	1st	2nd	3rd
World Championships	0	1	0
European Championships	0	3	0
Total	0	4	0
World Championships
Silver medal – second place	2018 Montemor-o-Velho	KL1
European Championships
Silver medal – second place	2019 Poznań	KL1
Silver medal – second place	2021 Poznań	KL1
Silver medal – second place	2022 Munich	KL1
Bronze medal – third place	2024 Szeged	KL1

Eleonora De Paolis (born 27 July 1986) is an Italian Para canoeist who won medals at senior level between World Championships and European Championships.

She acquired her disability in a car accident in 2011, she has been practicing the Paralympic sport since 16 October 2016.

== Career ==
She competed at the 2020 Summer Paralympics and 2024 Summer Paralympics.
