= KL1 (classification) =

Disability canoeing classification

The KL1 Class is for paracanoe paddlers who have very limited or no trunk function and no leg function. A KL1 class paddler is able to apply force predominantly using the arms and/or shoulders. These athletes will likely also have poor sitting balance and typically need a seat with a high backrest. Eligible paddlers typically meet one of the following:

- Impaired range of motion
- Loss of muscle strength equivalent to spinal cord injury complete at T12 level.

== Definition ==
This classification is for disability athletes. This classification is one of several classification for athletes with lower limb deficiencies, impaired muscle power and/or impaired passive range of motion. The Australian Paralympic Committee defines this classification for “limited or no trunk function and no leg function." In July 2016, the International Paralympic Committee defined this class as, "Athletes in this sports class have no or very limited trunk and no leg function."

== Performance and technique ==
While paddling, KL 3 classified sportspeople predominantly use arms and shoulders to apply force.

== History ==
The classification was created by the International Paralympic Committee (IPC). In 2003, the IPC Athletics Classification Project developed an evidence-based classification system to assist with eligibility and sports class allocation. In April 2015, the International Canoe Federation released a new classification system ahead of the 2016 Rio Paralympics. Changes were made to rename different classes of para-canoeing. Para-canoeing will be included for the first time at the Summer Paralympics in Rio 2016 as voted in by the IPC in 2010.

Formerly Known As	Currently Known As
A (Arms)	KL1
TA (Trunk and Arms)	KL2
LTA (Legs, Trunk and Arms)	KL3

For the 2016 Summer Paralympics in Rio, the International Paralympic Committee had a zero classification at the Games policy. This policy was put into place in 2014, with the goal of avoiding last minute changes in classes that would negatively impact athlete training preparations. All competitors needed to be internationally classified with their classification status confirmed prior to the Games, with exceptions to this policy being dealt with on a case-by-case basis.

== Becoming classified ==
Becoming classified as a paddler involves the examination of the impairment, pre-competition assessment of sport specific skills and in competition review. Assessment of sport specific skills includes strength and functional movement training, ergometer testing and on-water testing. Paddlers are classified based on loss of muscle strength equivalent to a spinal cord injury complete at T12 level and impaired range of motion. Each paddler receives a status for classification and further allocated a review time.

== Competitors ==
Medallists in the KL1 class at the 2015 ICF Canoe Sprint World Championships included Luis Cardoso da Silva (Brazil), Jakub Tokarz (Poland), Fernando Fernandes de Padua (Brazil), Jeanette Chippington (Great Britain), Edina Müller (Germany) and Evitlana Kupriinova (Ukraine).

== See also ==
- Paracanoe
- Paracanoeing at the 2016 Summer Paralympics
