= Edina Müller =

German wheelchair basketball player and Para canoeist (born 1983)

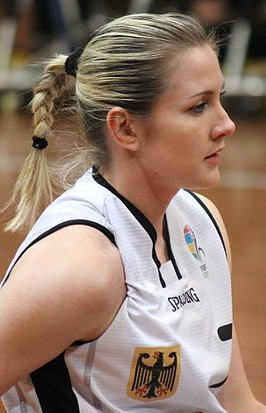
- Edina Müller

Personal information
- Born: 28 June 1983 (age 43)

Sport
- Country: Germany
- Sport: Wheelchair basketball; Para canoe
- Disability class: 2.5 (wheelchair basketball); KL1 (Para canoe)
- Event: Women's team
- College team: Illinois Fighting Illini
- Club: Hamburger SV
- Coached by: Martin Otto (wheelchair basketball); Jens Kröger (canoeing)

Achievements and titles
- Paralympic finals: 2008 Summer Paralympics; 2012 Summer Paralympics
Medal record
Representing Germany
Women's wheelchair basketball
Paralympic Games
Gold medal – first place	2012 London	Team
Silver medal – second place	2008 Beijing	Team
World Championships
Silver medal – second place	2010 Birmingham	Team
Silver medal – second place	2014 Toronto	Team
Bronze medal – third place	2006 Amsterdam	Team
Women's Para canoe
Paralympic Games
Gold medal – first place	2020 Tokyo	KL1
Silver medal – second place	2016 Rio de Janeiro	KL1
Bronze medal – third place	2024 Paris	KL1
World Championships
Gold medal – first place	2016 Duisburg	KL1
Silver medal – second place	2015 Milan	KL1
Silver medal – second place	2019 Szeged	KL1
Silver medal – second place	2021 Copenhagen	KL1
Bronze medal – third place	2024 Szeged	KL1
European Championships
Gold medal – first place	2016 Moscow	KL1
Gold medal – first place	2022 Munich	KL1
Silver medal – second place	2015 Račice	KL1
Silver medal – second place	2024 Szeged	KL1
Bronze medal – third place	2017 Plovdiv	KL1
Bronze medal – third place	2021 Poznań	KL1
Bronze medal – third place	2025 Racice	VL2

Edina Müller (born 28 June 1983) is a German 2.5 point wheelchair basketball player and KL1 Para canoeist. She played for ASV Bonn in the German wheelchair basketball league, and for the national team. As part of the German women's national wheelchair basketball team, she won bronze at the 2006 World Cup in Amsterdam, won three time European champions (in 2007, 2009, 2011), a silver medal at the 2008 Summer Paralympics in Beijing, and a gold medal at the 2012 Summer Paralympics in London. The team was voted 2008 Team of the Year in disabled sports, and Horst Köhler presented it with Germany's highest sports award, the Silbernes Lorbeerblatt (Silver Laurel Leaf). President Joachim Gauck awarded the team a second Silver Leaf after it won the gold medal at the 2012 Summer Paralympics. Müller was also a two-time U.S. champion (2006–2008) with her college team Illinois Fighting Illini at the University of Illinois at Urbana-Champaign, and helped ASV Bonn win the European Cup (Willi Brinkmann Cup) in Valladolid, Spain in 2009. From 2011 to 2014 she played for Hamburger SV.

Müller retired from wheelchair basketball after the 2014 Women's World Wheelchair Basketball Championship in Toronto, at which she won silver, and took up canoeing. On 24 May 2015, she won silver in the women's KL1 200 m race at the 2015 ICF Canoe Sprint World Cup in Duisburg. On 19 May 2016, she won gold in the event at the 2016 ICF Canoe Sprint World Cup in Duisburg.

== Biography ==
Edina Müller was born on 28 June 1983, and raised in the Rhineland town of Brühl. In 2000, at the age of 16, she was playing volleyball, and felt pain in her back. A doctor straightened her back, but within two hours she lost feeling in her legs. She was rushed to hospital where a blood clot was discovered. Diagnosed with paraplegia, she spent the next four months in hospital. She had to repeat Year 10 at Max Ernst Gymnasium, but graduated in 2003. Although she began using a wheelchair, she longed to return to playing sport, and initially tried sitting volleyball. She then took up wheelchair tennis, winning the Hungarian Open in 2005, but ultimately switched to wheelchair basketball, playing for ASV Bonn. In 2005, she was invited to attend a German national team training camp by its coach, Holger Glinicki. The following year she made the national team and won bronze at the World Championships in Amsterdam.

Müller's mentor and professor at the University of Cologne, Professor Dr Horst Strohkendl, advised her to pursue her sporting career in the United States. She attended a one-week basketball camp in Illinois in 2006, where she was noticed by Michael Frogley, the coach of the Canadian men's national wheelchair basketball team and the Illinois Fighting Illini college team at the University of Illinois at Urbana-Champaign. In both years they won the National Championship with the team. During the semester break, she travelled with the German women's national team for tournaments and preparation camps. In 2007, the German women became European champions before a home crowd at Wetzlar.

Müller graduated from the University of Illinois in 2008 with a Bachelor of Science degree in kinesiology, and moved back to Germany, where she helped ASV Bonn win the European Cup (Willi Brinkmann Cup) in Valladolid, Spain in 2009. In 2011, she started playing for Hamburger SV. Her American degree was accepted in Germany, and she qualified as a rehabilitation therapist at BG Trauma Hospital in Hamburg-Boberg. She worked with paraplegic patients, helping them become wheelchair mobile, by strengthening the chest and upper arm muscles. "It makes a difference," she says "that the therapist also cannot walk."

In September 2008, Müller participated in the 2008 Summer Paralympics in Beijing, but Germany was beaten in the gold medal game by the team the United States, which contained a number of former teammates and opponents from the University of Illinois. The German team took home Paralympic silver medals instead. After the Paralympics, the team's performance was considered impressive enough for it to be named the national "Team of the Year", and it received the Silver Laurel Leaf, Germany's highest sporting honour, from German President Horst Koehler. Brühl honoured her with an entry in its Golden Book.

Müller helped the national team defend their European Championship title with the national team in Stoke Mandeville, England in 2009. They hoped for a rematch against the United States at the 2012 Summer Paralympic Games in London, but instead faced the team that had beaten the Americans, the Australia women's national wheelchair basketball team, which included former Illinois teammates Shelley Chaplin and Bridie Kean. They defeated the Australians in front of a crowd of over 12,000 to win the gold medal, They were awarded another Silver Laurel Leaf by President Joachim Gauck in November 2012, and were again named Team of the Year for 2012.

Müller retired from wheelchair basketball after the 2014 Women's World Wheelchair Basketball Championship in Toronto, at which she won silver. She then took up canoeing, training at the Hamburg Canoe Club. "From basketball", she said "I learned to always have the sight set for a big goal. If something doesn’t turn out how it should, it’s not the end of the world. But it always helps to have a goal set in front of you." According to her coach, Jens Kröger, "It’s easy to motivate her. She’s fighting to reach a training target. She never gives up.” Her hard work paid off. Not only did she earn national team selection, but on 24 May 2105 she won silver in the women's KL1 200 m race at the 2015 ICF Canoe Sprint World Cup in Duisburg in a personal best time of 59.981 seconds, her first time below the one-minute mark. On 19 May 2016 at the 2016 ICF Canoe Sprint World Cup in Duisburg, she went one better, winning gold despite capsizing her canoe that morning during warm up.

Sydney July 2012
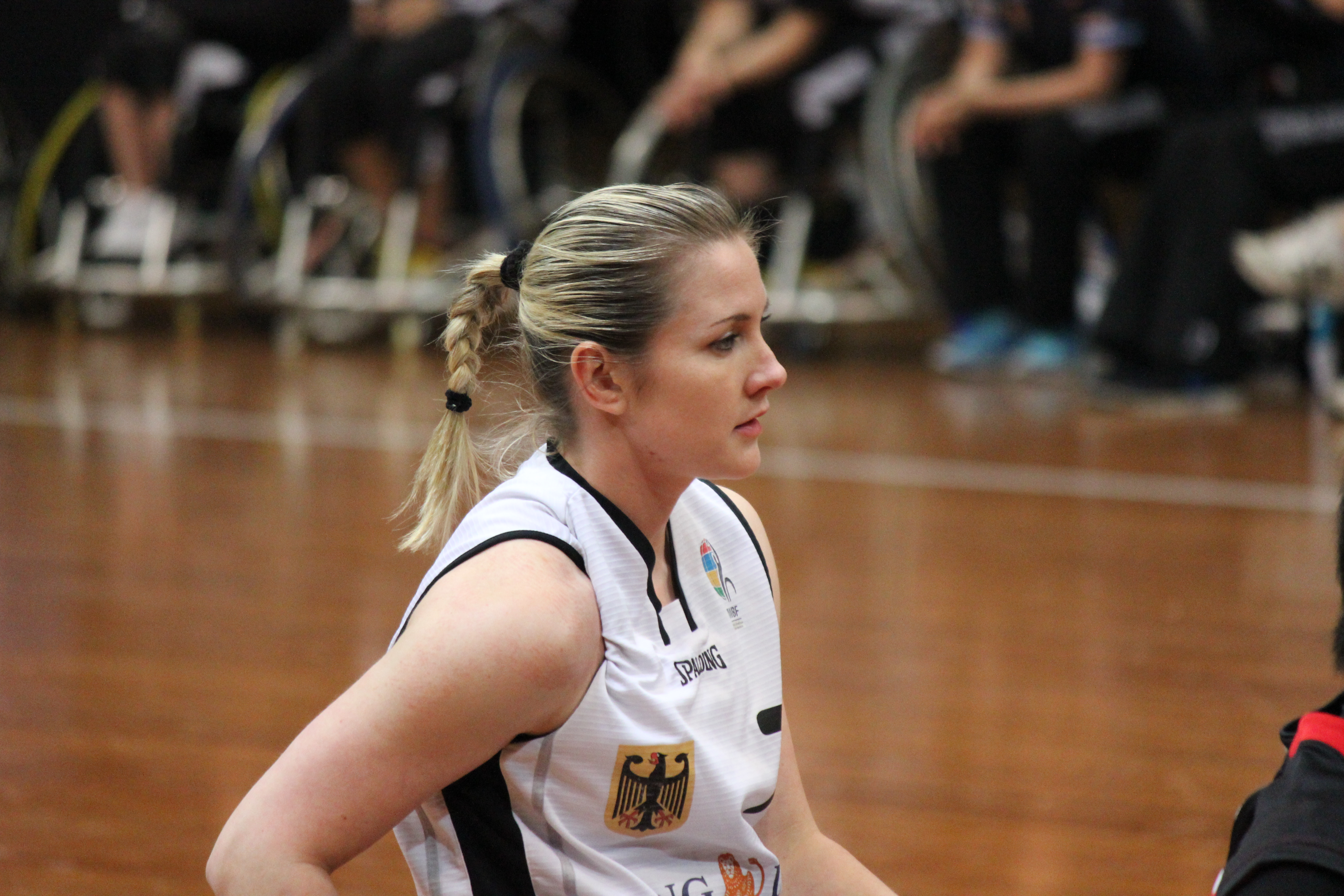

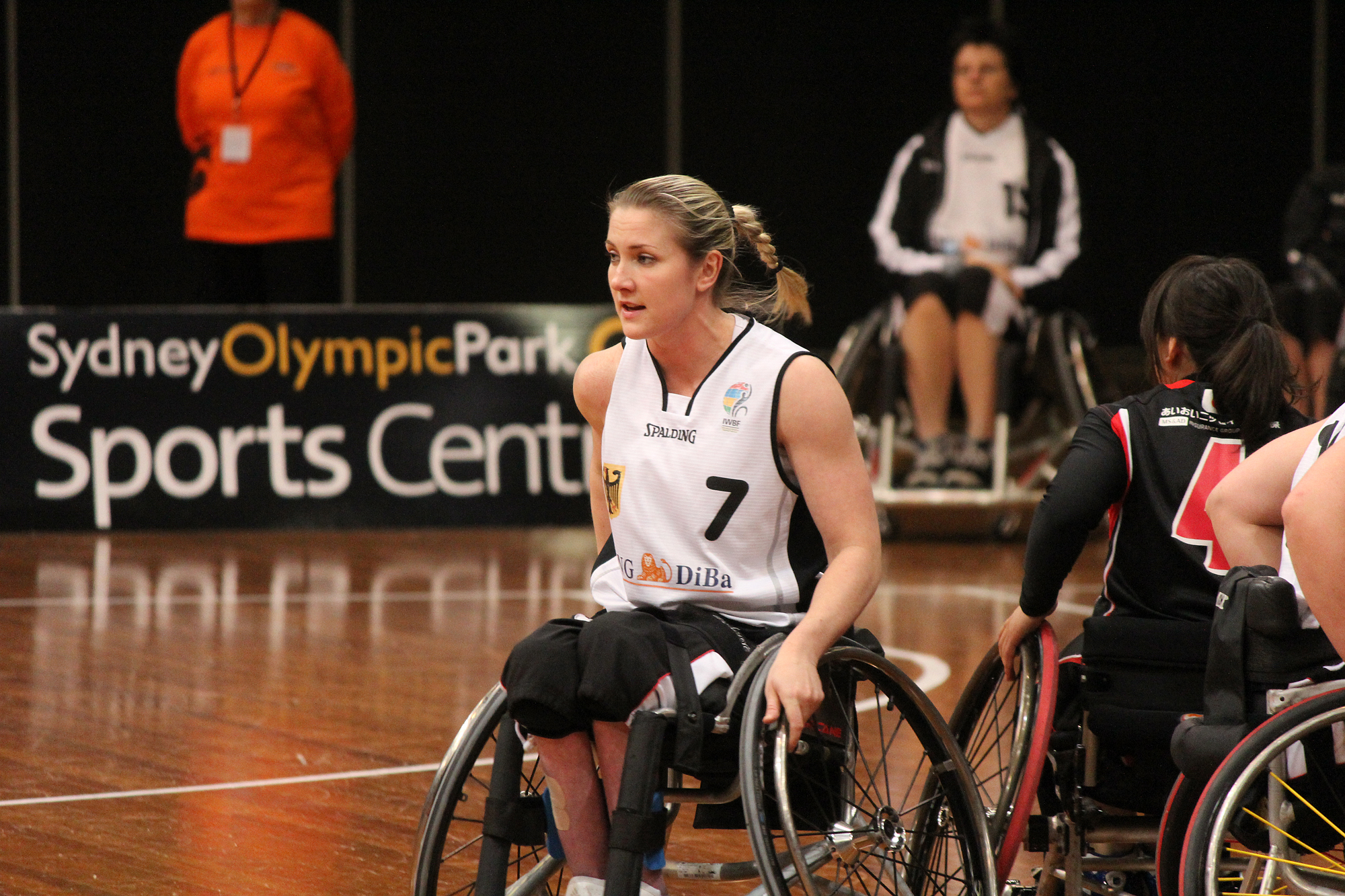

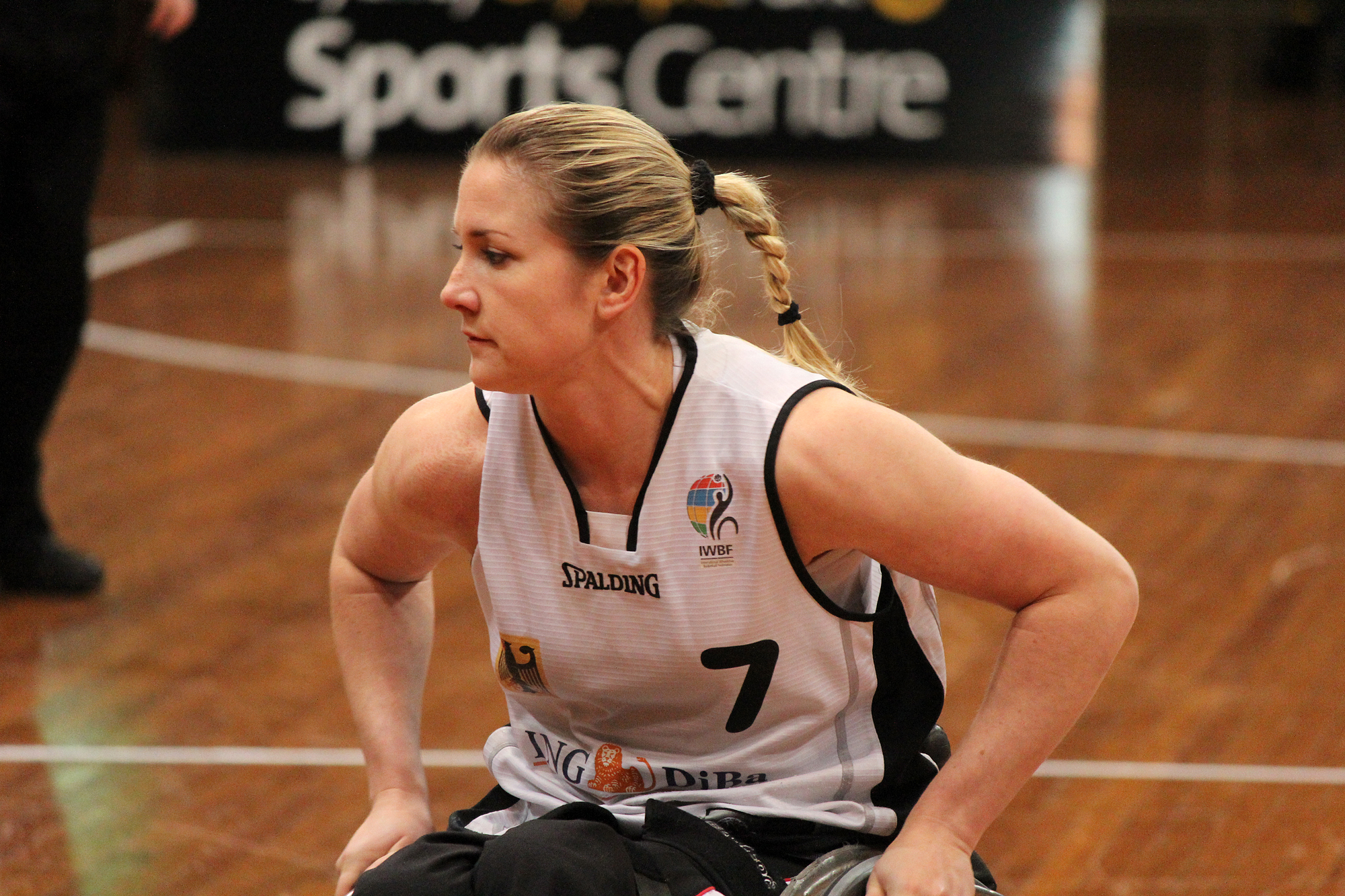

== Achievements ==
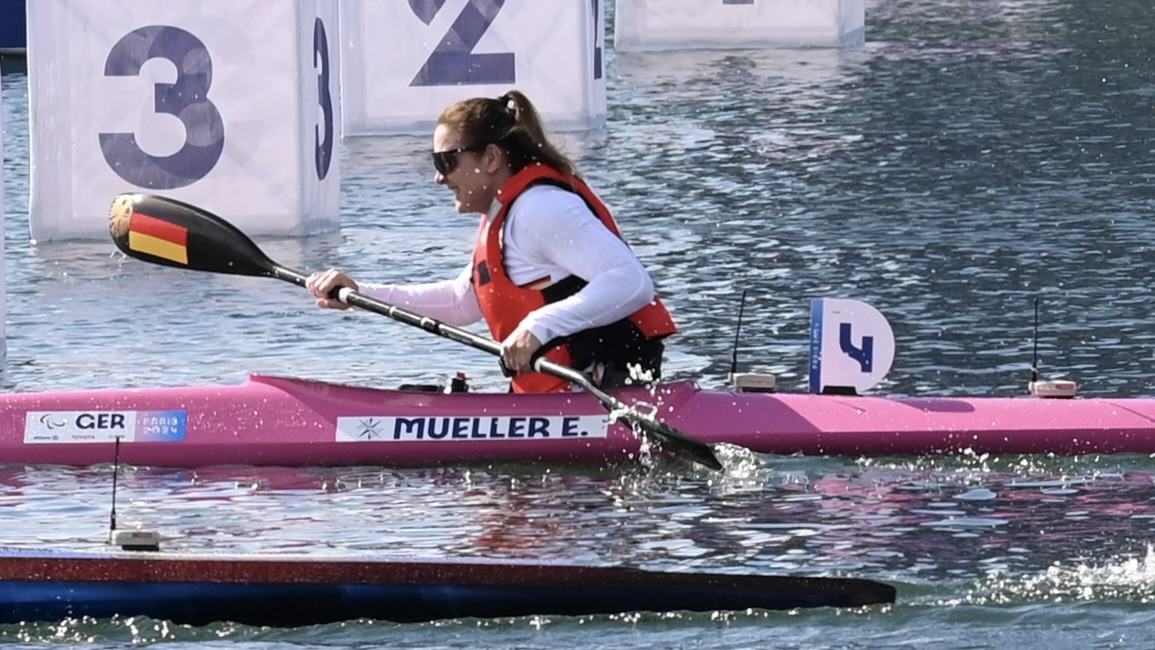
In action at the 2024 Summer Paralympics in Paris

- 2006: Bronze World Championship (Amsterdam, Netherlands)
- 2007: Gold National Championship (Warm Springs, United States)
- 2007: Gold European Championship (Wetzlar, Germany)
- 2008: Gold National Championship (Champaign, United States)
- 2008: Silver Paralympics (Beijing, China)
- 2009: Gold European Championship (Stoke Mandeville, Great Britain)
- 2010: Silver World Championships (Birmingham, Great Britain)
- 2011: Gold European Championships (Nazareth, Israel)
- 2012: Gold Paralympic Games (London, England)
- 2013: Silver European Championships (Frankfurt, Germany)
- 2014: Silver at the World Championships (Toronto, Canada)
- 2015: Silver at the ICF Canoe Sprint World Cup (Duisburg, Germany)
- 2016: Gold at the ICF Canoe Sprint World Cup (Duisburg, Germany)

== Awards ==
- 2008: Team of the Year
- 2008: Silver Laurel Leaf
- 2009: Entry in the Golden Book of the city of Brühl
- 2012: Team of the Year
- 2012: Silver Laurel Leaf
- 2013: Hamburg Sportswoman of the Year
