= Weightlifting at the 1972 Summer Paralympics =

Weightlifting at the IV Paralympic Games
- Paralympic Weightlifting
- Competitors: 46 from 18 nations

Weightlifting at the 1972 Summer Paralympics consisted of six events for men.

== Participating nations ==
There were 46 male competitors representing 18 nations.

- Australia (3)
- Belgium (3)
- Denmark (1)
- Finland (2)
- France (6)
- Great Britain (3)
- India (1)
- Israel (2)
- Jamaica (1)
- Japan (3)
- Malaysia (3)
- Mexico (2)
- Norway (1)
- Poland (1)
- Sweden (4)
- Switzerland (3)
- United States (6)
- West Germany (1)

== Medal summary ==
=== Medal table ===
There were 18 medal winners representing 10 nations.

Rank	Nation	Gold	Silver	Bronze	Total
1	France (FRA)	2	1	2	5
2	United States (USA)	1	3	1	5
3	Australia (AUS)	1	0	0	1
3	Great Britain (GBR)	1	0	0	1
3	Jamaica (JAM)	1	0	0	1
6	Norway (NOR)	0	1	0	1
6	Sweden (SWE)	0	1	0	1
8	Israel (ISR)	0	0	1	1
8	Poland (POL)	0	0	1	1
8	Switzerland (SUI)	0	0	1	1
Totals (10 entries)		6	6	6	18

=== Men's events ===
Event	Gold	Silver	Bronze
Men's light featherweight	Dumont; France	Martin; United States	Jan Was; Poland
Men's featherweight	Pearson; Jamaica	Benny Nilsson; Sweden	Shmuel Haimovitz; Israel
Men's lightweight	Alex Eguers; France	Vidar Johnsen; Norway	Ernst Michel; Switzerland
Men's middleweight	Edward Coyle; United States	René Brifoulliere; France	Richard Tauber; United States
Men's light heavyweight	Ralph Rowe; Great Britain	Patton; United States	Michel Allorge; France
Men's heavyweight	Vic Renalson; Australia	Jon Brown; United States	Gillet; France
