= Athletics at the 1972 Summer Paralympics – Men's 60 metres wheelchair 1B =

Paralympics sport event

Men's 60 m wheelchair 1B at the IV Paralympic Games
- Paralympic Athletics
- Competitors: 27 from 18 nations

Medalists
1st place, gold medalist(s)		Baumgartner	West Germany
2nd place, silver medalist(s)		Kazumi Ohashi	Japan
3rd place, bronze medalist(s)		R. Zeyher	West Germany

The Men's 60 m wheelchair 1B was one of the events held in Athletics at the 1972 Summer Paralympics in Heidelberg.

There were 27 competitors in the heat; 5 made it into the final.

Baumgartner of West Germany won the gold medal.

== Results ==
=== Heats ===
Rank	Athlete	Time
1	R. Zeyher (FRG)	21.1
2	Kazumi Ohashi (JPN)	21.4
3	Baumgartner (FRG)	21.8
4	Walter Sailer (AUT)	22.3
5	Julius Duval (USA)	23.0
6	Robert Ocvirk (USA)	23.4
7	McGann (GBR)	23.6
8	Speiser (AUT)	24.6
9	Rosenbaum (USA)	25.0
10	Tullius (FRG)	25.7
11	Simunek (TCH)	26.0
12	Tom Parker (CAN)	26.0
13	Soijkerbuik (NED)	26.9
14	Mayerhofer (AUT)	27.0
15	Daniel Jeannin (FRA)	27.2
16	Cokelj (YUG)	27.7
17	Cerkvenik (YUG)	28.4
18	Maeki (FIN)	29.2
19	Michel de Kemp (BEL)	31.7
20	Dario Bandinelli (ITA)	32.2
21	Beat Thöni (SUI)	33.9
22	John Sands (BAH)	34.8
23	R. Muise (CAN)	37.8
24	Sin Nam Song (KOR)	40.7
25	Keith McCormick (NZL)	41.8
26	Raúl Di Paolo (ARG)	51.3
27	Dany Buchs (SUI)	59.3

=== Final ===
Rank	Athlete	Time
1st place, gold medalist(s)	Baumgartner (FRG)	19.0
2nd place, silver medalist(s)	Kazumi Ohashi (JPN)	19.5
3rd place, bronze medalist(s)	R. Zeyher (FRG)	19.9
4	Walter Sailer (AUT)	21.4
5	Julius Duval (USA)	23.3'
