= Paralympic results index =

This Paralympic Games results index is a list of links to articles containing results of each Paralympic sport at the Summer Paralympics and Winter Paralympics. Years not appearing are those when the event was not held. Years in italics mean it was a demonstration sport.

== Summer Paralympics ==
The Summer Paralympic Games have been held every four years since 1960.

- 1960
- 1964
- 1968
- 1972
- 1976
- 1980
- 1984
- 1988
- 1992
- 1996
- 2000
- 2004
- 2008
- 2012
- 2016
- 2020
- 2024
- 2028

=== Archery ===
- 1960
- 1964
- 1968
- 1972
- 1976
- 1980
- 1984
- 1988
- 1992
- 1996
- 2000
- 2004
- 2008
- 2012
- 2016
- 2020

=== Athletics ===
- 1960
- 1964
- 1968
- 1972
- 1976
- 1980
- 1984
- 1988
- 1992
- 1996
- 2000
- 2004
- 2008
- 2012
- 2016
- 2020

=== Boccia ===
- 1984
- 1988
- 1992
- 1996
- 2000
- 2004
- 2008
- 2012
- 2016
- 2020

=== Football 5-a-side ===
- 2004
- 2008
- 2012
- 2016
- 2020

=== Football 7-a-side ===
- 1984
- 1988
- 1992
- 1996
- 2000
- 2004
- 2008
- 2012
- 2016
- 2020

=== Cycling ===
- 1984
- 1988
- 1992
- 1996
- 2000
- 2004
- 2008
- 2012
- 2016
- 2020

=== Dartchery ===
- 1960
- 1964
- 1968
- 1972
- 1976
- 1980

=== Equestrian ===
- 1984
- 1996
- 2000
- 2004
- 2008
- 2012
- 2016
- 2020

=== Goalball ===
- 1972
- 1976
- 1980
- 1984
- 1988
- 1992
- 1996
- 2000
- 2004
- 2008
- 2012
- 2016
- 2020

=== Judo ===
- 1988
- 1992
- 1996
- 2000
- 2004
- 2008
- 2012
- 2016
- 2020

=== Lawn bowls ===
Lawn bowls was on the program from 1968 to 1988, and in 1996.

- 1968
- 1972
- 1976
- 1980
- 1984
- 1988
- 1996

=== Paracanoe ===
- 2016
- 2020

=== Paratriathlon ===
- 2016
- 2020

=== Powerlifting ===
- 1984
- 1988
- 1992
- 1996
- 2000
- 2004
- 2008
- 2012
- 2016
- 2020

=== Rowing ===
- 2008
- 2012
- 2016
- 2020

=== Sailing ===
- 1996
- 2000
- 2004
- 2008
- 2012
- 2016
- 2020

=== Shooting ===
- 1976
- 1980
- 1984
- 1988
- 1992
- 1996
- 2000
- 2004
- 2008
- 2012
- 2016
- 2020

=== Snooker ===
- 1960
- 1964
- 1968
- 1972
- 1976
- 1984
- 1988

=== Swimming ===
- 1960
- 1964
- 1968
- 1972
- 1976
- 1980
- 1984
- 1988
- 1992
- 1996
- 2000
- 2004
- 2008
- 2012
- 2016
- 2020

=== Table tennis ===
- 1960
- 1964
- 1968
- 1972
- 1976
- 1980
- 1984
- 1988
- 1992
- 1996
- 2000
- 2004
- 2008
- 2012
- 2016
- 2020

=== Volleyball ===
- 1976
- 1980
- 1984
- 1988
- 1992
- 1996
- 2000
- 2004
- 2008
- 2012
- 2016
- 2020

=== Weightlifting ===
- 1964
- 1968
- 1972
- 1976
- 1980
- 1984
- 1988
- 1992

=== Wheelchair basketball ===
- 1960
- 1964
- 1968
- 1972
- 1976
- 1980
- 1984
- 1988
- 1992
- 1996
- 2000
- 2004
- 2008
- 2012
- 2016
- 2020

=== Wheelchair fencing ===
- 1960
- 1964
- 1968
- 1972
- 1976
- 1980
- 1984
- 1988
- 1992
- 1996
- 2000
- 2004
- 2008
- 2012
- 2016
- 2020

=== Wheelchair rugby ===
- 1996
- 2000
- 2004
- 2008
- 2012
- 2016
- 2020

=== Wheelchair tennis ===
- 1988
- 1992
- 1996
- 2000
- 2004
- 2008
- 2012
- 2016
- 2020

=== Wrestling ===
Wrestling was contested in 1980 and 1984.

- 1980
- 1984

== Winter Paralympics ==
The Winter Paralympic Games were held every four years from 1976 to 1992, and then every four years since 1994.

- 1976
- 1980
- 1984
- 1988
- 1992
- 1994
- 1998
- 2002
- 2006
- 2010
- 2014
- 2018
- 2022
- 2026

=== Alpine skiing ===
- 1976
- 1980
- 1984
- 1988
- 1992
- 1994
- 1998
- 2002
- 2006
- 2010
- 2014
- 2018

=== Ice sledge hockey ===
- 1994
- 1998
- 2002
- 2006
- 2010
- 2014
- 2018

=== Ice sledge speed racing ===
- 1980
- 1984
- 1988
- 1994
- 1998

=== Nordic skiing ===
==== Biathlon ====
- 1988
- 1992
- 1994
- 1998
- 2002
- 2006
- 2010
- 2014
- 2018

==== Cross-country skiing ====
- 1976
- 1980
- 1984
- 1988
- 1992
- 1994
- 1998
- 2002
- 2006
- 2010
- 2014
- 2018

=== Snowboarding ===
- 2014
- 2018

=== Wheelchair curling ===
- 2006
- 2010
- 2014
- 2018

== See also ==
- Olympic results index
