= Swimming at the 1972 Summer Paralympics =

Swimming at the IV Paralympic Games
- Paralympic Swimming pictogram

Swimming at the 1972 Summer Paralympics consisted of 56 events, 28 for men and 28 for women.

== Medal summary ==
=== Medal table ===
| Rank | Nation | Gold | Silver | Bronze | Total |
|---|---|---|---|---|---|
| 1 | Netherlands (NED) | 11 | 10 | 6 | 27 |
| 2 | Poland (POL) | 11 | 10 | 2 | 23 |
| 3 | South Africa (RSA) | 8 | 3 | 7 | 18 |
| 4 | France (FRA) | 5 | 1 | 1 | 7 |
| 5 | Israel (ISR) | 4 | 3 | 2 | 9 |
| 6 | Sweden (SWE) | 4 | 1 | 3 | 8 |
| 7 | Jamaica (JAM) | 3 | 2 | 3 | 8 |
| 8 | Rhodesia (RHO) | 2 | 4 | 3 | 9 |
| 9 | Great Britain (GBR) | 2 | 3 | 5 | 10 |
| 10 | Australia (AUS) | 1 | 3 | 5 | 9 |
| 10 | United States (USA) | 1 | 3 | 5 | 9 |
| 12 | West Germany (FRG) | 1 | 3 | 4 | 8 |
| 13 | Canada (CAN) | 1 | 0 | 1 | 2 |
| 14 | India (IND) | 1 | 0 | 0 | 1 |
| 14 | Kenya (KEN) | 1 | 0 | 0 | 1 |
| 16 | Spain (ESP) | 0 | 4 | 0 | 4 |
| 17 | Norway (NOR) | 0 | 3 | 1 | 4 |
| 18 | Finland (FIN) | 0 | 2 | 1 | 3 |
| 19 | Argentina (ARG) | 0 | 0 | 1 | 1 |
| 19 | Ireland (IRL) | 0 | 0 | 1 | 1 |
| 19 | New Zealand (NZL) | 0 | 0 | 1 | 1 |
| Totals (21 entries) | | 56 | 55 | 52 | 163 |

=== Participating nations ===
- Argentina (7)
- Australia (7)
- Austria (9)
- Belgium (2)
- Brazil (1)
- Canada (14)
- Czechoslovakia (3)
- Denmark (5)
- Finland (10)
- France (19)
- Great Britain (23)
- Hong Kong (3)
- India (3)
- Ireland (4)
- Israel (15)
- Italy (4)
- Jamaica (8)
- Japan (1)
- Kenya (1)
- Mexico (1)
- Netherlands (15)
- New Zealand (5)
- Norway (11)
- Peru (1)
- Poland (14)
- Rhodesia (12)
- South Africa (9)
- Spain (14)
- Sweden (10)
- Switzerland (6)
- United States (20)
- West Germany (19)
- Yugoslavia (3)

=== Men's events ===
| Event | Gold | Silver | Bronze |
|---|---|---|---|
| 25 m freestyle 1A | Claude Raffin; France | Alan West; Great Britain | None |
| 25 m freestyle 1B | Daniel Jeannin; France | Robert Ockvirk; United States | David Holland; Rhodesia |
| 25 m freestyle 2 | John Britton; Kenya | Mohamed Benamar; France | Gerrit Pomp; Netherlands |
| 50 m freestyle 3 | Murlikant Petkar; India | Andrzej Seremak; Poland | Olbrich; West Germany |
| 50 m freestyle 4 | M. Vanderriet; South Africa | Beltrand de Five Pranger; Spain | Foust; United States |
| 100 m freestyle 5 | Bosch; South Africa | Arieh Rubin; Israel | Robert Morrison; Australia |
| 100 m freestyle 6 | Harry Lamberts; Netherlands | Francisco Benítez; Spain | Zenon Sokol; Poland |
| 25 m backstroke 1A | Alan West; Great Britain | Matti Launonen; Finland | Hans Lubbering; West Germany |
| 25 m backstroke 1B | Daniel Jeannin; France | Robert Ockvirk; United States | Patrick Reid; Jamaica |
| 25 m backstroke 2 | Eric Boulter; Australia | Gerrit Pomp; Netherlands | Risto Liuska; Finland |
| 50 m backstroke 3 | Shlomo Finkelstein; Israel | Andrzej Seremak; Poland | Richard Bates; Great Britain |
| 50 m backstroke 4 | Stanislaw Mosurek; Poland | Andrew James Scott; Rhodesia | Moshe Levy; Israel |
| 100 m backstroke 5 | Ryszard Machowczyk; Poland | Bosch; South Africa | Kevin English; Rhodesia |
| 100 m backstroke 6 | Nilsson; Sweden | Francisco Benítez; Spain | George Simpson; Great Britain |
| 25 m breaststroke 1A | Claude Raffin; France | Alan West; Great Britain | None |
| 25 m breaststroke 1B | Patrick Reid; Jamaica | Robert Ockvirk; United States | R. Rosenbaum; United States |
| 25 m breaststroke 2 | David Ellis; Great Britain | Risto Liuska; Finland | Gerrit Pomp; Netherlands |
| 50 m breaststroke 3 | Andrzej Seremak; Poland | William Thornton; Great Britain | Griggs; United States |
| 50 m breaststroke 4 | M. Vanderriet; South Africa | Harald Gunnerup; Norway | Andrew James Scott; Rhodesia |
| 100 m breaststroke 5 | Arieh Rubin; Israel | Ryszard Machowczyk; Poland | Mieczyslaw Sobczak; Poland |
| 100 m breaststroke 6 | Zenon Sokol; Poland | Harry Lamberts; Netherlands | George Simpson; Great Britain |
| 75 m individual medley 2 | Wasnock; Canada | Eric Boulter; Australia | None |
| 75 m individual medley 3 | Shlomo Finkelstein; Israel | Olbrich; West Germany | W. Thornton; Great Britain |
| 75 m individual medley 4 | Andrew James Scott; Rhodesia | Beltrand de Five Pranger; Spain | M. Vanderriet; South Africa |
| 150 m individual medley 5 | Ryszard Machowczyk; Poland | Arieh Rubin; Israel | Robert Morrison; Australia |
| 150 m individual medley 6 | Nilsson; Sweden | Harry Lamberts; Netherlands | Alcock; South Africa |
| 3×50 m medley relay 2–4 | Israel (ISR): Moshe Levy; Joseph Wengier; Moshe Mousai | Poland (POL): Stanisław Mosurek; Andrzej Seremak; Mirosław Deręgowski | United States (USA) |
| 3×100 m medley relay 5–6 | Poland (POL): Ryszard Machowczyk; Zenon Sokół; Mieczysław Sobczak | South Africa (RSA) | Sweden (SWE) |

=== Women's events ===
| Event | Gold | Silver | Bronze |
|---|---|---|---|
| 25 m freestyle 1A | Sandra James; Rhodesia | None | None |
| 25 m freestyle 1B | Delphine van Opdorp-Ariens Kappers; Netherlands | Eileen Robertson; Rhodesia | Tina Morgan; New Zealand |
| 25 m freestyle 2 | Schyff; South Africa | Pam Foley; Australia | Sharon Myers; United States |
| 50 m freestyle 3 | Anna Pogorzelska; Poland | Netty van der Krieke; Netherlands | M. Schaefer; South Africa |
| 50 m freestyle 4 | Alina Wojtowicz; Poland | Bente Gronli; Norway | Pauline English; Australia |
| 100 m freestyle 5 | Grazyna Haffke; Poland | Mary Kuivenhoven; Netherlands | Rachel Tassa; Israel |
| 100 m freestyle 6 | Ingrid van der Benden; Netherlands | Barbara Kopycka; Poland | Louw; South Africa |
| 25 m backstroke 1A | Karen Donaldson; United States | Mayerhofer; West Germany | Demerakas; Canada |
| 25 m backstroke 1B | Tournier; France | Liebrecht; West Germany | Delphine van Opdorp-Ariens Kappers; Netherlands |
| 25 m backstroke 2 | Henny Hilberink; Netherlands | Quirien Jonker; Netherlands | D. Weber; West Germany |
| 50 m backstroke 3 | Anna Pogorzelska; Poland | Netty van der Krieke; Netherlands | Nella McPherson; Jamaica |
| 50 m backstroke 4 | Le Roux; South Africa | M. Tufuesson; Sweden | Bente Gronli; Norway |
| 100 m backstroke 5 | Marijke Ruiter; Netherlands | Grazyna Haffke; Poland | de Baker; Netherlands |
| 100 m backstroke 6 | Barbara Kopycka; Poland | Leone Williams; Jamaica | Kerstin Wiksén; Sweden |
| 25 m breaststroke 1A | Mayerhofer; West Germany | Sandra James; Rhodesia | Richetti; Argentina |
| 25 m breaststroke 1B | Delphine van Opdorp-Ariens Kappers; Netherlands | Eileen Robertson; Rhodesia | White; Ireland |
| 25 m breaststroke 2 | Schyff; South Africa | Mullings; Jamaica | D. Weber; West Germany |
| 50 m breaststroke 3 | Nella McPherson; Jamaica | Anna Pogorzelska; Poland | M. Schaefer; South Africa |
| 50 m breaststroke 4 | M. Tufuesson; Sweden | Ora Goldstein; Israel | Sonja Graveland; Netherlands |
| 100 m breaststroke 5 | Marijke Ruiter; Netherlands | Mary Kuivenhoven; Netherlands | Galeon; France |
| 100 m breaststroke 6 | Ingrid van der Benden; Netherlands | Louw; South Africa | Kerstin Wiksén; Sweden |
| 75 m individual medley 2 | Schyff; South Africa | Pam Foley; Australia | Mullings; Jamaica |
| 75 m individual medley 3 | Nella McPherson; Jamaica | Netty van der Krieke; Netherlands | Dukelow; Great Britain |
| 75 m individual medley 4 | M. Tufuesson; Sweden | Bente Gronli; Norway | Pauline English; Australia |
| 150 m individual medley 5 | Marijke Ruiter; Netherlands | Grazyna Haffke; Poland | Mary Kuivenhoven; Netherlands |
| 150 m individual medley 6 | Ingrid van der Benden; Netherlands | Barbara Kopycka; Poland | Louw; South Africa |
| 3×50 m medley relay 2–4 | South Africa (RSA) | Netherlands (NED); Quirien Jonker; Sonja Graveland; Netty van der Krieke | Australia (AUS) |
| 3×100 m medley relay 5–6 | Netherlands (NED); Mary Kuivenhoven; Ingrid van der Benden; Marijke Ruiter | Poland (POL) | South Africa (RSA) |
