= Athletics at the 1972 Summer Paralympics – Men's pentathlon 4 =

Men's pentathlon 4 at the IV Paralympic Games
- Paralympic Athletics
- Competitors: 14 from 9 nations

Medalists
1st place, gold medalist(s)		Eugene Reimer	Canada
2nd place, silver medalist(s)		W. Flach	West Germany
3rd place, bronze medalist(s)		Reno Levis	United States

The Men's pentathlon 4 was one of the events held in Athletics at the 1972 Summer Paralympics in Heidelberg.

There were 14 competitors in the event.

Eugene Reimer of Canada won the gold medal.

== Results ==
=== Final ===
Rank	Athlete	Points
1st place, gold medalist(s)	Eugene Reimer (CAN)	5141
2nd place, silver medalist(s)	W. Flach (FRG)	5140
3rd place, bronze medalist(s)	Reno Levis (USA)	4958
4	Spilger (FRG)	4841
5	Nolting (FRG)	4836
6	Johann Schuhbauer (FRG)	4710
7	Taiso Kainu (FIN)	4676
8	Taylor (GBR)	4671
9	Kantonen (FIN)	4228
10	Walter Dann (CAN)	3790
11	Lenhart (TCH)	3296
12	Leslie Manson-Bishop (RHO)	3285
13	Yasuhiro Fujikawa (JPN)	2712
14	Moshe Feld (ISR)	2302
