= Athletics at the 1972 Summer Paralympics – Women's 60 metres wheelchair 2 =

Women's 60 m wheelchair 2 at the IV Paralympic Games
- Paralympic Athletics
- Competitors: 9 from 8 nations

Medalists
1st place, gold medalist(s)		Sitar	Yugoslavia
2nd place, silver medalist(s)		Kathleen Fagan	Ireland
3rd place, bronze medalist(s)		Krystyna Owczarczyk	Poland

The Women's 60 m wheelchair 2 was one of the events held in Athletics at the 1972 Summer Paralympics in Heidelberg.

There were 9 competitors in the heat; 5 made it into the final.

Sitar of Yugoslavia won the gold medal.

== Results ==
=== Heats ===
Rank	Athlete	Time
1	Kathleen Fagan (IRL)	19.4
2	Sitar (YUG)	19.6
3	Yamahata (JPN)	20.4
4	Sharon Myers (USA)	21.0
5	Krystyna Owczarczyk (POL)	21.4
6	Mullings (JAM)	22.5
7	Lucanova (TCH)	22.9
8	Bonefas (FRG)	32.4
9	Umeda (JPN)	24.0

=== Final ===
Rank	Athlete	Time
1st place, gold medalist(s)	Sitar (YUG)	18.0
2nd place, silver medalist(s)	Kathleen Fagan (IRL)	18.4
3rd place, bronze medalist(s)	Krystyna Owczarczyk (POL)	18.5
4	Yamahata (JPN)	20.3
5	Tatyana Susteric (YUG)	20.5
