= Table tennis at the 1972 Summer Paralympics =

Table tennis at the IV Paralympic Games
- Paralympic Table tennis

Table tennis at the 1972 Summer Paralympics consisted of nineteen events, ten for men and nine for women.

== Medal table ==
Rank	Nation	Gold	Silver	Bronze	Total
1	West Germany (FRG)	4	3	1	8
2	Austria (AUT)	4	1	2	7
3	South Korea (KOR)	3	0	0	3
4	Great Britain (GBR)	2	4	9	15
5	Switzerland (SUI)	2	1	3	6
6	Netherlands (NED)	2	0	3	5
7	Italy (ITA)	1	1	1	3
8	Israel (ISR)	1	0	2	3
9	Sweden (SWE)	0	3	2	5
10	France (FRA)	0	1	4	5
10	United States (USA)	0	1	4	5
12	Norway (NOR)	0	1	2	3
13	Hong Kong (HKG)	0	1	1	2
14	Belgium (BEL)	0	1	0	1
14	Ireland (IRL)	0	1	0	1
16	Canada (CAN)	0	0	3	3
Totals (16 entries)		19	19	37	75

== Medal summary ==
=== Men's events ===
Event	Gold	Silver	Bronze
Singles 1A	Hans Rosenast; Switzerland	Nilsson; Sweden	Rolf Zumkehr; Switzerland
Singles 1A	Hans Rosenast; Switzerland	Nilsson; Sweden	Rainer Küschall; Switzerland
Singles 1B	Sin Nam Song; South Korea	Daniel Jeannin; France	Stephen Bradshaw; Great Britain
Singles 1B	Sin Nam Song; South Korea	Daniel Jeannin; France	Paul Suijkerbuijk; Netherlands
Singles 2	Tae Am Choi; South Korea	Leslie Lam; Hong Kong	Giuseppe Trieste; Italy
Singles 2	Tae Am Choi; South Korea	Leslie Lam; Hong Kong	Henry Dahlgren; Norway
Singles 3	Fritz Krimmel; West Germany	Heinz Simon; West Germany	Andre Hennaert; France
Singles 3	Fritz Krimmel; West Germany	Heinz Simon; West Germany	G. Monoghan; Great Britain
Singles 4	Baruch Hagai; Israel	Michael Dempsey; United States	Triche; France
Singles 4	Baruch Hagai; Israel	Michael Dempsey; United States	P. Lyall; Great Britain
Doubles 1A	Switzerland (SUI); Rainer Küschall; Hans Rosenast	West Germany (FRG); Konkel; Sackerer	West Germany (FRG); Hans Lubbering; Edund Weber
Doubles 1A	Switzerland (SUI); Rainer Küschall; Hans Rosenast	West Germany (FRG); Konkel; Sackerer	United States (USA); Nichol; Rod Vleiger
Doubles 1B	West Germany (FRG); B. Boerstler; G. Laner	West Germany (FRG); Wolfgang Koch; Steiner	Great Britain (GBR); Stephen Bradshaw; T. Taylor
Doubles 1B	West Germany (FRG); B. Boerstler; G. Laner	West Germany (FRG); Wolfgang Koch; Steiner	Netherlands (NED); Hans Pimmelar; Paul Suijkerbuijk
Teams 2	West Germany (FRG)	Great Britain (GBR)	Sweden (SWE)
Teams 2	West Germany (FRG)	Great Britain (GBR)	Hong Kong (HKG)
Teams 3	West Germany (FRG)	Italy (ITA); Giovanni Ferraris; Oliver Venturi	Sweden (SWE)
Teams 3	West Germany (FRG)	Italy (ITA); Giovanni Ferraris; Oliver Venturi	Austria (AUT)
Teams 4	South Korea (KOR)	Sweden (SWE)	United States (USA)
Teams 4	South Korea (KOR)	Sweden (SWE)	Great Britain (GBR)

=== Women's events ===
Event	Gold	Silver	Bronze
Singles 1A	Aria de Vries-Noordam; Netherlands	Ursula Schatz; Switzerland	Demerakas; Canada
Singles 1A	Aria de Vries-Noordam; Netherlands	Ursula Schatz; Switzerland	Mati Angel; Israel
Singles 1B	Rosa Sicari; Italy	Jane Blackburn; Great Britain	Tora Lysoe; Norway
Singles 1B	Rosa Sicari; Italy	Jane Blackburn; Great Britain	Tournier; France
Singles 2	Rosa Schweizer; Austria	Ilse Scharf; Austria	Maguy Ramousse; France
Singles 2	Rosa Schweizer; Austria	Ilse Scharf; Austria	G. Matthews; Great Britain
Singles 3	Ingrid Voboril; Austria	J. Swann; Great Britain	Michal Escapa; Israel
Singles 3	Ingrid Voboril; Austria	J. Swann; Great Britain	Gwen Buck; Great Britain
Singles 4	Carol Bryant; Great Britain	L. Verbrauwe; Belgium	Irene Schmidt; Netherlands
Singles 4	Carol Bryant; Great Britain	L. Verbrauwe; Belgium	O'Brien; Great Britain
Doubles 1A-1B	Great Britain (GBR); Barbara Anderson; Jane Blackburn	Norway (NOR); A. Klausen; Tora Lysoe	Switzerland (SUI); Gilberte Brasey; Ursula Schatz
Doubles 1A-1B	Great Britain (GBR); Barbara Anderson; Jane Blackburn	Norway (NOR); A. Klausen; Tora Lysoe	Canada (CAN); Demerakas; S. Long
Teams 2	Austria (AUT)	Ireland (IRL)	United States (USA)
Teams 2	Austria (AUT)	Ireland (IRL)	Great Britain (GBR)
Teams 3	Austria (AUT)	Great Britain (GBR)	Canada (CAN)
Teams 3	Austria (AUT)	Great Britain (GBR)	United States (USA)
Teams 4	Netherlands (NED); Loes Lekx; Irene Schmidt	Sweden (SWE)	Austria (AUT)
