= Athletics at the 1972 Summer Paralympics – Women's 60 metres wheelchair 1A =

Women's 60 m wheelchair 1A at the IV Paralympic Games
- Paralympic Athletics
- Competitors: 5 from 4 nations

Medalists
1st place, gold medalist(s)		Mayer	West Germany
2nd place, silver medalist(s)		Aria de Vries-Noordam	Netherlands
3rd place, bronze medalist(s)		Karen Donaldson	United States

The Women's 60 m wheelchair 1A was one of the events held in Athletics at the 1972 Summer Paralympics in Heidelberg.

5 competitors competed in a single race.

Mayer of West Germany won the gold medal.

== Results ==
=== Final ===
Rank	Athlete	Time
1st place, gold medalist(s)	Mayer (FRG)	22.0
2nd place, silver medalist(s)	Aria de Vries-Noordam (NED)	30.9
3rd place, bronze medalist(s)	Karen Donaldson (USA)	33.0
4	Joyce Murland (CAN)	1:03.1
5	Demerakas (CAN)	1:47.8
