= Athletics at the 1972 Summer Paralympics – Men's 100 metres wheelchair 2 =

Men's 100 m wheelchair 2 at the IV Paralympic Games
- Paralympic Athletics
- Competitors: 22 from 12 nations

Medalists
1st place, gold medalist(s)		Gary Kerr	United States
2nd place, silver medalist(s)		Goldmann	United States
3rd place, bronze medalist(s)		Ray Barrett	Australia

The Men's 100 m wheelchair 2 was one of the events held in Athletics at the 1972 Summer Paralympics in Heidelberg.

There were 22 competitors in the heat; 5 made it into the final.

U.S. wheelchair athlete Gary Kerr won the gold medal.

== Results ==
=== Heats ===
Rank	Athlete	Time
1	Gary Kerr (USA)	25.9
2	Goldmann (USA)	26.1
3	Joze Okoren (YUG)	27.5
4	Ray Barrett (AUS)	27.9
5	Giuseppe Trieste (ITA)	29.6
6	Frank Ponta (AUS)	29.7
7	Wasnock (CAN)	30.1
8	Javurek (AUT)	30.4
9	Weijers (NED)	30.6
10	Bruno Hahn (AUT)	31.5
11	Hans Muff (SUI)	31.5
12	D. Miller (NZL)	32.3
13	Ignaz Casutt (SUI)	32.7
14	Koon Hung Lee (HKG)	33.6
15	Rupnik (YUG)	34.3
16	Misik (TCH)	37.4
17	Leopold Seybert (AUT)	38.0
18	Cresnik (YUG)	38.5
19	Peter Cossalter (SUI)	38.6
20	John Leung (HKG)	38.7
21	Yuk Loong Lam (HKG)	41.4
22	Chandrashekhar (IND)	1:28.4

=== Final ===
Rank	Athlete	Time
1st place, gold medalist(s)	Gary Kerr (USA)	23.2
2nd place, silver medalist(s)	Goldmann (USA)	23.4
3rd place, bronze medalist(s)	Ray Barrett (AUS)	24.4
4	Giuseppe Trieste (ITA)	25.0
5	Joze Okoren (YUG)	25.6
