= Athletics at the 1972 Summer Paralympics – Women's 60 metres wheelchair 1B =

Women's 60 m wheelchair 1B at the IV Paralympic Games
- Paralympic Athletics
- Competitors: 9 from 9 nations

Medalists
1st place, gold medalist(s)		Rosaleen Gallagher	Ireland
2nd place, silver medalist(s)		Tracey Freeman	Australia
3rd place, bronze medalist(s)		Andres	West Germany

The Women's 60 m wheelchair 1B was one of the events held in Athletics at the 1972 Summer Paralympics in Heidelberg.

There were 9 competitors in the heats; 5 made it into the final.

Rosaleen Gallagher of Ireland won the gold medal.

== Results ==
=== Heats ===
Rank	Athlete	Time
1	Rosaleen Gallagher (IRL)	24.6
2	Tracey Freeman (AUS)	25.8
3	Andres (FRG)	26.4
4	Broemmer (USA)	26.7
5	Tatyana Susteric (YUG)	26.9
6	Cunelova (TCH)	29.1
7	Rosa Sicari (ITA)	37.7
8	S. Long (CAN)	39.9
9	Ursula Schatz (SUI)	50.1

=== Final ===
Rank	Athlete	Time
1st place, gold medalist(s)	Rosaleen Gallagher (IRL)	22.7
2nd place, silver medalist(s)	Tracey Freeman (AUS)	22.8
3rd place, bronze medalist(s)	Andres (FRG)	24.7
4	Broemmer (USA)	25.6
5	Tatyana Susteric (YUG)	26.1
