= Athletics at the 1972 Summer Paralympics – Women's pentathlon 4 =

Women's pentathlon 4 at the IV Paralympic Games
- Paralympic Athletics
- Competitors: 5 from 4 nations

Medalists
1st place, gold medalist(s)		Marga Floer	West Germany
2nd place, silver medalist(s)		Ora Goldstein	Israel
3rd place, bronze medalist(s)		Carol Bryant	Great Britain

The Women's pentathlon 4 was a pentathlon event held in athletics at the 1972 Summer Paralympics in Heidelberg.

Five athletes competed, representing four nations. As the only athlete to score more than 4000 points, Germany's Marga Floer took the gold medal.

Rank	Athlete	Points
1st place, gold medalist(s)	Marga Floer (GER)	4275
2nd place, silver medalist(s)	Ora Goldstein (ISR)	3906
3rd place, bronze medalist(s)	Carol Bryant (GBR)	3802
4	Le Roux (RSA)	3531
5	J. Orpwood (GBR)	3458
