= Athletics at the 1972 Summer Paralympics – Men's pentathlon 1B =

Men's pentathlon 1B at the IV Paralympic Games
- Paralympic Athletics
- Competitors: 7 from 5 nations

Medalists
1st place, gold medalist(s)		Patrick Reid	Jamaica
2nd place, silver medalist(s)		Julius Duval	United States
3rd place, bronze medalist(s)		R. Zeyher	West Germany

The Men's pentathlon 1B was one of the events held in Athletics at the 1972 Summer Paralympics in Heidelberg.

There were 7 competitors in the event.

Patrick Reid of Jamaica won the gold medal.

== Results ==
=== Final ===
Rank	Athlete	Points
1st place, gold medalist(s)	Patrick Reid (JAM)	8449
2nd place, silver medalist(s)	Julius Duval (USA)	6893
3rd place, bronze medalist(s)	R. Zeyher (FRG)	6665
4	Tullius (FRG)	5838
5	Tom Parker (CAN)	5829
6	Robert Ocvirk (USA)	5481
7	S. Bradshaw (GBR)	3996
