= Athletics at the 1972 Summer Paralympics – Men's pentathlon 3 =

Men's pentathlon 3 at the IV Paralympic Games
- Paralympic Athletics
- Competitors: 10 from 6 nations

Medalists
1st place, gold medalist(s)		David Williamson	United States
2nd place, silver medalist(s)		Heinz Simon	West Germany
3rd place, bronze medalist(s)		Terry Mason	Australia

The Men's pentathlon 3 was one of the events held in Athletics at the 1972 Summer Paralympics in Heidelberg.

There were 10 competitors in the event.

David Williamson of the United States won the gold medal.

== Results ==
=== Final ===
Rank	Athlete	Points
1st place, gold medalist(s)	David Williamson (USA)	5351
2nd place, silver medalist(s)	Heinz Simon (FRG)	5152
3rd place, bronze medalist(s)	Terry Mason (AUS)	4900
4	Walter Hertle (FRG)	4635
5	Chris Nicholls (NZL)	4349
6	Josef Greil (AUT)	4187
7	Jim Savage (NZL)	4158
8	Walther (FRG)	4154
9	Myers (USA)	4349
10	Clarence Bastarache (CAN)	2378
