= Swimming at the 1972 Summer Paralympics – Men's 25 metre freestyle 1A =

Men's 25 m freestyle 1A at the IV Paralympic Games
- Paralympic Athletics
- Competitors: 2 from 2 nations

Medalists
1st place, gold medalist(s)		Raffin	France
2nd place, silver medalist(s)		A. West	Great Britain

The men's 25 metres freestyle 1A was one of the events held in Swimming at the 1972 Summer Paralympics in Heidelberg.

There were 2 competitors in the event.

Raffin of France won the gold medal.

== Results ==
=== Final ===
Rank	Athlete	Points
1st place, gold medalist(s)	Raffin (FRA)	5351
2nd place, silver medalist(s)	A. West (GBR)	5152
