= Philip Craven =

English sports administrator

Sir Philip Craven MBE
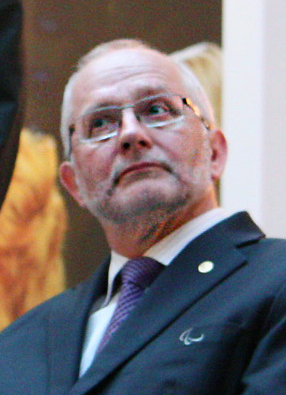
- Craven in 2012

2nd President of the International Paralympic Committee
- In office 8 December 2001 – 8 September 2017
- Preceded by: Robert Steadward
- Succeeded by: Andrew Parsons

Personal details
- Born: 4 July 1950 (age 76) Bolton, England, United Kingdom
- Spouse: Jocelyne
- Children: 2, Gaëlle, Yann
- Education: Bolton School
- Alma mater: University of Manchester
- Occupation: Sports administrator

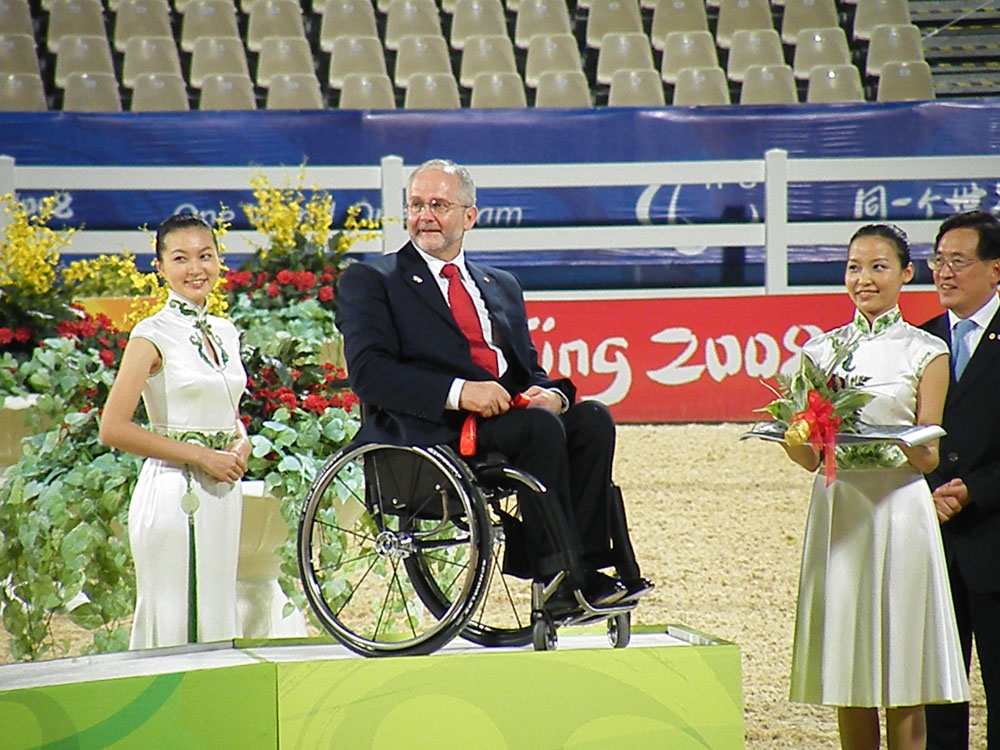
Sir Philip participating in the medal presentation ceremony for the equestrian events at the 2008 Beijing Paralympics

Sir Philip Lee Craven MBE (born 4 July 1950) is an English sports administrator, former Paralympic wheelchair basketball player, swimmer and track and field athlete. Between 2001 and 2017 he was the second president of the International Paralympic Committee (IPC).

== Early life and education ==
Craven was born on 4 July 1951 in Bolton, England. He was educated at Bolton School Boys' Division, where he was a keen swimmer, cricketer and tennis player. In 1966, at the age of 16, he fell during a rock-climbing expedition at Wilton Quarries, Bolton. The accident left him without the use of his legs. He studied geography at the University of Manchester, and graduated with a Bachelor of Arts (BA) degree in 1972.

== Athlete ==
Craven represented Great Britain in wheelchair basketball at five editions of the Paralympic Games, from 1972 to 1988. He also competed in track and field athletics and swimming at the 1972 Games.

He won gold at the Wheelchair Basketball World Championships in 1973, bronze in 1975, and two gold medals (1971, 1974) and a silver (1993) at the European Championships. He also won gold at the European Champions Cup in 1994, and gold at the 1970 Commonwealth Paraplegic Games.

=== Results at the Paralympic Games ===
Games	Events	Result	Rank
1972	Athletics: Men's 100m (wheelchair, category 3)	29.1 s.	24 (of 41)
1972	Athletics: Men's slalom (category 3)	75.4 s.	24 (of 28)
1972	Swimming: Men's 50m breaststroke (category 3)	59.45 s.	6 (of 13, in the heats) did not advance
1972	Men's wheelchair basketball	Group A: lost to Argentina 48:56, won vs Sweden 44:38, won vs Netherlands 39:31, won vs Italy 40:17; Semi-final: lost to USA 36:52; Bronze medal match: lost to Argentina 39:54	4 (of 19)
1976	Men's wheelchair basketball	Group C: lost to Argentina 48:52, won vs West Germany 33:28, tied vs Spain 38:38, won vs Denmark 74:22; Quarter-final: lost to Israel 26:60	no rank
1980	Men's wheelchair basketball	Group D: lost to France 36:63, lost to Sweden 43:71, won vs Egypt 122:24; Second round: lost to W. Germany 44:56, won vs Australia 62:33, won vs Denmark 66:44; Semi-final for 9th place: lost to Belgium 23:63; Final for 11th place: lost to Spain 54:66	12 (of 17)
1984	Men's wheelchair basketball	Group C: won vs France 48:47, won vs Australia 62:42, lost to Japan 52:62, won vs Egypt 108:13; Quarter-final: lost to USA 40:78	no rank
1988	Men's wheelchair basketball	Group A: lost to USA 38:52, lost to Sweden 39:42, won vs Brazil 61:21; Quarter-final for 9th place: won vs S. Korea 60:30; Semi-final for 9th place: lost to Australia 29:40; Final for 11th place: won vs Spain 40:34	11 (of 17)

== Sports administrator ==
In 1980, alongside Horst Strohkendl and Stan Labanowich, Craven played a vital role in the development of a new classification system for wheelchair basketball athletes. Wheelchair basketball rejected its medically based classification system consisting of 3 classes, a system that was founded upon principles that forced athletes to depend on medical examinations. This progress led to a new 4-class functional system, which was democratically voted in 1982. Due to this, wheelchair basketball was increasingly associated with sport as opposed to medicine and rehabilitation, although both still play an important secondary role.

In 1988, Craven was elected Chairman of the Wheelchair Basketball Section of the International Stoke Mandeville Games Federation (ISMGF), the first athlete to lead the sport worldwide. Craven's striving for self-determination and self-government pave the way for the establishment of wheelchair basketball as an independent federation, when it gave up its previous identification as a basketball section of the ISMGF to become the independent, self-governing International Wheelchair Basketball Federation (IWBF) in 1993. At the First IWBF Official World Congress 1994 in Edmonton, Alberta, Philip Craven was elected the first President of IWBF, holding the office until 1998. A productive and more formalised working relationship with FIBA, the worldwide governing body for the sport of basketball, was arranged under Craven's administration, to further legitimise wheelchair basketball itself.

=== Notable achievements as sports administrator ===
- Chairman, Great Britain Wheelchair Basketball Association (GBWBA) (1977–1980, 1984–1987, 1989–1994)
- Chairman, Classification Committee, ISMWSF Basketball Section (1984–1988)
- Chief Executive Officer, International Wheelchair Basketball Federation (IWBF) (1994–1998)
- Performance Director, GBWBA Men's Wheelchair Basketball Team (1998–2002)
- President, International Wheelchair Basketball Federation (IWBF) (1998–2002)
- President, International Paralympic Committee (IPC) (2001-2017)
- Foundation board member, World Anti-Doping Agency (WADA) (since 2002)
- Board member, Olympic Truce Foundation (since 2002)
- Member, IOC Commission for Culture and Olympic Education (since 2005)
- Member, IOC 2008 Beijing Co-ordination Commission (2002-2008)
- Member, IOC Sport & Environment Commission (2002–2005)
- Member, International Olympic Committee (IOC) (since 2003)
- Member, Executive Board, British Olympic Association (since 2003)
- Administration Council Member, International Committee for Fair Play (since 2003)
- Board member, London 2012 Organizing Committee for the Olympic and Paralympic Games (2005–12)
- Member, IOC Congress 2009 Commission (2006–09)

== President of the International Paralympic Committee ==
Craven was elected as the second President of the International Paralympic Committee in 2001. He oversaw 8 Paralympic games with his first being Salt Lake City in 2002 and his last being in Rio de Janeiro in 2016. Sir Philip became the first President to have the Paralympics games hosted in his home country, with the UK in 2012.

On 7 August 2016, Sir Philip announced that the International Paralympic Committee would ban Russia from participating in the 2016 Paralympic Games for allegedly violating international doping rules. This followed WADA's June 2016 report with accusations of state-sponsored doping in Russia.

Sir Philip put the blame for the ban on Russia's government, stating that Russia has "catastrophically failed its para athletes," adding, "their medals-over-morals mentality disgusts me." Russia's appeal to the CAS against the ban was rejected, a decision that prompted President Vladimir Putin's public accusations against the international bodies responsible for imposing the ban.

== Other activities ==
Craven served as Company Secretary at the British Coal Corporation from 1986 up to 1991.

He is an Ambassador for Peace and Sport, a Monaco-based international organisation, committed to serving peace in the world through sport.

In the 1991 New Years Honours List he was appointed a Member of the Order of the British Empire (MBE) by Queen Elizabeth II "for services to sport for the disabled." In the 2005 Birthday Honours, Craven was Knighted by the Queen for services to Paralympic Sport.

In 2017, Sir Philip was awarded the Paralympic Order.

In June 2018, Sir Philip was appointed to the board of directors of the Toyota Motor Corporation.

== See also ==
- Thomas Bach, president of the International Olympic Committee (IOC)
