= Ryszard Machowczyk =

Personal information
- Born: 9 October 1951 Kalisz, Poland
- Died: 16 April 2011 (aged 59) Kalisz, Poland

Sport
- Sport: Paralympic swimming
Medal record
Representing Poland
Paralympic Games
Gold medal – first place	1972 Heidelberg	100m backstroke 5
Gold medal – first place	1972 Heidelberg	150m individual medley 5
Gold medal – first place	1972 Heidelberg	3x100m medley relay
Gold medal – first place	1976 Toronto	150m individual medley 5
Gold medal – first place	1976 Toronto	3x100m medley relay
Gold medal – first place	1980 Arnhem	100m backstroke 5
Gold medal – first place	1980 Arnhem	200m freestyle 5
Silver medal – second place	1972 Heidelberg	100m breaststroke 5
Silver medal – second place	1980 Arnhem	50m butterfly 5
Silver medal – second place	1980 Arnhem	100m breaststroke 5
Bronze medal – third place	1976 Toronto	100m breaststroke 5

Ryszard Machowczyk (9 October 1951 – 16 April 2011) was a Polish Paralympic swimmer who competed in international swimming competitions. He was a six-time Paralympic champion and competed at the 1972, 1976 and 1980 Summer Paralympics.
