= 1972 Summer Paralympics medal table =

1972 Summer Paralympics medals
- Location: Heidelberg, West Germany

Highlights
- Most gold medals: West Germany (28)
- Most total medals: West Germany (67)
- Medalling NPCs: 31

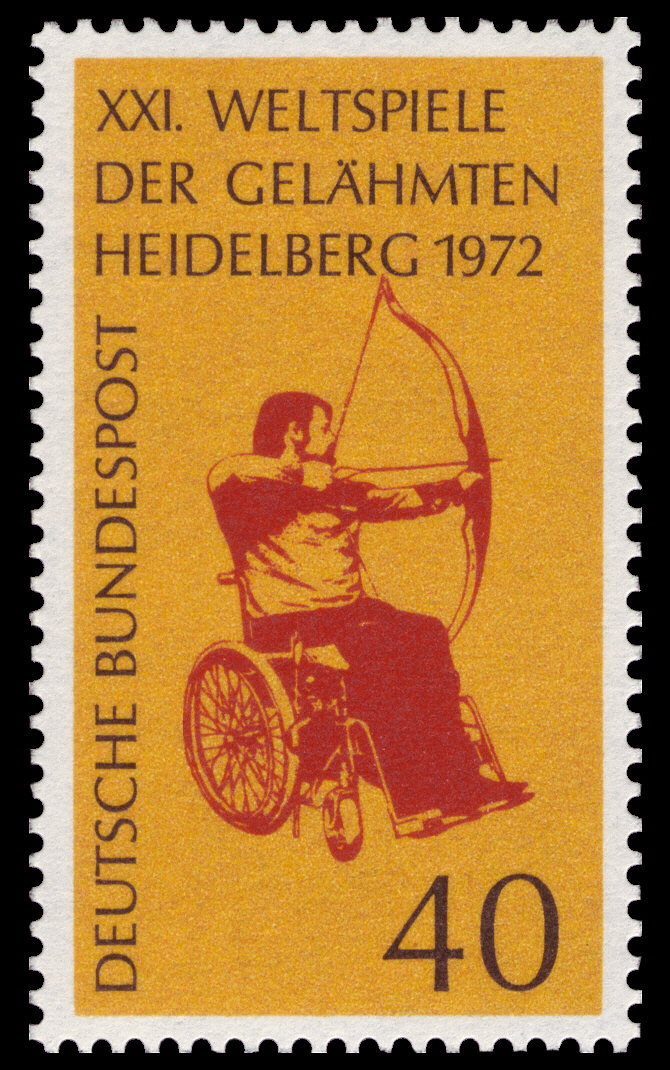
A German postage stamp released at the time of the Games

The 21st International Stoke Mandeville Games, later known as the 1972 Summer Paralympics (also known as the XXI World Games for the Paralysed) was an international multi-sport event held in Heidelberg, West Germany, from August 2 to 11, 1972, in which athletes with physical disabilities competed against one another. The German Disabled Sports Association planned to stage the Games in Munich following the 1972 Olympic Games, however the Olympic village in Munich was designated to be closed and converted into private apartments. The organisers tried to arrange for alternative accommodation for the athletes, but when this was not possible the city of Heidelberg stepped in with an invitation to stage the Games at the University of Heidelberg's Institute for Physical Training.

In total 575 medals were awarded in 187 events in 10 different sports. Of the 42 competing National Paralympic Committees (NPCs) 31 won at least one medal. The host nation won the most gold medals, with 28, and the United States won the most total medals with 74. Rhodesia competed at these Games, winning 12 medals, but did not take part at the 1972 Summer Olympics after their invitation was withdrawn by the International Olympic Committee, four days before the opening ceremony, in response to African countries' protests against the Rhodesian regime. This medal table ranks the competing NPCs by the number of gold medals won by their athletes.

Notable gold medallists included Canadian Eugene Reimer, who set a world record in discus with a throw of 29.91 metres and also won a gold medal in the pentathlon and silver in the 4×60 metres wheelchair relay. A crowd of 4,000 watched the United States defeat defending champions Israel 59–58 to take the gold medal in men's wheelchair basketball. Zipora Rubin-Rosenbaum of Israel won a gold medal in the women's javelin throw 5 events, with a new world record of 18.50 metres, and also won a silver medal in the shot put.

== Medal table ==
The ranking in this table is based on information provided by the International Paralympic Committee (IPC) and is consistent with IPC convention in its published medal tables. By default, the table is ordered by the number of gold medals the athletes from a nation have won (in this context, a "nation" is an entity represented by a NPC). The number of silver medals is taken into consideration next, and then the number of bronze medals. If nations are still tied, equal ranking is given, and they are listed alphabetically by IPC country code.

Two bronze medals were awarded in each table tennis and lawn bowls event. Some athletics and swimming events did not award silver or bronze medals.

* Host nation (West Germany)

Rank	Nation	Gold	Silver	Bronze	Total
1	West Germany*	28	17	22	67
2	United States	17	27	31	75
3	Great Britain	16	15	21	52
4	South Africa	16	12	13	41
5	Netherlands	14	13	11	38
6	Poland	14	12	7	33
7	France	10	8	15	33
8	Israel	9	10	9	28
9	Italy	8	4	5	17
10	Jamaica	8	3	4	15
11	Australia	6	9	10	25
12	Austria	6	6	6	18
13	Canada	5	6	8	19
14	Sweden	5	6	6	17
15	Japan	4	5	3	12
16	South Korea	4	2	1	7
17	Rhodesia	3	5	4	12
18	New Zealand	3	3	3	9
19	Switzerland	3	2	4	9
20	Argentina	2	4	3	9
21	Ireland	2	4	2	8
22	Norway	1	5	4	10
23	Belgium	1	1	2	4
23	Yugoslavia	1	1	2	4
25	India	1	0	0	1
25	Kenya	1	0	0	1
27	Spain	0	4	0	4
28	Finland	0	2	1	3
29	Hong Kong	0	1	1	2
30	Czechoslovakia	0	0	1	1
30	Hungary	0	0	1	1
Totals (31 entries)		188	187	200	575

== See also ==
- 1972 Summer Olympics medal table
