= Athletics at the 1972 Summer Paralympics – Women's pentathlon 5 =

Women's pentathlon 5 at the IV Paralympic Games
- Paralympic Athletics
- Competitors: 1 from 1 nation

Medalists
1st place, gold medalist(s)		O'Brien	Great Britain

The Women's pentathlon 5 was a pentathlon event held in athletics at the 1972 Summer Paralympics in Heidelberg.

O'Brien (full name not recorded) of Great Britain was the only competitor, despite the other pentathlon events having several competitors. She completed the event, alone, scoring 1499 points, to take the gold medal.

Rank	Athlete	Points
1st place, gold medalist(s)	O'Brien (GBR)	1499
