= Dartchery at the 1972 Summer Paralympics =

Dartchery at the IV Paralympic Games

Dartchery at the 1972 Summer Paralympics consisted of three events.

== Medal summary ==
Event	Gold	Silver	Bronze
Men's pairs open	West Germany (FRG); Elbracht; E. Hammel	Netherlands (NED); Pieter Blanker; Popke Popkema	Belgium (BEL); Seilleur van Braet
Women's pairs open	Great Britain (GBR); M. Cooper; Margaret Maughan	France (FRA); Girard; Mireille Marraschin	Norway (NOR); Marit Berg-Holmen; Herdis Warberg
Mixed pairs open	West Germany (FRG); Becker; Schaede	South Korea (KOR); Keum Im Cho; Keun Soo Kim	United States (USA); Collins; Dropko
