= Chaim Fliter =

Israeli Paralympic athlete

Personal information
- Native name: חיים פליטר
Medal record
Event / 1st / 2nd / 3rd; Paralympic Games / 2 / 2 / 4
Representing Israel
Paralympic Games
Men's para athletics
Gold medal – first place	1976 New York	Javelin 5
Gold medal – first place	1976 New York	Discus throw 5
Silver medal – second place	1972 Heidelberg	Javelin 5
Silver medal – second place	1984 Stoke Mandville	Discus throw 6
Bronze medal – third place	1972 Heidelberg	Discus throw 5
Bronze medal – third place	1976 New York	Shot put 5
Bronze medal – third place	1984 Stoke Mandville	Javelin 6
Bronze medal – third place	1984 Stoke Mandville	Shot put 6

Chaim Fliter (Hebrew: חיים פליטר) was a former Paralympic athlete representing Israel.

He competed in men's para athletics events and gained eight Paralympic medals for discus throw (gold medal in 1976, silver in 1984 and bronze in 1972), javelin throw (gold in 1976, silver in 1972 and bronze in 1984) and shot put (bronze medals in 1976 and 1984).

Fliter was married to Cochava Fliter who was a member of the women's wheelchair basketball team in the 1972 and 1976 Paralympics.

== See also ==
- Israel at the 1972 Summer Paralympics
- Israel at the 1976 Summer Paralympics
- Israel at the 1984 Summer Paralympics
