= Francisco Benítez =

Francisco Benítez may refer to:

- Francisco Benítez Ynga (fl. 17th century), indigenous nobleman and politician of the Spanish Empire
- Francisco Benítez (swimmer) (born 1962), Spanish swimmer
- Francisco Benítez (1963–2013), Spanish member of the French Foreign Legion, involved in the disappearance of Allison and Marie-José Benitez
- Francisco Benítez (cyclist) (born 1970), Spanish road cyclist
