= Shlomo Finkelstein =

Israeli Paralympic swimmer

Personal information
- Native name: שלמה פינקלשטיין
- Nationality: Israel

Sport
- Sport: Swimming
Medal record
Event / 1st / 2nd / 3rd; Paralympic Games / 2 / 0 / 0
Men's para swimming
Representing Israel
Paralympic Games
Gold medal – first place	1972 Heidelberg	50m backstroke 3
Gold medal – first place	1972 Heidelberg	3x25 m Medley 3
National Championship (Israel)
Gold medal – first place	1975	25m butterfly
Gold medal – first place	1975	3X25m individual medley

Shlomo Finkelstein (Hebrew: שלמה פינקלשטיין) is an Israeli former Paralympic swimmer.

== Career ==
Representing Israel at the 1972 Summer Paralympics, Finkelstein won a gold medal in swimming at the 50m backstroke class 3 event and a secondgold medal at the 3X25m individual medly class 3 event. He also reached sixth place in the Men's 50m freestyle class 3 event and took part in the athletics competitions in the 100m race.

In 1975, Finkelstein won two gold medals at the National championship of Israel, setting two new national records: 27.8 second in the 25m butterfly event and 1:21.1 minutes in the 3X25 individual medley event.
