= Lawn bowls at the 1972 Summer Paralympics =

Lawn bowls at the IV Paralympic Games
- Paralympic Lawn bowls

Lawn bowls at the 1972 Summer Paralympics consisted of four events.

== Medal summary ==
Event	Gold	Silver	Bronze
Men's singles	Eric Magennis; Australia	John Ure; Great Britain	Giuliano Koten; Italy
Men's pairs	Ireland (IRL); Jimmy Gibson; Eddie Lucas	Great Britain (GBR); Tom Guthrie; John Ure	United States (USA); Patton; Swing
Men's pairs	Ireland (IRL); Jimmy Gibson; Eddie Lucas	Great Britain (GBR); Tom Guthrie; John Ure	France (FRA); Michel Allorge; Roger Schuh
Women's singles	Margaret Harriman; South Africa	F. Nowak; Great Britain	Pamela Barnard; Great Britain
Women's singles	Margaret Harriman; South Africa	F. Nowak; Great Britain	Heller; France
Women's pairs	Great Britain (GBR); Gwen Buck; Irene Nowak	South Africa (RSA); Margaret Harriman; Hattingh	France (FRA); Belasset; Belaubre
Women's pairs	Great Britain (GBR); Gwen Buck; Irene Nowak	South Africa (RSA); Margaret Harriman; Hattingh	United States (USA); Anderson; Keyser
