= Aria de Vries-Noordam =

Dutch Paralympic athlete

Sport
- Country: Netherlands
- Sport: Para-athletics; Table tennis
Medal record
Representing the Netherlands
Paralympic Games
Athletics
Gold medal – first place	1972 Heidelberg	Shot put 1A
Silver medal – second place	1972 Heidelberg	60 m wheelchair 1A
Table tennis
Gold medal – first place	1972 Heidelberg	Singles 1A

Aria de Vries-Noordam is a Dutch Paralympic athlete. She represented the Netherlands at the 1972 Summer Paralympics held in Heidelberg, West Germany and she competed both in athletics and table tennis.

She won two medals in athletics: the gold medal in the women's shot put 1A event and the silver medal in the women's 60 metres wheelchair 1A event. She also won the gold medal in the women's singles 1A event in table tennis.
