= Jim Savage (shot putter) =

New Zealand athlete (1936–2023)

Jim Savage MBE
Personal information
- Full name: James Leslie Herbert Savage
- Born: 1 July 1936
- Died: 20 February 2023 (aged 86)

Sport
- Country: New Zealand
- Sport: Athletics; archery; table tennis
Medal record
Men's para athletics
Representing New Zealand
Paralympic Games
Bronze medal – third place	1972 Heidelberg	Shot put 3
Bronze medal – third place	1976 Toronto	Shot put 3

James Leslie Herbert Savage MBE (1 July 1936 – 20 February 2023) was a New Zealand Paralympic athletics competitor. He won bronze medals at the 1972 and 1976 Summer Paralympics in the shot put 3 event.

In the 1977 New Year Honours, Savage was appointed a Member of the Order of the British Empire, for services to paraplegics and sport.

Savage died on 20 February 2023, at the age of 86.
