= Bertrand de Five Pranger =

Spanish swimmer (born 1950)

Bertrand de Five
Personal information
- Full name: Bertrand de Five Pranger
- Nationality: Spain
- Born: 28 May 1950 (age 76) Barcelona, Spain

Sport
- Sport: Swimming
Medal record
Men's swimming
Representing Spain
Paralympic Games
Gold medal – first place	1976 Toronto	50 m freestyle 3
Silver medal – second place	1976 Toronto	3x25 m medley 3
Silver medal – second place	1972 Heidelberg	50 m freestyle 4
Silver medal – second place	1972 Heidelberg	3x25 m medley 4

Bertrand de Five Pranger (born 28 May 1950 in Barcelona), also known as Beltrand de Five Pranger, is a swimmer from Spain. He competed at the 1972 Summer Paralympics, winning a silver in two different swimming races. He competed at the 1976 Summer Paralympics, winning a gold in one swimming race and silver in a different swimming race.
