= Edward Coyle =

American paralympic weightlifter

Personal information
- Born: Lansdowne, Pennsylvania, U.S.

Sport
- Country: United States
- Sport: Weightlifting
- Disability: Polio
Medal record
Representing United States
Paralympic Games
Weightlifting
Gold medal – first place	Heidelberg 1972	Men's middleweight
Gold medal – first place	Toronto 1976	Men's lightweight
Silver medal – second place	Arnhem 1980	Men's middleweight - 75kg paraplegic

Edward J. Coyle is an American paralympic weightlifter. He competed at the 1972, 1976 and 1980 Summer Paralympics.

== Biography ==
Coyle was born in Lansdowne, Pennsylvania. He contracted polio at the age of two. He attended Monsignor Bonner High School, where he was on the football and rowing teams before taking up weightlifting. He attended West Chester University, earning a PhD in 1977.

Coyle competed at the 1972 Summer Paralympics, winning the gold medal in the men's middleweight weightlifting. At the 1976 Summer Paralympics Coyle won the gold medal in the men's lightweight event. He scored 177.5 pounds. At the 1980 Summer Paralympics he won the silver medal in the men's middleweight - 75kg paraplegic event.
