= Moshe Mousai =

Israeli Paralympic swimmer

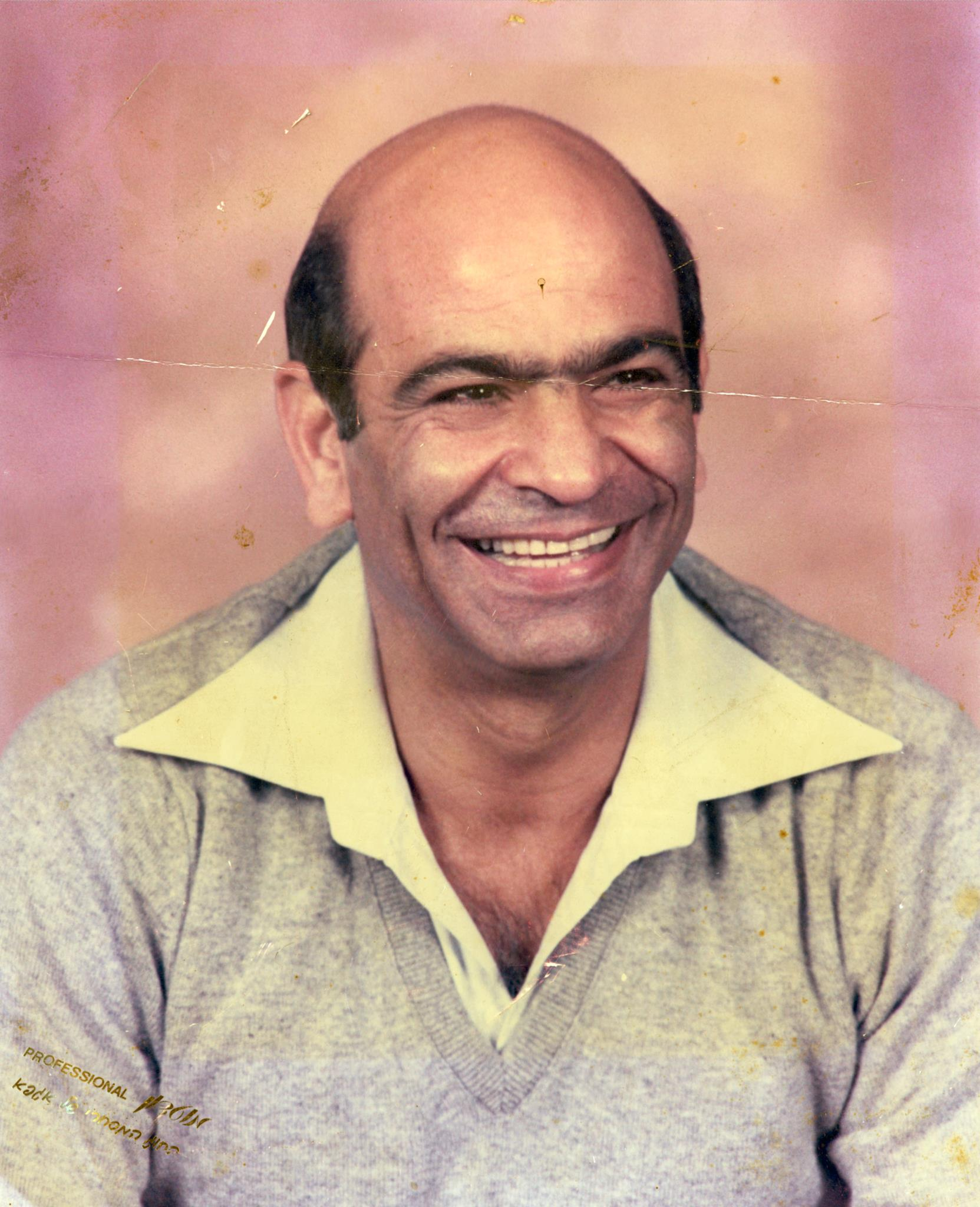

Personal information
- Native name: משה מוסאי
- Born: 1942 (age 83–84) Iran

Sport
- Country: Israel
- Sport: Para swimming
Medal record
Event / 1st / 2nd / 3rd; Paralympic Games / 1 / 0 / 0
Representing Israel
Paralympic Games
Para swimming
Gold medal – first place	1972 Heidelberg	25m backstroke 2

Moshe Mousai (Hebrew: משה מוסאי; born 1942) is a former Israeli Paralympic swimmer and wheelchair basketball player.

== Career ==
Mousai was born in Iran and emigrated with his family to Israel in 1950. From 1958 to 1961 he completed his military service in the Nahal Brigade and in 1967 he was enlisted to the Six Day War under the Paratroopers Brigade. He was injured in Jerusalem and paralyzed in both legs.

He competed in the 1972 Summer Paralympics and 1976 Summer Paralympics, taking part in five events as an individual competitor and reaching the final in two events: ranking sixth in the Men's 50 m Freestyle 4 tournament (1972) and eighth in the Men's 25 m Butterfly 4 tournament (1976). At the 1972 Games, he won a gold medal in the 3×50 m medley relay 2-4 tournament, alongside Moshe Levy and Joseph Wengier.

Mousai was active with the Israel Sports Center for the Disabled and a member of the wheelchair basketball team for Beit Halochem. He was a member of Israel men's national wheelchair basketball team for fifteen years.
