= Athletics at the 1972 Summer Paralympics =

Athletics at the IV Paralympic Games
- Competitors: 549 from 39 nations

Athletics at the 1972 Summer Paralympics consisted of 73 events, 37 for men and 36 for women.

== Participating nations ==
- Argentina (19)
- Australia (21)
- Austria (27)
- Bahamas (1)
- Belgium (10)
- Brazil (7)
- Canada (35)
- Czechoslovakia (19)
- Denmark (1)
- Egypt (1)
- Finland (15)
- France (11)
- Great Britain (33)
- Hong Kong (9)
- Hungary (4)
- India (9)
- Ireland (11)
- Israel (19)
- Italy (13)
- Jamaica (17)
- Japan (24)
- Kenya (3)
- Malaysia (3)
- Malta (8)
- Mexico (5)
- Netherlands (13)
- New Zealand (10)
- Norway (5)
- Poland (9)
- Rhodesia (4)
- South Africa (19)
- South Korea (2)
- Spain (6)
- Sweden (14)
- Switzerland (28)
- Uganda (2)
- United States (43)
- West Germany (49)
- Yugoslavia (20)

== Medal table ==
Rank	Nation	Gold	Silver	Bronze	Total
1	United States (USA)	14	18	17	49
2	West Germany (FRG)	13	8	11	32
3	South Africa (RSA)	5	6	6	17
4	Great Britain (GBR)	5	1	1	7
5	Canada (CAN)	4	6	4	14
6	Japan (JPN)	4	4	1	9
7	Jamaica (JAM)	4	0	1	5
8	Israel (ISR)	3	5	2	10
9	Australia (AUS)	3	4	4	11
10	New Zealand (NZL)	3	3	2	8
11	Poland (POL)	3	2	4	9
12	Austria (AUT)	2	5	4	11
13	Argentina (ARG)	1	4	1	6
14	Ireland (IRL)	1	2	1	4
15	Yugoslavia (YUG)	1	1	2	4
16	Netherlands (NED)	1	1	1	3
16	Rhodesia (RHO)	1	1	1	3
16	Sweden (SWE)	1	1	1	3
19	Switzerland (SUI)	1	1	0	2
20	Belgium (BEL)	1	0	1	2
20	Italy (ITA)	1	0	1	2
20	Norway (NOR)	1	0	1	2
23	Czechoslovakia (TCH)	0	0	1	1
23	France (FRA)	0	0	1	1
23	Hungary (HUN)	0	0	1	1
Totals (25 entries)		73	73	70	216

== Medal summary ==
=== Men's events ===
Event	Gold	Silver	Bronze
60 m wheelchair 1A	Jan Erik Stenberg; Norway	Douglas Bovee; Canada	András Fejes; Hungary
60 m wheelchair 1B	Baumgartner; West Germany	Kazumi Ohashi; Japan	R. Zeyher; West Germany
100 m wheelchair 2	Gary Kerr; United States	Goldmann; United States	Barrett; Australia
100 m wheelchair 3	Frank Jespers; Belgium	Josef Greil; Austria	Stuewe; United States
100 m wheelchair 4	Raymond Lewandowski; United States	Terry Giddy; Australia	Rolf Johansson; Sweden
100 m wheelchair 5	B. Simpson; Canada	Gillette; United States	Ebo Roek; Netherlands
4×60 m wheelchair relay open	United States (USA); Gillette; Raymond Lewandowski; Stuewe; Donald Vandello	Canada (CAN); Walter Dann; F. Henderson; Eugene Reimer; B. Simpson	West Germany (FRG); W. Flach; M. Neikes; Schaupp; Johann Schuhbauer
Discus throw 1A	Edund Weber; West Germany	Rod Vleiger; United States	McNichol; Norway
Discus throw 1B	Patrick Reid; Jamaica	Julius Duval; United States	Tullius; West Germany
Discus throw 2	van Rensburg; South Africa	Graeme Marett; New Zealand	Joze Okoren; Yugoslavia
Discus throw 3	Graham Condon; New Zealand	Vic Renalson; Australia	Josef Greil; Austria
Discus throw 4	Eugene Reimer; Canada	Schoosleitner; Austria	Remi van Ophem; Belgium
Discus throw 5	Ray Clark; United States	Jacek Kowalik; Poland	Chaim Fliter; Israel
Javelin throw 1A	Edund Weber; West Germany	McNichol; United States	Richard G Holmes; South Africa
Javelin throw 1B	Julius Duval; United States	Raúl Di Paolo; Argentina	Wolfgang Koch; West Germany
Javelin throw 2	van Rensburg; South Africa	Josef Jager; Austria	Ron Halsey; United States
Javelin throw 3	Kleinjans; West Germany	David Williamson; United States	Daniel Erasmus; South Africa
Javelin throw 4	W. Flach; West Germany	Reno Levis; United States	Johann Schuhbauer; West Germany
Javelin throw 5	Rubén Ferrari; Argentina	Chaim Fliter; Israel	Ray Clark; United States
Precision javelin throw open	Ernst Michel; Switzerland	Reno Levis; United States	Vic Renalson; Australia
Shot put 1A	Edund Weber; West Germany	Hans Rosenast; Switzerland	Douglas Bovee; Canada
Shot put 1B	Julius Duval; United States	R. Muise; Canada	R. Zeyher; West Germany
Shot put 2	van Rensburg; South Africa	Ron Halsey; United States	Josef Jager; Austria
Shot put 3	David Williamson; United States	Daniel Erasmus; South Africa	J. Savage; New Zealand
Shot put 4	Schoosleitner; Austria	Johann Schuhbauer; West Germany	Dale Wiley; United States
Shot put 5	Horst Gotthelf; West Germany	Jacek Kowalik; Poland	Jerzy Skrzypek; Poland
Slalom 1A	Douglas Bovee; Canada	Rod Vleiger; United States	McNichol; United States
Slalom 1B	Rosenbaum; United States	Robert Ockvirk; United States	Daniel Jeannin; France
Slalom 2	Giuseppe Trieste; Italy	Goldmann; United States	
Slalom 2	Giuseppe Trieste; Italy	Schmicking; West Germany	
Slalom 3	Lars Lofstrom; Sweden	Roman; United States	Carlo Jannucci; Italy
Slalom 4	M. Neikes; West Germany	Tetsuya Matuso; Japan	Yasuhiro Fujikawa; Japan
Slalom 5	Shuji Sakamoto; Japan	Hideshi Oba; Japan	Robert McIntyre; Australia
Pentathlon 1B	Patrick Reid; Jamaica	Julius Duval; United States	R. Zeyher; West Germany
Pentathlon 2	Josef Jager; Austria	Schmicking; West Germany	Graeme Marett; New Zealand
Pentathlon 3	David Williamson; United States	Heinz Simon; West Germany	Terry Mason; Australia
Pentathlon 4	Eugene Reimer; Canada	W. Flach; West Germany	Reno Levis; United States
Pentathlon 5	Ray Clark; United States	Ed Owen; United States	Moll; West Germany

=== Women's events ===
Event	Gold	Silver	Bronze
60 m wheelchair 1A	Mayer; West Germany	Aria de Vries-Noordam; Netherlands	Karen Donaldson; United States
60 m wheelchair 1B	Rosaleen Gallagher; Ireland	Tracey Freeman; Australia	Andres; West Germany
60 m wheelchair 2	Pavla Sitar; Yugoslavia	Kathleen Fagan; Ireland	Krystyna Owczarczyk; Poland
60 m wheelchair 3	Barbara Howie; Great Britain	Binns; Canada	Emilie Schwarz; Austria
60 m wheelchair 4	Carol Bryant; Great Britain	Milka Milinkovic; Yugoslavia	Keyser; United States
60 m wheelchair 5	Rohne; Jamaica	Wiksen; Sweden	Rita Laux; West Germany
4×40 m wheelchair relay open	Great Britain (GBR); Carol Bryant; Pauline Dukelow; Barbara Howie; Marion O'Brien	West Germany (FRG); Waltraud Hagenlocher; Rita Laux; Martina Tschoetschel; Wenzel	Jamaica (JAM); Lewis; Nella McPherson; Rhone; Leone Williams
Discus throw 1A	Mayer; West Germany	Olga Ricchetti; Argentina	Sandra James; Rhodesia
Discus throw 1B	Tracey Freeman; Australia	Andres; West Germany	Broemmer; United States
Discus throw 2	Krystyna Owczarczyk; Poland	van der Schyff; South Africa	Kathleen Fagan; Ireland
Discus throw 3	Hattingh; South Africa	Eve M. Rimmer; New Zealand	Rosalie Hixson; United States
Discus throw 4	Le Roux; South Africa	Ora Goldstein; Israel	Darleen Quinlan; United States
Discus throw 5	Leone Williams; Jamaica	Swanepoel; South Africa	Malka Potashnik; Israel
Javelin throw 1A	Sandra James; Rhodesia	Joyce Murland; Canada	Olga Ricchetti; Argentina
Javelin throw 1B	Tracey Freeman; Australia	Rosaleen Gallagher; Ireland	Broemmer; United States
Javelin throw 2	Krystyna Owczarczyk; Poland	Slabbert; South Africa	van der Schyff; South Africa
Javelin throw 3	Rosalie Hixson; United States	Eve M. Rimmer; New Zealand	Kirn; United States
Javelin throw 4	Darleen Quinlan; United States	Maria Schitter; Austria	Milka Milinkovic; Yugoslavia
Javelin throw 5	Zipora Rubin-Rosenbaum; Israel	Malka Potashnik; Israel	Swanepoel; South Africa
Precision javelin throw open	Megumi Kawakami; Japan	Rosalie Hixson; United States	Hermina Kraft; Austria
Shot put 1A	Aria de Vries-Noordam; Netherlands	Sandra James; Rhodesia	Joyce Murland; Canada
Shot put 1B	Tracey Freeman; Australia	Andres; West Germany	Chmelova; Czechoslovakia
Shot put 2	Krystyna Owczarczyk; Poland	van der Schyff; South Africa	Slabbert; South Africa
Shot put 3	Eve M. Rimmer; New Zealand	Emilie Schwarz; Austria	Helena Ciapala-Zdunek; Poland
Shot put 4	Ora Goldstein; Israel	Le Roux; South Africa	Darleen Quinlan; United States
Shot put 5	Malka Potashnik; Israel	Zipora Rubin-Rosenbaum; Israel	Swanepoel; South Africa
Slalom 1A	Mayer; West Germany	Olga Ricchetti; Argentina	None
Slalom 1B	Broemmer; United States	Tracey Freeman; Australia	S. Long; Canada
Slalom 2	Yamahata; Japan	Cristina Benedetti; Argentina	Sharon Myers; United States
Slalom 3	B. Howie; Great Britain	Binns; Canada	Helena Ciapala-Zdunek; Poland
Slalom 4	Keyser; United States	Kawakami; Japan	Darleen Quinlan; United States
Slalom 5	Michiko Tanaka; Japan	Marion O'Brien; Great Britain	Gisela Hermes; West Germany
Pentathlon 2	Ruth Lamsbach; West Germany	Fetter; United States	Sharon Myers; United States
Pentathlon 3	Eve M. Rimmer; New Zealand	Rosalie Hixson; United States	Binns; Canada
Pentathlon 4	Marga Floer; West Germany	Ora Goldstein; Israel	Carol Bryant; Great Britain
Pentathlon 5	Marion O'Brien; Great Britain	None	None
