= Joyce Murland =

Canadian athletics competitor

Personal information
- Full name: Joyce M.K. Murland
- Nationality: Canada
- Born: 11 July 1937 Edmonton, Alberta
- Died: 19 January 2017 (aged 79)
Medal record
Representing Canada
Paralympic Games
Athletics
Silver medal – second place	1972 Heidelberg	Women's Javelin 1A
Bronze medal – third place	1972 Heidelberg	Women's Shot Put 1A
Bronze medal – third place	1976 Toronto	Women's Club Throw 1A
Bronze medal – third place	1976 Toronto	Women's Discus Throw 1A
Shooting
Silver medal – second place	1976 Toronto	Mixed Rifle Shooting 1A-1C

Joyce M.K. Murland, née Jacobi (11 July 1937—19 January 2017), was a Canadian world-class athlete known for her multiple international para sports medals including the 1972 and 1976 Summer Paralympics and for her world records in javelin, club and discus throws.

Murland advocated for para sports, participating in fundraising and public events through the BC Paraplegic Association. Her husband, John Murland, also contributed to the development of para sports through coaching, management and serving on the BC Paraplegic Association Board of Directors for 18 years. She was an innovator and contributor to the development of para sports in Canada and globally.

== Early life ==
She was born to Ernest and Katherine Jacobi on July 11, 1937, in Edmonton, Alberta. Due to C1 vertebra damage during birth, she had multiple surgeries throughout her youth resulting in walking with the use of crutches initially and later using a wheelchair. Her father, Ernest Jacobi, sought medical assistance for his daughter, though options in Edmonton at that time were limited.

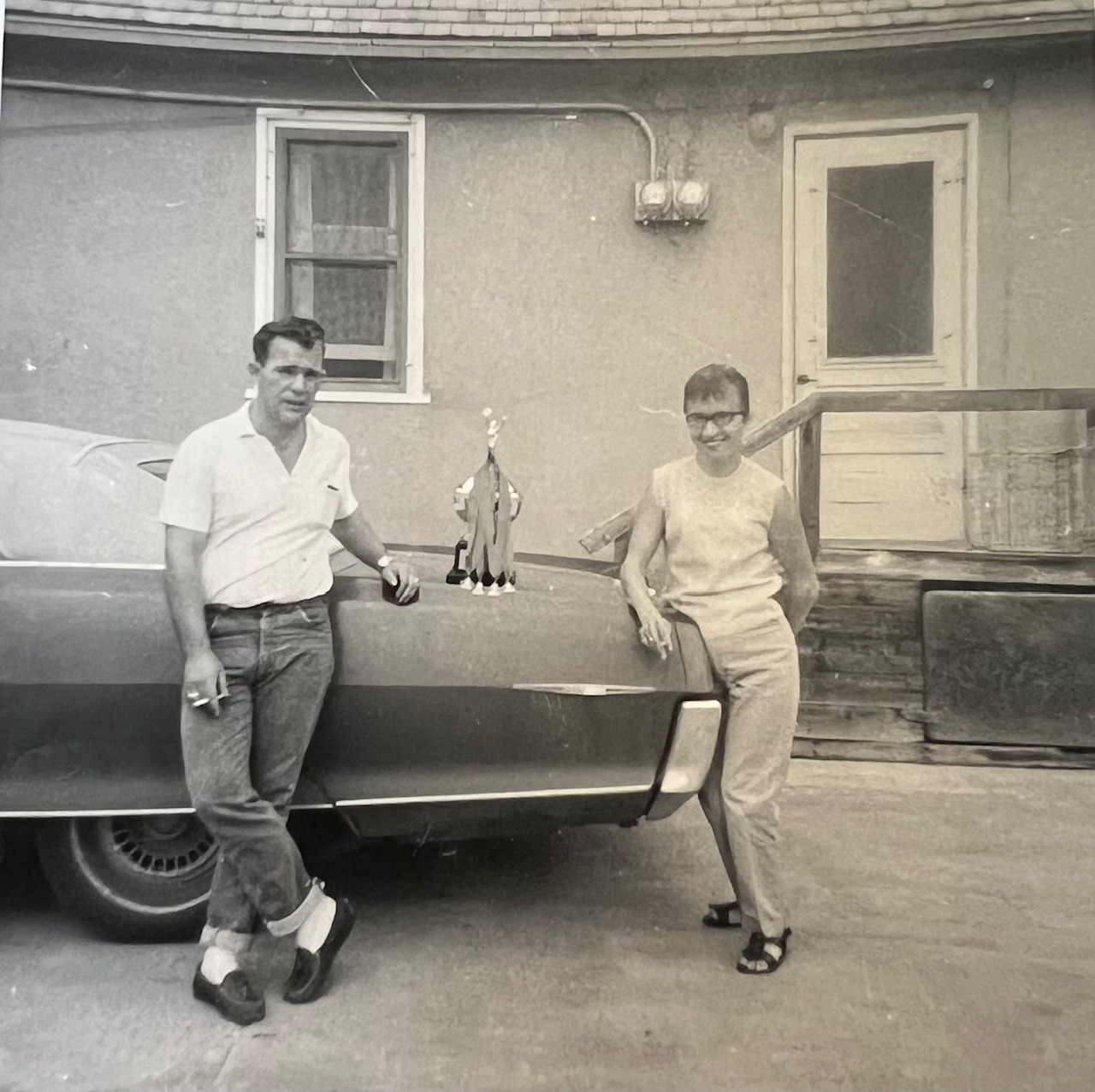
Joyce and John Murland with adapted 1956 Ford Fairlane

In the 1950s schools did not have accommodations to include paraplegic students in regular educational programs. Teachers and staff members helped by making appropriate spaces available to her. Of primary importance, her sister Erna Webster (née Jacobi) provided physical assistance so Murland could navigate the school. Murland successfully completed her education and graduated from Victoria Composite High School in 1956.

A pivotal moment in Murland's journey toward independence came at age 18, when her father custom-engineered modifications for her first car, a 1956 Ford Fairlane convertible in turquoise blue and white. The innovative system included a door spring and specialized plates for the gas and brake pedals, connected to her leg via a brace. She used this adaptation to drive for many years.

== Athletic Career Highlights and Specialties ==
Murland broke records in:

- the javelin throw at the 1971 Pan American Wheelchair Games in Kingston, Jamaica (Pan American Games record and unofficial world record);
- the club throw at the 1975 Paraplegic Olympics in Stoke Mandeville, England (world record); and
- the discus throw at the 1976 Canada Games for the Physically Disabled in Cambridge, Ontario (world record).

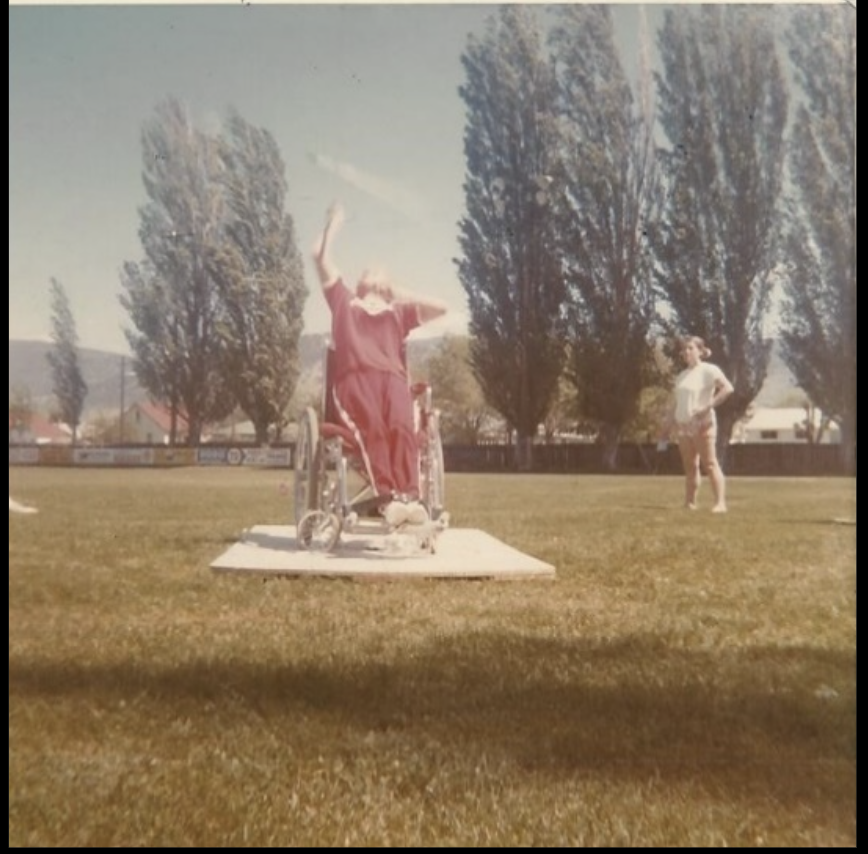
Murland javelin throw using adaptive technique

She brought home medals for Canada from the Pan American Games in Buenos Aires (1969) and Jamaica (1971); Paralympics in Heidelberg (1972); and Toronto (1976).

She started her athletic career with competitive rifle shooting, a sport she learned from her father. She was on the leading edge of the sport when shooting was introduced as a Paralympics medal sport in the 1976 Summer Games in Toronto, being one of only three women who competed out of a total of 37 athletes.

Javelin was her specialty. She adapted the traditional throwing technique to maximize the strength in her biceps. While seated in her wheelchair, she threw the javelin backwards over her shoulder, earning many medals and an unofficial world record.

== Athletic Record Details ==
Please note that the following list of significant athletics accomplishments is not entirely complete. Information about para sports in the 1960s and 1970s does not have thorough and accessible documentation. During these years athletes and other contributors to the sport were building its reputation, rules and disciplines. They were innovating the sport and some of the major events grew and transformed - some resulting in different names (which are noted here in as much detail as is available).

=== 1969 Pan American Games in Buenos Aires ===
- Gold: javelin throw 1-B with a javelin throw of 7.34 metres
- Silver: discus
- Silver: shot put
- Bronze: 40-metre dash class 1-B

=== 1970 Western Canada Wheelchair Games ===
- 2 medals: sharp shooting

=== 1971 Pan American Wheelchair Games in Kingston, Jamaica ===
Also known as the Pan American Paraplegic Games

- Gold: air pistol shooting
- Gold: discus throwing class
- Gold: javelin throwing class 1-B
- Silver: shot put
- Silver: 40-metre dash
- Silver: slalom
- Pan American Games record and unofficial world’s record: javelin throw of 24 feet one inch

=== 1972 Paralympics in Heidelberg, Germany ===
- Silver: women’s javelin 1A with a throw of 4.68 metres 9
- Bronze: women’s shot put 1A with a toss of 1.91 metres 9

=== 1975 Paraplegic Olympics in Stoke Mandeville, England ===
- World record: women’s club throw 1A with a throw of 13.41 metres

=== 1976 Canada Games for the Physically Disabled in Cambridge, Ontario (20—27 June) ===
- Gold: Discus Class 1A with a world record of 6.42 metres
- Gold: Javelin Class 1A with 4.96 metres
- Gold: Club Throw 1A with 10.25 metres
- Bronze: rifle event paraplegic class

=== 1976 Summer Paralympics (3—11 August) ===
Also known as 1976 Paralympic Games; Torontolympiad; Olympiad for the Physically Disabled.

- Silver: mixed rifle shooting 1A-1C
- Bronze: women’s discus throw 1A with a throw of 6.54 metres
- Bronze: women’s club throw 1A with a throw of 6.54 metres

== Personal life and education ==
Murland was married to John Murland, a strong supporter of her athletic career. The couple moved from Edmonton to British Columbia where they were both active members of the British Columbia Wheelchair Paraplegic Association. John served as an equipment manager and coach to the association and travelled with Murland to many competitions.

The Murlands moved to Lynden, Washington, in the 70s. There they designed and built a home customized to be accessible. It featured extra-wide hallways, fire doors, lower sinks and counters, and specialized openings under counters to accommodate a wheelchair.

In her mid-40s, Murland pursued higher education alongside her husband. She attended Western Washington University, where she graduated with a Bachelor of Arts in Psychology in 1982.

Murland initially worked in Edmonton as a bookkeeper for the Alberta Government Treasury. Many years later, while living in Lynden, she worked in the conservation department of Puget Power company's telephone switchboard before deciding to focus on other pursuits.
