= Francisco Benítez (swimmer) =

Spanish swimmer (born 1962)

Personal information
- Nationality: Spain
- Born: 26 March 1962 (age 64) Madrid, Spain

Sport
- Sport: Swimming
- Strokes: freestyle, backstroke
- Classifications: S6
Medal record
Men's swimming
Representing Spain
Paralympic Games
Silver medal – second place	1972 Heidelberg	100 m freestyle 6
Silver medal – second place	1972 Heidelberg	100 m backstroke 6

Francisco Benítez (born 26 March 1962 in Madrid) is a physically disabled S6 swimmer from Spain. He competed at the 1972 Summer Paralympics, earning a silver in two different swimming races.
