= Jon Brown (weightlifter) =

American paralympic athlete and weightlifter

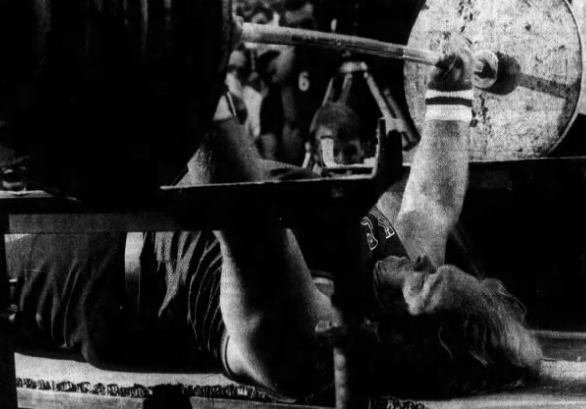
- Brown in 1976

Personal information
- Born: 1943 or 1944 (age 81–82)
- Weight: 228 lb (103 kg) (Note: Brown weighed about 228 pounds in 1976)

Sport
- Country: United States
- Sport: Para-athletics; Weightlifting
- Disability: Polio (Note: Brown contracted polio when he was young)
Medal record
Representing United States
Paralympic Games
Weightlifting
Silver medal – second place	1972 Heidelberg	Men's heavyweight
Gold medal – first place	1976 Toronto	Men's heavyweight

Jon Brown (born 1943/1944) (Note: Brown was 34 years old in 1978) is an American paralympic athlete and weightlifter. He competed at the 1972 and 1976 Summer Paralympics.

== Life and career ==
Brown was a watch repairman.

Brown competed at the 1972 Summer Paralympics, winning the silver medal in the men's heavyweight event. He then competed at the 1976 Summer Paralympics, winning the gold medal in the same event.
