= Karen Donaldson =

American Paralympic swimmer and athlete

Personal information
- Born: 1947
- Died: October 28, 2005 (aged 58)

Sport
- Country: USA
- Sport: Paralympic swimmer and athlete
Medal record
Representing United States
Event / 1st / 2nd / 3rd; Paralympic Games / 5 / 1 / 3
Paralympic Games
Women's para swimming
| Gold medal – first place | 1972 Heidelberg | 25 m Backstroke 1A |
| Gold medal – first place | 1980 Arnhem | 25 m Backstroke 1A |
| Gold medal – first place | 1980 Arnhem | 25 m Freestyle 1A |
| Gold medal – first place | 1980 Arnhem | 3x25 m Freestyle Relay 1A-1C |
| Bronze medal – third place | 1976 Toronto | 25 m Backstroke 1A |
Women's para athletics
| Gold medal – first place | 1980 Arnhem | Slalom 1A |
| Silver medal – second place | 1980 Arnhem | 60 m 1A |
| Bronze medal – third place | 1972 Heidelberg | 60 m Wheelchair 1A |
| Bronze medal – third place | 1976 Toronto | Slalom 1A |

Karen Donaldson (1947 – October 28, 2005) was an American Paralympic swimmer and athlete. She competed at the 1968 Summer Paralympics, 1972 Summer Paralympics, 1976 Summer Paralympics, and 1980 Summer Paralympics, winning five gold medals, one silver medal, and three bronze medals in total. gold medals in Women's 25 meters Backstroke 1A, and Women's 25 meters Freestyle 1A.

== Early life and education ==
Donaldson, born to American parents, spent her early childhood in England, where her father was stationed as a member of the Air Force. At age six, Donaldson suffered an unknown illness that resulted in her becoming paraplegic. Following her illness, the family returned to the United States, where Donaldson was treated at Walter Reed Army Medical Center. She began swimming as part of her treatment.

Donaldson's mother pushed for her to attend the same high school as her brothers, although she used a wheelchair.

She studied at Wayne State University.

== Sports career ==
While attending Wayne State University, Donaldson joined the Michigan Wheelchair Athletic Association.

At the 1968 Summer Paralympics in Tel Aviv, Donaldson won three medals: a gold medal in the 25m breaststroke, and silver medals in the 25-meter freestyle and 25-meter backstroke.

At the 1972 Summer Paralympics, Donaldson took gold in women's 25m backstroke 1a, and bronze in women's 60m wheelchair 1a.

At the 1976 Summer Paralympics, Donaldson won bronze medals in the women's 25m backstroke 1a and women's slalom 1a. She also competed in the 1a category for women's discus and club throw.

She competed at the 1978 Pan‐American Wheelchair Games, winning a gold medal in the 25meter freestyle in the 1-A category.

She was inducted into the Wheelchair Sports Hall of Fame in 1982.

== Personal life ==
Donaldson met and married Jack Donaldson while in college. The two later divorced, and Donaldson moved to Washington in 1992 soon after. There, she worked in the Information Technology department at Boeing.

Donaldson died from pneumonia at age 58. Noted by her family for her "strong will", Donaldson lived independently until the end of her life.
