= Norway at the 1972 Summer Paralympics =

- IPC code: NOR
- NPC: Norwegian Olympic and Paralympic Committee and Confederation of Sports
- Website: www.idrett.no (in Norwegian)

in Heidelberg
- Competitors: 28
- Medals Ranked 22nd: Gold 1 Silver 5 Bronze 4 Total 10

Summer Paralympics appearances (overview)
- 1960; 1964; 1968; 1972; 1976; 1980; 1984; 1988; 1992; 1996; 2000; 2004; 2008; 2012; 2016; 2020; 2024

Norway sent a delegation to compete at the 1972 Summer Paralympics in Heidelberg, West Germany. They sent twenty eight competitors, nineteen male and nine female.

== Medallists ==
Medal	Name	Sport	Event
Gold	Jan Erik Stenberg	Athletics	Men's 60 m Whellchair 1A
Silver	Bente Grønli	Swimming	Women's 3x35 m Medley 4
Silver	Bente Grønli	Swimming	Women's 50 m Freestyle 4
Silver	Harald Gunnerud	Swimming	Men's 50 m Breaststroke 4
Silver	Aase Klausen; Tora Lysø	Table Tennis	Women's Doubles 1A-1B
Silver	Vidar Johnsen	Weightlifting	Men's Lightweight
Bronze	McNichol	Athletics	Men's Discus 1A*
Bronze	Marit Berg-Holman; Herdis Warberg	Dartchery	Women's Pairs open
Bronze	Bente Grønli	Swimming	Women's 50 m Backstroke 4
Bronze	Henry Dahlgren	Table Tennis	Men's Singles 2
Bronze	Tora Lysø	Table Tennis	Women's Singles 1B

- *Not recognized anymore.

== Disability classifications ==
Athletes at the Paralympics in 1972 were all afflicted by spinal cord injuries and required the use of a wheelchair. This is in contrast to later Paralympics that include events for participants that fit into any of five different disability categories.
