= Irene Schmidt =

Dutch para table tennis player

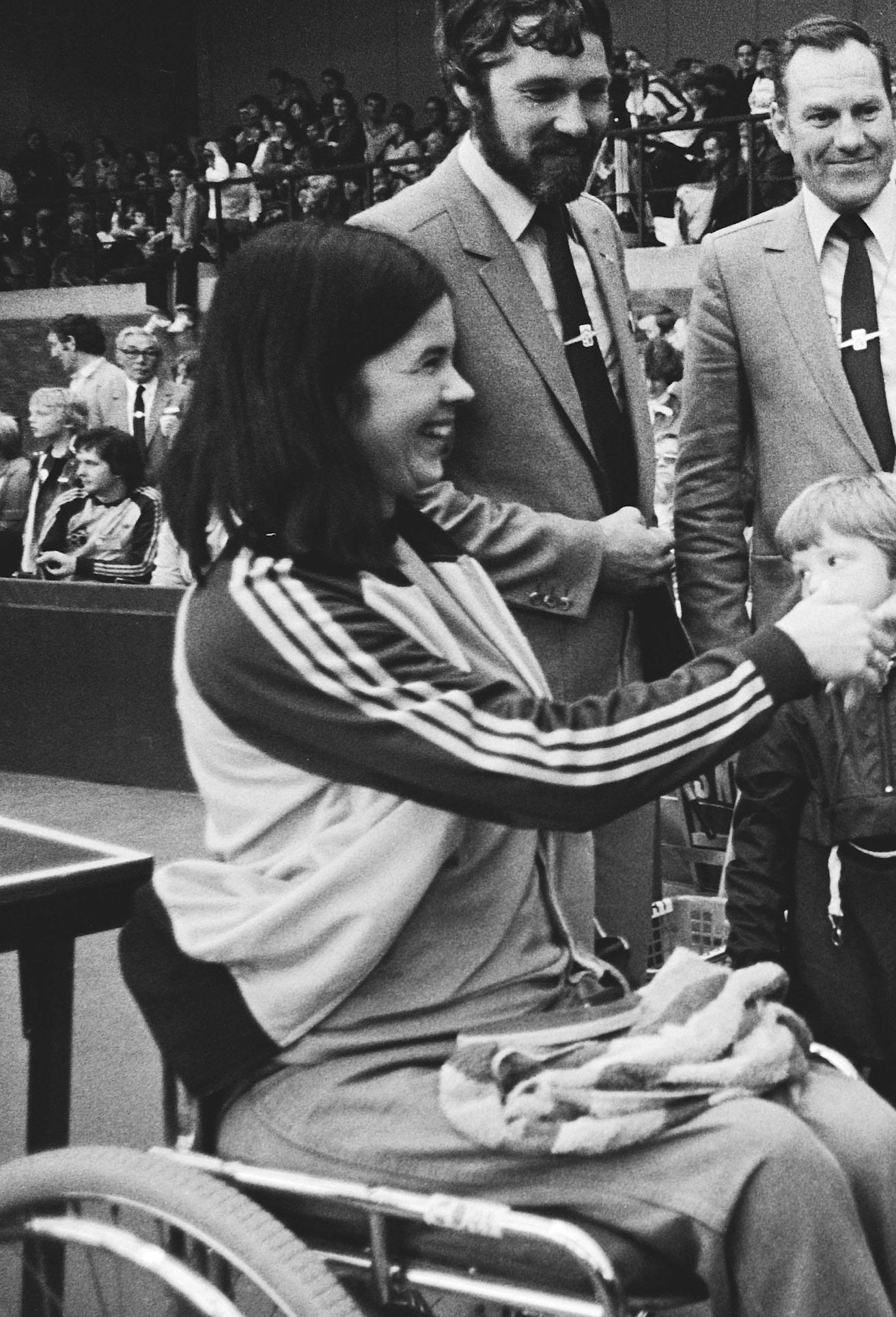
- Irene Schmidt in 1980

Sport
- Sport: Table tennis
Medal record
Table tennis
Representing the Netherlands
Paralympic Games
Gold medal – first place	1972 Heidelberg	Teams 4
Gold medal – first place	1976 Toronto	Teams 4–5
Gold medal – first place	1976 Toronto	Singles 4–5
Gold medal – first place	1980 Arnhem	Teams 4–5
Gold medal – first place	1980 Arnhem	Singles 4–5
Bronze medal – third place	1972 Heidelberg	Singles 4

Irene Schmidt is a retired Dutch table tennis player who competed at the 1972, 1976 and 1980 Summer Paralympics in the individual and team events. She won one gold and one bronze medal in 1972, two gold medals in 1976 and again two gold medals in 1980. After these Games she ended her sports career and married Theo Louwers.
