= Sharon Myers =

Former American Paralympic athlete, swimmer and wheelchair basketball player

Personal information
- Full name: Sharon Dawn Moore Myers
- Born: Virginia

Sport
- Country: United States
- Sport: Paralympic athletics Paralympic swimming
- Disability class: 1C, 2
Medal record
Paralympic swimming
Representing United States
Paralympic Games
Gold medal – first place	1968 Tel Aviv	25m freestyle 1
Gold medal – first place	1980 Arnhem	3x25m freestyle 1A-1C
Silver medal – second place	1968 Tel Aviv	25m breaststroke 1
Silver medal – second place	1968 Tel Aviv	25m freestyle 2
Silver medal – second place	1976 Toronto	25m backstroke 1C
Bronze medal – third place	1972 Heidelberg	25m freestyle 2
Paralympic athletics
Paralympic Games
Gold medal – first place	1976 Toronto	Slalom 1C
Gold medal – first place	1980 Arnhem	Discus throw 1C
Gold medal – first place	1980 Arnhem	Javelin 1C
Silver medal – second place	1976 Toronto	60m 1C
Silver medal – second place	1980 Arnhem	Shot put 1C
Silver medal – second place	1980 Arnhem	Slalom 1C
Bronze medal – third place	1972 Heidelberg	Slalom 2
Bronze medal – third place	1972 Heidelberg	Pentathlon 2
Bronze medal – third place	1976 Toronto	Discus throw 1C
Bronze medal – third place	1976 Toronto	Javelin throw 1C
Bronze medal – third place	1976 Toronto	Shot put 1C
Bronze medal – third place	1980 Arnhem	60m 1C
Wheelchair basketball
Paralympic Games
Bronze medal – third place	1968 Tel Aviv	Women's tournament

Sharon Dawn Moore Myers is an American retired Paralympic athlete, swimmer and wheelchair basketball player who competed at international elite competitions.

== Professional career ==
She is a four time Paralympic champion.
