= Marijke Ruiter =

Dutch Paralympic swimmer

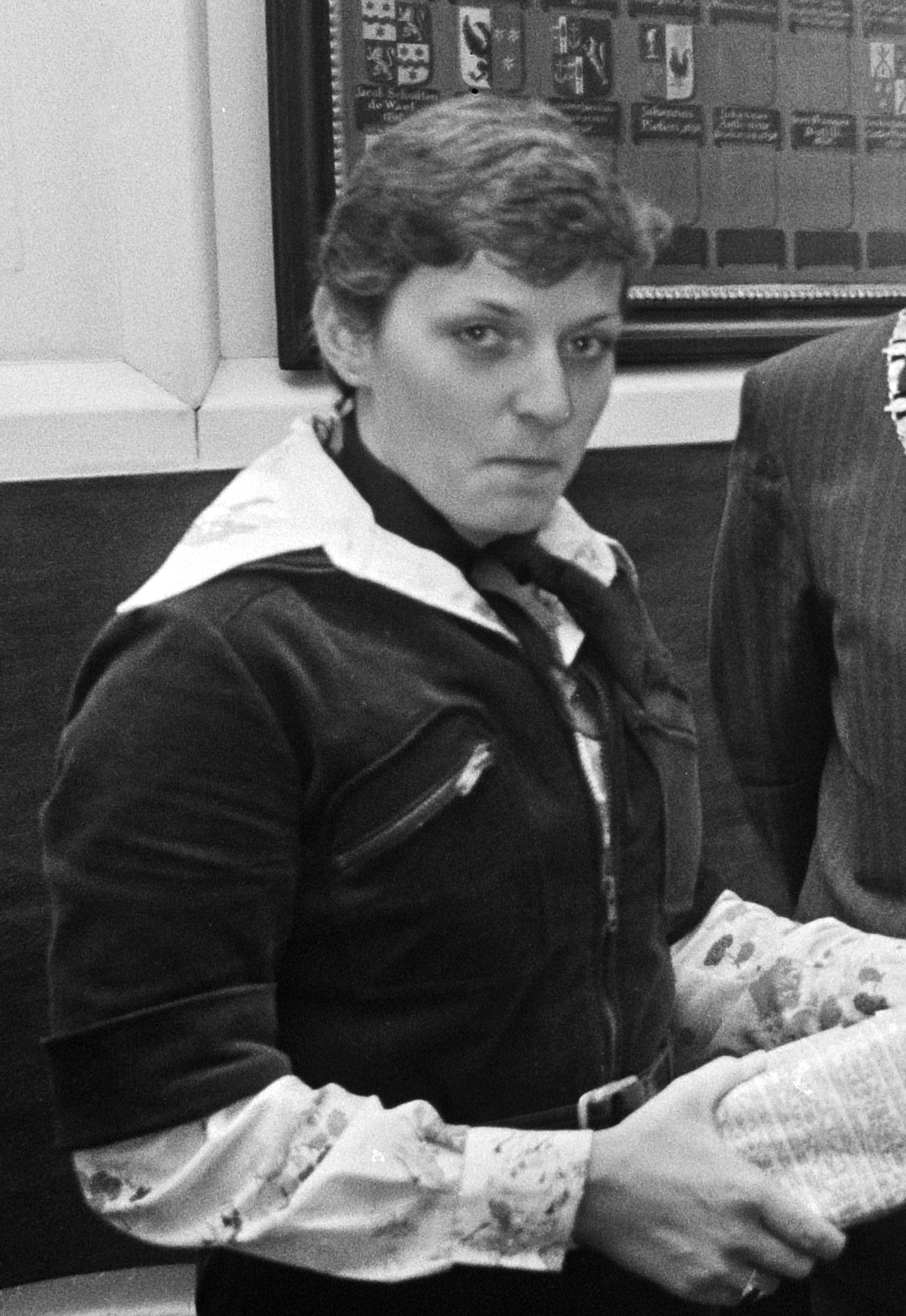
- Marijke Ruiter in 1976

Personal information
- Born: 1954 (age 71–72) Amsterdam, the Netherlands

Sport
- Sport: Swimming
Medal record
Representing the Netherlands
Paralympic Games
Swimming
Gold medal – first place	1972 Heidelberg	100 m backstroke 5
Gold medal – first place	1972 Heidelberg	100 m breaststroke 5
Gold medal – first place	1972 Heidelberg	150 m medley 5
Gold medal – first place	1976 Toronto	100 m freestyle 5
Gold medal – first place	1976 Toronto	100 m backstroke 5
Gold medal – first place	1976 Toronto	100 m breaststroke 5
Gold medal – first place	1976 Toronto	50 m butterfly 5
Gold medal – first place	1976 Toronto	150 m medley 5
Gold medal – first place	1976 Toronto	3×100 m medley open
Gold medal – first place	1976 Toronto	4×100 m medley open
Wheelchair basketball
Bronze medal – third place	1988 Seoul	Women's team

Marijke Ruiter (born 1954) is a retired Dutch swimmer who won 10 gold medals at the 1972 and 1976 Paralympic Games.

== See also ==
- Paralympic sports
- Sport in the Netherlands
