= Walter Dann =

Personal information
- Nationality: Canadian
- Citizenship: Canadian
- Born: c.1944 Vancouver, British Columbia, Canada

Sport
- Country: Canada
- Sport: Wheelchair Athletic
Medal record
Paralympic Games
Wheelchair Athletics
Silver medal – second place	1968 Tel Aviv	Tel Aviv
Silver medal – second place	1972 Heidelberg	4 x 60m Relay
- Updated on 17 August 2014

Walter Dann (born c. 1944) is a Canadian Wheelchair Athletics Athlete who has competed in the 1968, 1972 and the 1976 Summer Paralympics. He won silver in the Men's 4x60m Wheelchair Relay (with F. Henderson, B. Simpson and Eugene Reimer) and the Novices 60m Wheelchair Dash C.

He was born in Vancouver, before moving to Halifax, Nova Scotia. He contracted polio when he was three. He won the highest badge in scouting when he was 15.

== See also ==
- Canada at the 1968 Summer Paralympics
