= Snooker at the 1972 Summer Paralympics =

Snooker at the IV Paralympic Games
- Venue: Heidelberg
- Dates: August 1972
- Competitors: 8 from 6 nations

Snooker at the 1972 Summer Paralympics consisted of two men's events. The competitions were held at the sports grounds of the Institute for Sport and Sports Science of the University of Heidelberg and the National Institute for Sport in August 1972.

There were eight competitors, from six countries: three from Great Britain, and one each from Australia, Ireland, Italy, Kenya and the United States.

Michael Shelton won the gold medal in the men's paraplegic event, following his wins at the 1964 and 1968 games, and P. Haslam won the gold in the Men's tetraplegic competition.

== Medal summary ==
Event	Gold	Silver	Bronze
Men paraplegic	Michael Shelton; Great Britain	Jimmy Gibson; Ireland	Aroldo Ruschioni; Italy
Men tetraplegic	P. Haslam; Great Britain	Cliff Rickard; Australia	McGann; Great Britain
