= Goalball at the 1972 Summer Paralympics =

Goalball at the IV Paralympic Games
- Paralympic Goalball pictogram

Goalball at the 1972 Summer Paralympics was a demonstration sport. There were no medals awarded.
