= Finland at the 1972 Summer Paralympics =

- IPC code: FIN
- NPC: Finnish Paralympic Committee
- Website: www.paralympia.fi/en

in Heidelberg
- Competitors: 24 in 5 sports
- Medals Ranked 28th: Gold 0 Silver 2 Bronze 1 Total 3

Summer Paralympics appearances (overview)
- 1960; 1964; 1968; 1972; 1976; 1980; 1984; 1988; 1992; 1996; 2000; 2004; 2008; 2012; 2016; 2020; 2024

Finland competed at the 1972 Summer Paralympics in Heidelberg. It was the country's third participation in the Paralympics, and it sent a significantly larger delegation than for the previous Games. In 1960 and in 1968, it had been represented by a single athlete; for the Heidelberg Games, it sent 24 athletes (20 men and 4 women) to compete in five sports: archery, athletics, swimming, table tennis and weightlifting. This was the first time Finnish women had competed at the Paralympics.

Finns won two silver medals and one bronze, all in swimming. Matti Launonen swam in the men's 25m backstroke (category 1A). There were four competitors. Launonen finished in 46s, fast enough for silver; Great Britain's A. West (full name not recorded) took gold with a world record time of 40.6s. Finland's other medallist was Risto Liuska . In the men's 25m breaststroke (category 2), he was one of sixteen competitors. He was second fastest in the heats, in 26.3s, and advanced to the final, which he swam in 26.4s - just ahead of the Netherlands' Gerrit Pomp (26.8s). Great Britain's D. Ellis took gold with a world record time of 25.5s. In the men's 25m backstroke (category 2), Liuska was one of nineteen competitors. He finished third overall in the heats, in 26.4s, and advanced to the final, where a slower time of 27.4s was just enough to see off Ellis (27.9s) for bronze. Eric Boulter of Australia took gold in 25.4s, in a tight contest with Pomp (25.5s).

Although Liuska competed only in swimming, Launonen also entered events in athletics and table tennis. He competed in the javelin (finishing 27th and last in category 2, with a throw of 5.70m) and in the shot put (coming 11th out of 15 in category 1A, with a throw of 2.30m). In table tennis (1A), he entered the men's singles, and was eliminated 0:2 by Hans Rosenast of Switzerland in the first round.

== Medallists ==
Medal	Name	Sport	Event
Silver	Matti Launonen	Swimming	Men's 25 metre backstroke 1A
Silver	Risto Liuska	Swimming	Men's 25 metre breaststroke 2
Bronze	Risto Liuska	Swimming	Men's Men's 25 metre backstroke 2

== See also ==
- Finland at the 1972 Summer Olympics
