= Disappearance of Allison and Marie-José Benitez =

Mysterious disappearance of two women

Marie-José Benitez
- Disappeared: 14 July 2013 (age 53); Perpignan, France
- Status: Missing for 13 years and 24 days

Allison Benitez
- Born: Allison Benitez
- Disappeared: 14 July 2013 (age 19); Perpignan, France
- Status: Missing for 13 years and 24 days
- Parents: Francisco Benitez (father); Marie-José Benitez (mother)

Marie-José Benitez and her 19 year old daughter Allison Benitez are two women who disappeared on 14 July 2013 from Perpignan, in south-western France, under mysterious circumstances.

== Disappearance ==
The last time Allison Benitez was seen was when she met her father, Francisco "Paco" Benitez (born in Algeciras on 13 December 1963 and raised in Ceuta), a chief warrant officer in the French Foreign Legion, on 14 July 2013.

Francisco Benitez told the family's friends that his wife and daughter had gone on a trip to Toulouse and that their mobile phones were switched off. He did not, however, inform his wife's family. After several days with no contact, Allison's friends reported her and her mother missing to the police. Francisco Benitez reported them missing on 22 July.

== Investigation ==
The police were unable to find any evidence that Allison and Marie-José Benitez had travelled to Toulouse. Neither had a driving licence, and CCTV at Perpignan railway station yielded no trace of them. Investigators questioned Francisco Benitez, who explained that they had left due to marital difficulties between him and his wife. Forensic results showed that no calls had been made to either woman's mobile phones since their alleged departure on their trip, nor had there been any movements on either of their bank accounts. On 2 August, a preliminary inquiry was launched to "establish the causes of a worrying disappearance". All searches for the pair were fruitless.

The media attention on the case alerted the family of Simone Oliveira Alves, a Brazilian woman living in Nîmes who disappeared mysteriously in 2004, aged 28. She had been Francisco Benitez's girlfriend without realising that he was married. Francisco Benitez's double life was revealed and police were intrigued by the similarities in the disappearances. The case into Alves' disappearance was reopened.

== Aftermath ==
A few weeks later, Francisco Benitez uploaded a video onto the website of French magazine Paris Match to appeal for witnesses to help find his wife and daughter. He also proclaimed his innocence. On 5 August, he committed suicide by hanging himself in the Perpignan barracks of the Foreign Legion, after having called another of his mistresses who lived in Barcelona. It is believed that he was unable to bear the suspicion surrounding him.

In late 2013, forensic tests carried out at the barracks revealed traces of Allison Benitez's blood in a freezer and a tumble dryer. Francisco Benitez had cleaned the freezer and tumble dryer shortly after the disappearance, and so appears to be the prime suspect in what is believed to be a double murder. His alleged motive is that his daughter had discovered he was having an affair and was about to tell her mother. No trace of Allison or Marie-José Benitez, either alive or dead, has been found.

== See also ==
- List of people who disappeared mysteriously: post-1970
