= Netherlands at the 1972 Summer Paralympics =

- Flag of the Netherlands
- IPC code: NED (HOL used at these Games)
- NPC: Nederlands Olympisch Comité * Nederlandse Sport Federatie
- Website: paralympisch.nl (in Dutch)

in Heidelberg
- Competitors: 39 (26 men and 13 women)
- Medals Ranked 5th: Gold 14 Silver 13 Bronze 11 Total 38

Summer Paralympics appearances (overview)
- 1960; 1964; 1968; 1972; 1976; 1980; 1984; 1988; 1992; 1996; 2000; 2004; 2008; 2012; 2016; 2020; 2024

Netherlands competed at the 1972 Summer Paralympics in Heidelberg, West Germany. The team included 39 athletes, 26 men and 13 women. Competitors from Netherlands won 38 medals, including 14 gold, 13 silver and 11 bronze to finish 5th in the medal table.

== Disability classifications ==
Athletes at the Paralympics in 1972 were all afflicted by spinal cord injuries and required the use of a wheelchair. This is in contrast to later Paralympics that include events for participants that fit into any of five different disability categories; amputation, either congenital or sustained through injury or illness; cerebral palsy; wheelchair athletes; visual impairment, including blindness; Les autres, any physical disability that does not fall strictly under one of the other categories, for example dwarfism or multiple sclerosis. Each Paralympic sport then has its own classifications, dependent upon the specific physical demands of competition. Events are given a code, made of numbers and letters, describing the type of event and classification of the athletes competing.

== Medalists ==
Medal	Name	Sport	Event
Gold	Aria de Vries-Noordam	Athletics	Women's Shot Put 1A
Gold	Harry Lamberts	Swimming	Men's 100 m Freestyle 6
Gold	Marijke Ruiter	Swimming	Women's 100 m Backstroke 5
Gold	Marijke Ruiter	Swimming	Women's 100 m Breaststroke 5
Gold	Ingrid van der Benden	Swimming	Women's 100 m Breaststroke 6
Gold	Ingrid van der Benden	Swimming	Women's 100 m Freestyle 6
Gold	Henny Hilberink	Swimming	Women's 25 m Backstroke 2
Gold	Delphine van Opdorp-Ariens Kappers	Swimming	Women's 25 m Breaststroke 1B
Gold	Delphine van Opdorp-Ariens Kappers	Swimming	Women's 25 m Freestyle 1B
Gold	Mary Kuivenhoven; Ingrid van der Benden; Marijke Ruiter	Swimming	Women's 3x100 m Medley Relay 5-6
Gold	Marijke Ruiter	Swimming	Women's 3x50 m Medley 5
Gold	Ingrid van der Benden	Swimming	Women's 3x50 m Medley 6
Gold	Aria de Vries-Noordam	Table tennis	Women's Singles 1A
Gold	Loes Lekx; Irene Schmidt	Table tennis	Women's Teams 4
Silver	Peter Blanker; Popke Popkema; Gérard van Opdorp	Archery	Men's FITA Round Team open
Silver	Aria de Vries-Noordam	Athletics	Women's 60 m Wheelchair 1A
Silver	Peter Blanker; Popke Popkema	Dartchery	Men's Pairs open
Silver	Harry Lamberts	Swimming	Men's 100 m Breaststroke 6
Silver	Gerrit Pomp	Swimming	Men's 25 m Backstroke 2
Silver	Harry Lamberts	Swimming	Men's 3x50 m Medley 6
Silver	Mary Kuivenhoven	Swimming	Women's 100 m Breaststroke 5
Silver	Mary Kuivenhoven	Swimming	Women's 100 m Freestyle 5
Silver	Quirien Jonker	Swimming	Women's 25 m Backstroke 2
Silver	Netty van der Krieke	Swimming	Women's 3x25 m Medley 3
Silver	Quirien Jonker; Sonja Graveland; Netty van der Krieke	Swimming	Women's 3x50 m Medley Relay 2-4
Silver	Netty van der Krieke	Swimming	Women's 50 m Backstroke 3
Silver	Netty van der Krieke	Swimming	Women's 50 m Freestyle 3
Bronze	Popke Popkema	Archery	Men's FITA Round open
Bronze	Ebo Roek"Ebo Roek kon alles vanuit zijn rolstoel". BN DeStem (in Dutch). 2010-03-27.	Athletics	Men's 100 m Wheelchair 5
Bronze	Gerrit Pomp	Swimming	Men's 25 m Breaststroke 2
Bronze	Gerrit Pomp	Swimming	Men's 25 m Freestyle 2
Bronze	Jeanne de Backer	Swimming	Women's 100 m Backstroke 5
Bronze	Delphine van Opdorp-Ariens Kappers	Swimming	Women's 25 m Backstroke 1B
Bronze	Mary Kuivenhoven	Swimming	Women's 3x50 m Medley 5
Bronze	Sonja Graveland	Swimming	Women's 50 m Breaststroke 4
Bronze	Hans Pimmelaar; Paul Suijkerbuijk	Table tennis	Men's Doubles 1B
Bronze	Paul Suijkerbuijk	Table tennis	Men's Singles 1B
Bronze	Irene Schmidt	Table tennis	Women's Singles 4

Source: www.paralympic.org & www.olympischstadion.nl

== See also ==
- Netherlands at the Paralympics
- Netherlands at the 1972 Summer Olympics
