= South Africa at the 1972 Summer Paralympics =

- IPC code: RSA (SAF used at these Games)
- NPC: South African Sports Confederation and Olympic Committee
- Website: www.sascoc.co.za

in Heidelberg
- Competitors: 25
- Medals Ranked 4th: Gold 16 Silver 12 Bronze 13 Total 41

Summer Paralympics appearances (overview)
- 1964; 1968; 1972; 1976; 1980–1988; 1992; 1996; 2000; 2004; 2008; 2012; 2016; 2020; 2024

South Africa sent a team to compete at the 1972 Summer Paralympics held in Heidelberg, West Germany, from 2 to 11 August. They sent twenty five competitors, twelve male and thirteen female. The team won forty-one medals—sixteen gold, twelve silver and thirteen bronze—and finished fourth in the medal table.

Despite being banned from the Olympic Games, because of the policy of apartheid, since 1964 South Africa continued to participate in the Paralympics until 1976.

== Disability classifications ==
Athletes at the Paralympics in 1972 were all afflicted by spinal cord injuries and required the use of a wheelchair. This is in contrast to later Paralympics that include events for participants that fit into any of five different disability categories; amputation, either congenital or sustained through injury or illness; cerebral palsy; wheelchair athletes; visual impairment, including blindness; Les autres, any physical disability that does not fall strictly under one of the other categories, for example dwarfism or multiple sclerosis. Each Paralympic sport then has its own classifications, dependent upon the specific physical demands of competition. Events are given a code, made of numbers and letters, describing the type of event and classification of the athletes competing.

== Archery ==
South Africa entered five of its twenty five competitors, two male and three female. They won four medals, two gold and two silver.

== Athletics ==
Nineteen of the South African delegation entered athletics events, nine male and ten female. They won seventeen medals, five gold, six silver, six bronze.

== Lawn Bowls ==
South Africa entered two of its thirty seven competitors, both female. They won two medals, one gold and one silver.

== Swimming ==
South Africa entered nine of its thirty seven competitors, four male and five female. They won eighteen medals, eight gold, three silver, seven bronze.
