= Poland at the 1972 Summer Paralympics =

- IPC code: POL
- NPC: Polish Paralympic Committee
- Website: www.paralympic.org.pl

in Heidelberg
- Competitors: 22
- Medals: Gold 14 Silver 12 Bronze 7 Total 33

Summer Paralympics appearances (overview)
- 1972; 1976; 1980; 1984; 1988; 1992; 1996; 2000; 2004; 2008; 2012; 2016; 2020; 2024

Poland sent a delegation to compete at the 1972 Summer Paralympics in Heidelberg, West Germany. They sent twenty-two competitors, twelve male and ten female.

== Disability classifications ==
Athletes at the Paralympics in 1972 were all afflicted by spinal cord injuries and required the use of a wheelchair. This is in contrast to later Paralympics that include events for participants that fit into any of five different disability categories; amputation, either congenital or sustained through injury or illness; cerebral palsy; wheelchair athletes; visual impairment, including blindness; and les autres (French for "the others"), any physical disability that does not fall strictly under one of the other categories, for example dwarfism or multiple sclerosis. Each Paralympic sport then has its own classifications, dependent upon the specific physical demands of competition. Events are given a code, made of numbers and letters, describing the type of event and classification of the athletes competing.
