= Great Britain at the 1972 Summer Paralympics =

- Flag of the United Kingdom
- IPC code: GBR
- NPC: British Paralympic Association
- Website: www.paralympics.org.uk

in Heidelberg
- Competitors: 72 in 10 sports
- Medals Ranked 3rd: Gold 16 Silver 15 Bronze 21 Total 52

Summer Paralympics appearances (overview)
- 1960; 1964; 1968; 1972; 1976; 1980; 1984; 1988; 1992; 1996; 2000; 2004; 2008; 2012; 2016; 2020; 2024

Great Britain sent a delegation to compete at the 1972 Summer Paralympics in Heidelberg, West Germany. Teams from the nation are referred to by International Paralympic Committee (IPC) as Great Britain despite athletes from the whole of the United Kingdom, including those from Northern Ireland, being eligible. They sent seventy two competitors, forty seven male and twenty five female. The team won fifty-two medals—sixteen gold, fifteen silver and twenty-one bronze—to finish third in the medal table behind West Germany and the United States. Philip Craven, the former President of the IPC, competed in athletics, swimming and wheelchair basketball for Great Britain at these Games.

== Disability classifications ==
Athletes at the Paralympics in 1972 were all afflicted by spinal cord injuries and required the use of a wheelchair. This is in contrast to later Paralympics that include events for participants that fit into any of five different disability categories; amputation, either congenital or sustained through injury or illness; cerebral palsy; wheelchair athletes; visual impairment, including blindness; Les autres, any physical disability that does not fall strictly under one of the other categories, for example dwarfism or multiple sclerosis. Each Paralympic sport then has its own classifications, dependent upon the specific physical demands of competition. Events are given a code, made of numbers and letters, describing the type of event and classification of the athletes competing.

== Medalists ==
Medal	Name	Sport	Event
Gold	Barbara Howie	Athletics	Women's 60m wheelchair 3
Gold	Carol Bryant	Athletics	Women's 60m wheelchair 4
Gold	Carol Bryant; Pauline Dukelow; Barbara Howie; Marion O'Brien	Athletics	Women's 4x40m wheelchair relay open
Gold	Barbara Howie	Athletics	Women's slalom 3
Gold	Marion O'Brien	Athletics	Women's pentathlon 5
Gold	M. Cooper; Margaret Maughan	Dartchery	Women's pairs open
Gold	Gwen Buck; Irene Nowak	Lawn bowls	Women's pairs
Gold	Michael Shelton	Snooker	Men's paraplegic
Gold	P. Haslam	Snooker	Men's tetraplegic
Gold	Alan West	Swimming	Men's 25m backstroke 1A
Gold	David Ellis	Swimming	Men's 25m breaststroke 2
Gold	Carol Bryant	Table tennis	Women's singles 4
Gold	Barbara Anderson; Jane Blackburn	Table tennis	Women's doubles 1A-1B
Gold	R. Rowe	Weightlifting	Men's light heavyweight
Gold	Ron Parkin; Cyril Thomas; Terry Willett	Wheelchair fencing	Men's sabre team
Gold	Carol Bryant	Wheelchair fencing	Women's foil novice individual
Silver	Margaret Gibbs	Archery	Women's FITA round open
Silver	Barbara Anderson	Archery	Women's St. Nicholas round tetraplegic
Silver	Barbara Anderson; Jane Blackburn; Tommy Taylor	Archery	Mixed St. Nicholas round team tetraplegic
Silver	Marion O'Brien	Athletics	Women's slalom 5
Silver	John Ure	Lawn bowls	Men's singles
Silver	Tom Guthrie; John Ure	Lawn bowls	Men's pairs
Silver	F. Nowak	Lawn bowls	Women's singles
Silver	Alan West	Swimming	Men's 25m freestyle 1A
Silver	Alan West	Swimming	Men's 25m breaststroke 1A
Silver	William Thornton	Swimming	Men's 50m breaststroke 3
Silver	Men's team	Table tennis	Men's teams 2
Silver	Jane Blackburn	Table tennis	Women's singles 1B
Silver	Janet Swann	Table tennis	Women's singles 3
Silver	Women's team	Table tennis	Women's teams 3
Silver	Ron Parkin	Wheelchair fencing	Men's sabre individual
Bronze	Jane Blackburn	Archery	Women's St. Nicholas round tetraplegic
Bronze	Carol Bryant	Athletics	Women's pentathlon 4
Bronze	Pamela Barnard	Lawn bowls	Women's singles
Bronze	McGann	Snooker	Men's tetraplegic
Bronze	Richard Bates	Swimming	Men's 50m backstroke 3
Bronze	George Simpson	Swimming	Men's 100m backstroke 6
Bronze	George Simpson	Swimming	Men's 100m breaststroke 6
Bronze	William Thornton	Swimming	Men's 75m individual medley 3
Bronze	Pauline Dukelow	Swimming	Women's 75m individual medley 3
Bronze	Stephen Bradshaw	Table tennis	Men's singles 1B
Bronze	George Monoghan	Table tennis	Men's singles 3
Bronze	Paul Lyall	Table tennis	Men's singles 4
Bronze	Stephen Bradshaw; Tommy Taylor	Table tennis	Men's doubles 1B
Bronze	Men's team	Table tennis	Men's teams 4
Bronze	G. Matthews	Table tennis	Women's singles 2
Bronze	Gwen Buck	Table tennis	Women's singles 3
Bronze	Marion O'Brien	Table tennis	Women's singles 4
Bronze	Women's team	Table tennis	Women's teams 2
Bronze	Cyril Thomas	Wheelchair fencing	Men's épée individual
Bronze	John Clark; Cyril Thomas; Terry Willett	Wheelchair fencing	Men's épée team
Bronze	Sally Haynes; Janet Swann; P. Waller	Wheelchair fencing	Women's foil team

=== Medals by sport ===
Medals by sport
Sport	Gold medal	Silver medal	Bronze medal	Total
Athletics	5	1	1	7
Table tennis	2	4	9	15
Swimming	2	3	5	10
Wheelchair Fencing	2	1	3	6
Snooker	2	0	1	3
Lawn Bowls	1	3	1	5
Dartchery	1	0	0	1
Weightlifting	1	0	0	1
Archery	0	3	1	4
Total	16	15	21	52

== Archery ==
Great Britain sent fifteen athletes to compete in archery at the Games; British archers won three silver medals and one bronze medal. Anderson was Britain's most successful archer winning silver in the women's St. Nicholas round tetraplegic event and teaming up with Taylor and Jane Blackburn to win silver in the mixed St. Nicholas round team tetraplegic event. Margaret Maughan, who won Britain's first ever Paralympic gold medal during the 1960 Games, finished sixth in the women's FITA round open.

== Athletics ==
Great Britain's thirty-two athletics competitors won seven medals in athletics. Howie won two individual gold medals in women's wheelchair racing events and added a third gold in the 4×x40 m wheelchair relay. The winning relay team also included Carol Bryant who added an individual gold medal in wheelchair racing and a bronze in pentathlon. Philip Craven, who 29-years later would become President of the IPC finished 24th in both of his athletics events.

== Dartchery ==
Great Britain entered two athletes in dartchery, Margaret Maughan and M. Cooper competed in the women's pairs event and won the gold medal.

== Lawn Bowls ==
Five British lawn bowls players competed in Heidelberg, each won at least one medal. T. Ure won a silver medal in the men's singles and also won silver in the men's pairs alongside Guthrie. In the women's events Barnard and F. Nowak won bronze and silver respectively in the singles; Nowak also teamed up with Gwen Buck to win the gold medal in the women's pairs.

== Snooker ==
Three British snooker players competed at the Games, each won a medal. In the men's paraplegic event Michael Shelton won gold for the third consecutive Games. In the men's tetraplegic event Great Britain won gold and bronze through Haslam and Mcgann respectively.

== Swimming ==
Twenty-three British athletes took part in swimming events at the Games winning ten medals, two gold, three silver and four bronze. Three medals were won by A. West in men's 25 metres class 1A events, he took gold in backstroke and silvers in breaststroke and freestyle. Philip Craven finished sixth in the men's 50 metres breaststroke class 3.

== Table tennis ==
Britain entered eighteen table tennis players and won fifteen medals, two gold, four silver and nine bronze.

== Weightlifting ==
Three British weightlifters competed in the 1972 Summer Paralympics winning one medal. In the men's light-heavyweight division R. Rowe won the gold medal with a lift of 175 kg, Alan Corrie finished sixth in the same event with his lift of 132.5 kg.

== Wheelchair basketball ==
Great Britain entered teams in both the men's and women's events. The women's team lost both their group matches and failed to advance to the medal rounds. The men's team won three of their four group stage matches and advanced to the semifinals to face the United States. They lost the semifinal 36–52 and then lost the bronze medal playoff to Argentina meaning they finished in fourth place.
