= Switzerland at the 1972 Summer Paralympics =

- IPC code: SUI
- NPC: Swiss Paralympic Committee
- Website: www.swissparalympic.ch

in Heidelberg
- Competitors: 36
- Medals Ranked 19th: Gold 3 Silver 2 Bronze 4 Total 9

Summer Paralympics appearances (overview)
- 1960; 1964; 1968; 1972; 1976; 1980; 1984; 1988; 1992; 1996; 2000; 2004; 2008; 2012; 2016; 2020; 2024

Switzerland sent a delegation to compete at the 1972 Summer Paralympics in Heidelberg, West Germany. They sent thirty six competitors, thirty two male and four female.

== Disability classifications ==
Athletes at the Paralympics in 1972 were all afflicted by spinal cord injuries and required the use of a wheelchair. This is in contrast to later Paralympics that include events for participants that fit into any of five different disability categories; amputation, either congenital or sustained through injury or illness; cerebral palsy; wheelchair athletes; visual impairment, including blindness; Les autres, any physical disability that does not fall strictly under one of the other categories, for example dwarfism or multiple sclerosis. Each Paralympic sport then has its own classifications, dependent upon the specific physical demands of competition. Events are given a code, made of numbers and letters, describing the type of event and classification of the athletes competing.
