= United States at the 1972 Summer Paralympics =

- Flag of the United States
- IPC code: USA
- NPC: United States Paralympic Committee
- Website: www.teamusa.org/US-Paralympics

in Heidelberg
- Medals Ranked 2nd: Gold 17 Silver 27 Bronze 31 Total 75

Summer Paralympics appearances (overview)
- 1960; 1964; 1968; 1972; 1976; 1980; 1984; 1988; 1992; 1996; 2000; 2004; 2008; 2012; 2016; 2020; 2024

The United States sent a delegation to compete at the 1972 Summer Paralympics in Heidelberg, West Germany. Its athletes finished second to the host nation West Germany in the gold medal count and first in the overall medal count.

== See also ==
- 1972 Summer Paralympics
- United States at the 1972 Summer Olympics
