= 1972 Summer Paralympics =

Multi-parasport event in Heidelberg, West Germany

IV Paralympic Games
- Location: Heidelberg, West Germany
- Nations: 43
- Athletes: 984
- Events: 187 in 10 sports
- Opening: 2 August 1972
- Closing: 11 August 1972
- Opened by: President Gustav Heinemann
- Stadium: Heidelberg Thingstätte

The 1972 Summer Paralympics (German: Paralympische Sommerspiele 1972), the fourth edition of the Paralympic Games, were held in Heidelberg, West Germany, from 2 to 11 August 1972. Organised under the guidance of the International Stoke Mandeville Games Federation (ISMGF), they were known as the 21st International Stoke Mandeville Games at the time. The games ended 15 days before the 1972 Summer Olympics held in Munich, also in West Germany.

== Sports ==
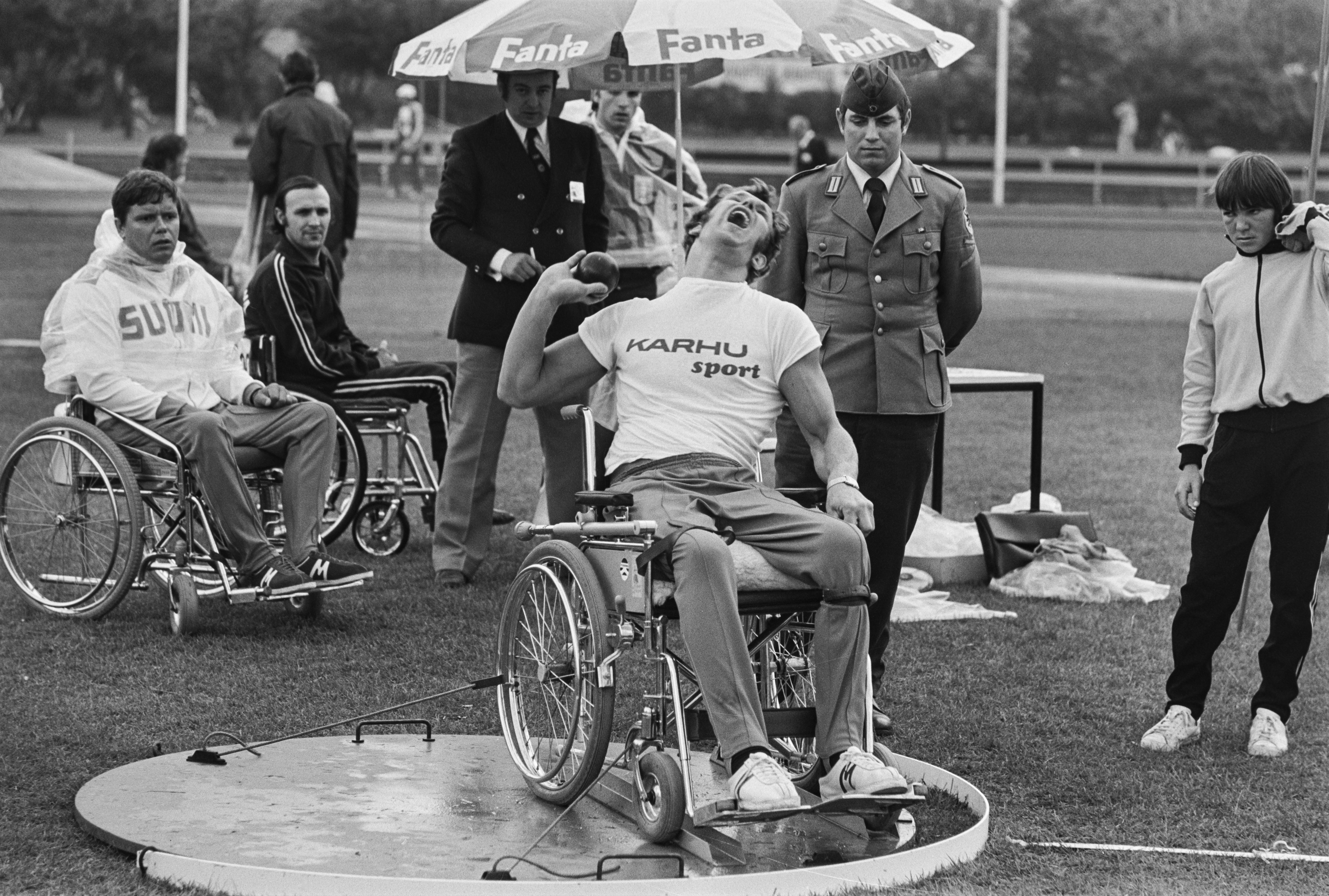
Shot putter in 1972 Summer Paralympics

As with previous Paralympics, the 1972 games were intended for wheelchair athletes only. However, demonstration events such as goalball and a 100 m sprint for the visually impaired allowed visually impaired competitors to participate for the first time.

- Archery
- Athletics
- Dartchery
- Goalball (demonstration sport)
- Lawn bowls
- Snooker
- Swimming
- Table tennis
- Weightlifting
- Wheelchair basketball
- Wheelchair fencing

== Medal table ==
The top ten listed NOCs by number of gold medals are listed below. The host nation, West Germany, is highlighted.

Rank	Nation	Gold	Silver	Bronze	Total
1	West Germany*	28	17	22	67
2	United States	17	27	31	75
3	Great Britain	16	15	21	52
4	South Africa	16	12	13	41
5	Netherlands	14	13	11	38
6	Poland	14	12	7	33
7	France	10	8	15	33
8	Israel	9	10	9	28
9	Italy	8	4	5	17
10	Jamaica	8	3	4	15
Totals (10 entries)		140	121	138	399

== Participating delegations ==
Forty-two delegations took part in the Heidelberg Paralympics. Bahamas, Brazil, Czechoslovakia, Egypt, Hong Kong, Hungary, Kenya, Malaysia, Mexico, Peru, Poland, Romania, Uganda and Yugoslavia competed for the first time. Between 1964 and 1976, South Africa was competing at the Paralympics for the third time. Although banned from the Olympic Games due to its policy of apartheid, it was not banned from the Paralympics until 1980, and West Germany, as host country, did not object to its participation.

Rhodesia competed for the last time. Its invitation to take part in the 1972 Summer Olympics was withdrawn by the International Olympic Committee four days before the opening ceremony, in response to African countries' protests against the Rhodesian government. But as the Paralympics that year were held before the Olympics (and between 1968 and 1984 organised independently), Rhodesia was able to take part in the 1972 Paralympic Games.

- Argentina (21)
- Australia (37)
- Austria (32)
- Bahamas (1)
- Belgium (23)
- Brazil (8)
- Canada (40)
- Czechoslovakia (19)
- Denmark (10)
- Egypt (1)
- Finland (24)
- France (61)
- Great Britain (73)
- Hong Kong (10)
- Hungary (5)
- India (10)
- Ireland (17)
- Israel (30)
- Italy (25)
- Jamaica (20)
- Japan (28)
- Kenya (4)
- Malaysia (4)
- Malta (8)
- Mexico (7)
- Netherlands (38)
- New Zealand (10)
- Norway (27)
- Peru (1)
- Poland (22)
- Portugal (11)
- Rhodesia (13)
- Romania (1)
- South Africa (25)
- South Korea (8)
- Spain (20)
- Sweden (38)
- Switzerland (36)
- Uganda (2)
- United States (66)
- West Germany (75)
- Yugoslavia (22)

Preceded by Tel Aviv	Summer Paralympics; Heidelberg; IV Paralympic Summer Games (1972)	Succeeded by Toronto
