= Australia at the 1972 Summer Paralympics =

- IPC code: AUS
- NPC: Australian Paralympic Committee
- Website: www.paralympic.org.au

in Heidelberg
- Competitors: 30 in 9 sports
- Medals Ranked 11th: Gold 6 Silver 9 Bronze 10 Total 25

Summer Paralympics appearances (overview)
- 1960; 1964; 1968; 1972; 1976; 1980; 1984; 1988; 1992; 1996; 2000; 2004; 2008; 2012; 2016; 2020; 2024

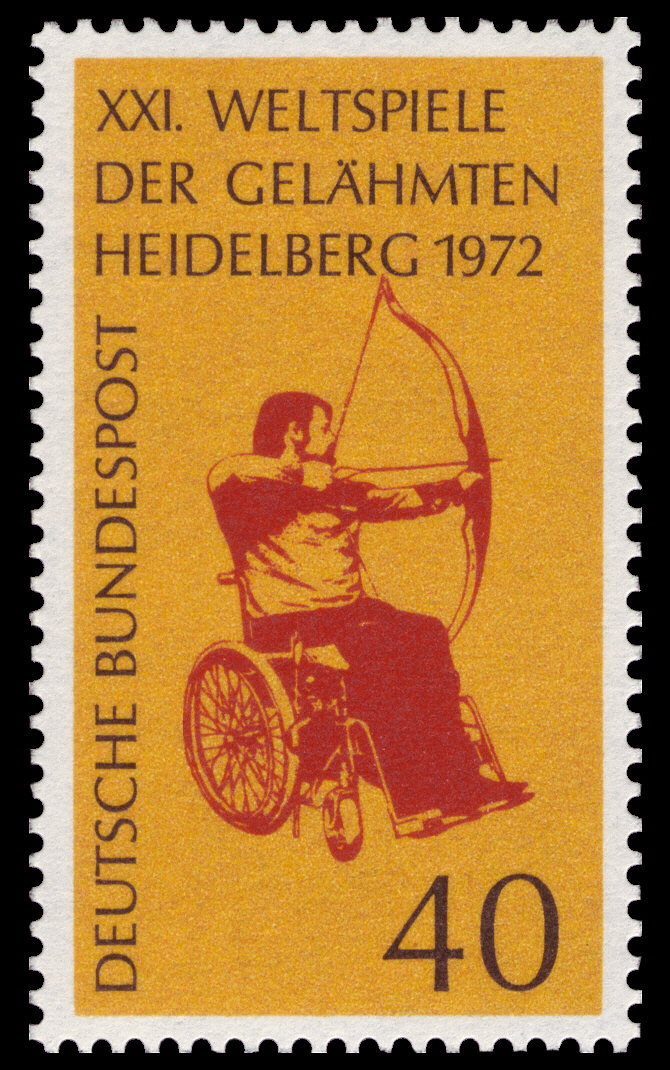
The logo of the 1972 Heidelberg Paralympics which, according to a member of the Heidelberg Organising Committee, was derived from the outline of a photograph of an unnamed local archer

Australia sent a team to compete at the 1972 Summer Paralympics in Heidelberg, West Germany. Australian won 25 medals - 6 gold, 9 silver, and 10 bronze medals in six sports. Australia finished 11th on the gold medal table and 9th on the total medal table.

The Australian team was part of the largest ever gathering of Paralympians, the 22 male and 8 female competitors took their place among some 984 athletes from 43 nations. The Australian team departed Sydney on July 27, 1972, had a three-day stopover in Hong Kong, and arrived on Frankfurt on July 31. The city of Heidelberg suited the Australian contingent perfectly. The team enjoyed significantly better accommodation than the underground carpark they had inhabited in Tel Aviv, and many were partial to the social happenings that centred on a large beer marquee erected in the athlete's village. This did not seem to affect their performances, however, with several athletes producing outstanding performances.

Notable Australian performances were:

- Tracey Freeman won three gold medals and two silver medals in athletics events
- Lawn bowler Eric Magennis, weightlifter Vic Renalson and swimmer Eric Boulter each won gold medals

== Background ==
Although the Paralympic Games were intended to be held at the same venue as the Olympics, the City of Munich's plan to immediately convert the Olympic Village into residential housing meant they could not share the same venue. Walther Weiss, a member of the International Stoke Mandeville Games Committee, proposed the games be held in Heidelberg, as it coincided with the 15th anniversary of the introduction of modern rehabilitation practices within the state of Baden-Württemberg. The Institute of Physical Training of the University of Heidelberg was selected as the venue. This was the last time that the Paralympic Games took place under the banner of the International Stoke Mandeville Games Federation.

Expectations were strong for the Australian team entering the Heidelberg Paralympics. As a result of their success at the 1970 Commonwealth Paraplegic Games, finishing second to England and winning 32 gold and 103 total medals, Australia was ranked among the top five nations for Paralympic competition. However, the standard of competition in the Paralympics was rapidly improving. At the midpoint of the games, Australian team captain Dennis Kay said of the competition, "We thought we were coming out with a very strong team, but the rest of the world has made tremendous strides."

Various fundraising efforts were required to allow the Australian athletes to compete at Heidelberg. Among these fundraising efforts were exhibitions from the ‘Amazing Wheelchair Wizards’, who would challenge local darts teams to tournaments and put on displays of trick archery shooting.

== Disability classifications ==
Athletes at the Paralympics in 1972 were all afflicted by spinal cord injuries and required the use of a wheelchair. These were the first Paralympics to include events for quadriplegic athletes as well as paraplegics. It was intended for there to be events for amputees at the Heidelberg Paralympics however owing to the required move from Munich to Heidelberg these events were not included in the program.

This is in contrast to later Paralympics that include events for participants that fit into any of five different disability categories; amputation, either congenital or sustained through injury or illness; cerebral palsy; wheelchair athletes; visual impairment, including blindness; Les autres, any physical disability that does not fall strictly under one of the other categories, for example dwarfism or multiple sclerosis. Each Paralympic sport then has its own classifications, dependent upon the specific physical demands of competition. Events are given a code, made of numbers and letters, describing the type of event and classification of the athletes competing.

== Opening ceremony ==
The opening ceremony was held on the University of Heidelberg sports ground on Wednesday, August 2, 1972 at 5pm. President of the Federal Republic of Germany, Gustav Heinemann, welcomed competitors and spoke of his hopes for the upcoming games, declaring: "It is my sincere wish that the games that are about to begin may demonstrate to the world what sporting achievements those people are capable of, who have to live with a severe disability; also that they may contribute further towards ending the questionable classification of the disabled as a ‘fringe group’."

Athlete Marga Flöer led the oath of the participants. The oath read:

"In the name of all competitors, I promise that we will take part in these games, rejecting and abiding by the rules which govern them, in the true spirit of friendship, unity, and sportsmanship for the glory of sport and the honour of our teams."

== Heidelberg and the Games ==
The athletes and escorts stayed in the Rehabilitation Centre, which housed twelve hundred people, and the remaining escorts stayed at a nearby trade school. The athletes were transported from the Centre to the Sports Ground by US Army buses that had many of the seats removed allowing space for approximately 20 wheelchairs. These buses ran continuously between the two locations and were also available to those wishing to go into Heidelberg for shopping or sightseeing, however, the opportunity for sightseeing was limited due to the difficulty of using a wheelchair on the cobblestoned streets.

Each night entertainment was enjoyed by hundreds of athletes and visitors until midnight in an Entertainment Tent at the Rehabilitation Centre. There were a variety of musical performances by traditional German bands, jazz bands, folk music and from competitors, especially by the Brazilian team with bongo drums. The organisers provided barbecued chickens and beer. Australian athlete Terry Giddy said everyone enjoyed the German hospitality, "They had this bloody big beer tent, you know, and everyone got into it... Um, but you sorta try not to do it the night before you're competing though so that was a sort of a, bit of a no-no."

== Team ==
The Australian team were selected at the 7th Australian Paraplegic and Quadriplegic Games held at Merryland Oval and nearby venues from March 12 to 18 1972. Supported by Holroyd Municipal council the performances at the games were of a high standard with 24 world records broken.

The Australian team captain for the 'Wheelchair Olympics', as they were popularly known at the time, was Dennis Kay. Kay, competing at his first Paralympics took part in the discus, shot put, javelin and weightlifting. Originally from Yorkshire in the United Kingdom, there was an ongoing joke within the team about the fact they had a former 'Pommie' as their captain.

| Athlete | Sport |
|---|---|
| Ray Barrett | Athletics |
| Eric Boulter | Swimming |
| Brian Chambers | Athletics, Swimming, Wheelchair Basketball |
| Alan Conn | Archery |
| Kevin Coombs | Athletics, Wheelchair Basketball |
| John Dwyer | Archery |
| Pauline English | Swimming |
| Pam Foley | Swimming |
| Roy Fowler | Archery |
| Tracey Freeman | Athletics |
| Terry Giddy | Athletics, Wheelchair Basketball |
| Cherrie Ireland | Athletics, Swimming |
| Robert Jordan | Wheelchair Fencing |
| Dennis Kay | Athletics, Weightlifting |
| Elizabeth Richards | Athletics, Swimming |
| Eric Magennis | Archery, Lawn Bowls |
| John Martin | Athletics, Wheelchair Basketball |
| Terry Mason | Archery, Athletics, Weightlifting |
| Robert McIntyre | Athletics, Wheelchair Basketball |
| Bob McMillan | Athletics, Table Tennis |
| Russell Morrison | Swimming |
| Hugh Patterson | Athletics, Wheelchair Basketball |
| Frank Ponta | Athletics, Wheelchair Basketball |
| Vic Renalson | Athletics, Weightlifting |
| Cliff Rickard | Athletics, Snooker, Table Tennis |
| Margaret Ross | Archery |
| Victor Salvemini | Archery, Athletics, Wheelchair Basketball |
| Elaine Schreiber | Athletics, Table Tennis |
| Pam Smith | Archery, Athletics |
| Tony South | Archery |

== Medalists ==
| Medal | Name | Sport | Event |
|---|---|---|---|
| Gold | Tracey Freeman | Athletics | Women's Discus throw 1B |
| Gold | Tracey Freeman | Athletics | Women's Javelin Throw 1B |
| Gold | Tracey Freeman | Athletics | Women's Shot Put 1B |
| Gold | Eric Magennis | Lawn bowls | Men's singles |
| Gold | Eric Boulter | Swimming | Men's 25 m backstroke 2 |
| Gold | Vic Renalson | Weightlifting | Men's heavyweight |
| Silver | Roy Fowler | Archery | Men's FITA round open |
| Silver | Terry Giddy | Athletics | Men's 100 m wheelchair 4 |
| Silver | Vic Renalson | Athletics | Men's Discus throw 3 |
| Silver | Tracey Freeman | Athletics | Women's 60 m wheelchair 1B |
| Silver | Tracey Freeman | Athletics | Women's Slalom 1B |
| Silver | Cliff Rickard | Snooker | Men tetraplegic |
| Silver | Eric Boulter | Swimming | Men's 75 m individual medley 2 |
| Silver | Pam Foley | Swimming | Women's 25 m freestyle 2 |
| Silver | Pam Foley | Swimming | Women's 75 m individual medley 2 |
| Bronze | Roy Fowler, Alan Conn, Tony South | Archery | Men's FITA round team open |
| Bronze | Ray Barrett | Athletics | Men's 100 m wheelchair 2 |
| Bronze | Vic Renalson | Athletics | Men's Precision javelin throw open |
| Bronze | Robert McIntyre | Athletics | Men's Slalom 5 |
| Bronze | Terry Mason | Athletics | Men's Pentathlon 3 |
| Bronze | Russell Morrison | Swimming | Men's 100 m freestyle 5 |
| Bronze | Russell Morrison | Swimming | Men's 150 m individual medley 5 |
| Bronze | Pauline English | Swimming | Women's 50 m freestyle 4 |
| Bronze | Pauline English | Swimming | Women's 75 m individual medley 4 |
| Bronze | Elizabeth Richards, Pam Foley, Pauline English | Swimming | Women's 3×50 m medley relay 2-4 |

Medals by discipline
| Discipline | Gold medal | Silver medal | Bronze medal | Total |
|---|---|---|---|---|
| Archery | 0 | 1 | 1 | 2 |
| Athletics | 3 | 4 | 4 | 11 |
| Lawn bowls | 1 | 0 | 0 | 1 |
| Dartchery | 0 | 0 | 0 | 0 |
| Snooker | 0 | 1 | 0 | 1 |
| Swimming | 1 | 3 | 5 | 9 |
| Table tennis | 0 | 0 | 0 | 0 |
| Weightlifting | 1 | 0 | 0 | 1 |
| Wheelchair basketball | 0 | 0 | 0 | 0 |
| Wheelchair fencing | 0 | 0 | 0 | 0 |
| Total | 6 | 9 | 10 | 25 |

== Events ==
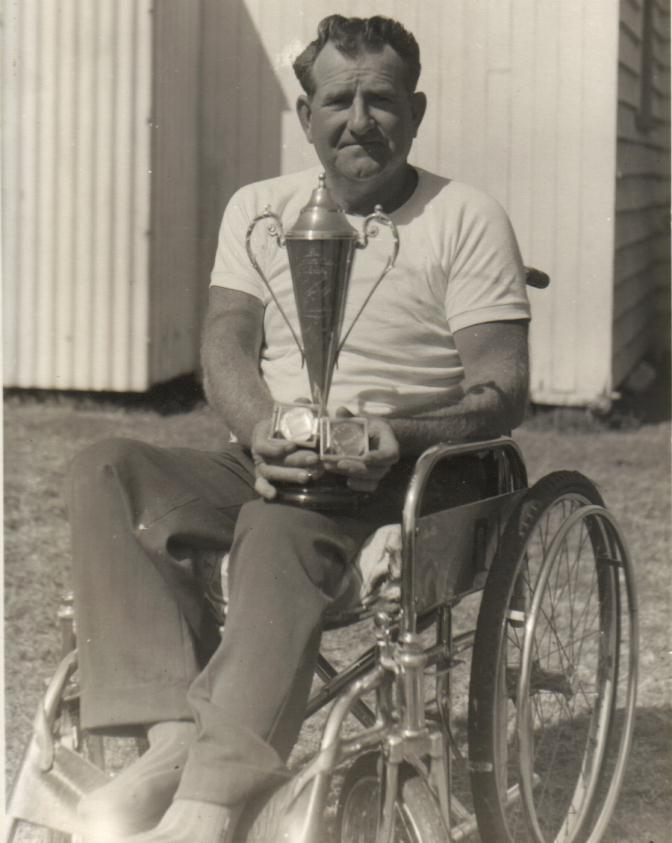
Roy Fowler, dual medallist in archery at the 1972 Paralympics, pictured holding a trophy and medals

=== Archery ===
Australia represented by:
Men - Alan Conn, John Dwyer, Roy Fowler, Eric Magennis, Terry Mason, Victor Salvemini, Tony South
Women - Margaret Ross, Pam Smith

The Australian archery team won one silver and one bronze medal. In the men's FITA round open event Roy Fowler took the silver medal with a total of 2158 points, trailing the West German gold medalist Hammel by 86 points. The Australian men's team of Fowler, Tony South and Alan Conn in the FITA round team open claimed the bronze medal behind the teams of the Netherlands and West Germany.

According to Tony South the athletes who medalled in Archery at the Games were Germans studying at University with a scholarship for Archery and had professional coaches, spotters and all kinds of support, whereas the Australian team had to carry all their own gear.

=== Athletics ===
Australia represented by:
Men - Ray Barrett, Brian Chambers, Kevin Coombs, Frank Ponta, Terry Giddy, Dennis Kay, John Martin, Terry Mason, Robert McIntyre, Bob Macmillan, Hugh Patterson, Vic Renalson, Cliff Rickard, Victor Salvemini
Women - Tracey Freeman, Cherrie Ireland, Elizabeth Richards, Elaine Schreiber, Pam Smith

The Australian athletics team won 11 medals - three gold, four silver and four bronze medals. The star performance was undoubtedly that of Tracey Freeman, who won three gold medals in the women's discus 1B, javelin 1B and shot put 1B along with two silver medals in the 60m wheelchair 1B and the slalom 1B. Freeman's performance in the discus was noteworthy as her throw of 9.50 metres smashed the previous world record by 0.93 metres. Vic Renalson was also successful, claiming silver in the men's precision javelin and bronze in the discus 3 along with his gold medal in the heavyweight weightlifting.

Terry Giddy finished second in the men's 100m wheelchair, 0.4 seconds behind American Raymond Lewandowski. Giddy later said of Lewandowski, "He was the first bloke I saw he had his wheels tightened straight so that it wouldn't deviate and they wouldn't wobble. And he beat me by, oh, be a cat's whisker... so that was a learning thing there."

Australia's further athletics medals included, bronze medals for Ray Barrett in the men's 100m wheelchair 2, Robert McIntyre in the men's slalom 5 and Terry Mason in the men's pentathlon 3. Frank Ponta had intended to compete in the Pentathlon as well, however due to a clerical error Australian officials failed to nominate him.

=== Lawn Bowls ===
Australia represented by:
Men – Eric Magennis

Eric Magennis won a gold medal in the men's singles over Ure from Great Britain and Koten from Italy. Competing in his first Paralympics, Magennis' gold medal was also the first for Australia in the men's singles event. Magennis went on to win further gold medals in the lawn bowls pairs at the 1976 and 1984 Paralympics.

=== Snooker ===
Australia represented by:
Men - Cliff Rickard

Cliff Rickard won the silver medal in the men's tetraplegic snooker event, finishing second to Haslam of Great Britain. This was the first time the event for tetraplegic (quadriplegic) athletes was held at the Paralympics and Rickard's medal was Australia's second in snooker after John Newton's bronze at the 1968 games in Tel Aviv.

=== Swimming ===
Australia represented by:
Men – Eric Boulter, Brian Chambers, Russell Morrison
Women – Pauline English, Pam Foley, Cherrie Ireland, Elizabeth Richards

The Australian swimming team won nine medals - one gold, three silver and five bronze. Eric Boulter was Australia's most successful swimmer. Australia's lone gold medal in the pool came courtesy of his performance in the men's 25m backstroke 2. Boulter won his gold with a world record swim of 24.3 seconds, beating Gerrit Pomp of the Netherlands. Boulter also claimed silver in the 3x25m medley 2 event.

Pam Foley was also successful, claiming two silver medals in the women's 25m freestyle 2 and 3x25m medley 2 events. Pauline English won a pair of bronze medals in the women's 50m freestyle 4 and the 3x25m medley 4 events while Russell Morrison claimed bronze in both the men's 100m freestyle 5 and the 3x50m medley 5 events. Australia's final swimming medal came in the women's 3x50m medley relay 2-4, with the team finishing in third place behind South Africa and the Netherlands.

=== Table tennis ===
Australia represented by:
Men – Bob McMillan, Cliff Rickard
Women - Elaine Schreiber

Australia competed in the Women's Teams 4 event. Australia were victorious over Japan, 3:1 and lost against Sweden and Great Britain with the score of 0:3 for both games. Therefore, Australia placed third in Group A and did not advance to the final round. The gold medal went to the Netherlands, silver to Sweden and Austria won the bronze.

Bob McMillan and Cliff Rickard made up the Australian team that competed in the Men's Teams 2 event. They lost against the Federal Republic of Germany and Switzerland 0:3 and 1:3 respectively. The Federal Republic of Germany went on to win the gold medal with Great Britain claiming the silver medal and bronze awarded to Sweden and Hong Kong.

=== Weightlifting ===
Australia represented by:
Men – Dennis Kay, Terry Mason, Vic Renalson

In the Men's Heavyweight category Vic Renalson defended his gold medal from the 1968 Tel Aviv Games and Dennis Kay finished in seventh. Terry Mason competed in the Men's Light-Featherweight category and finished fourth out of eleven competitors.

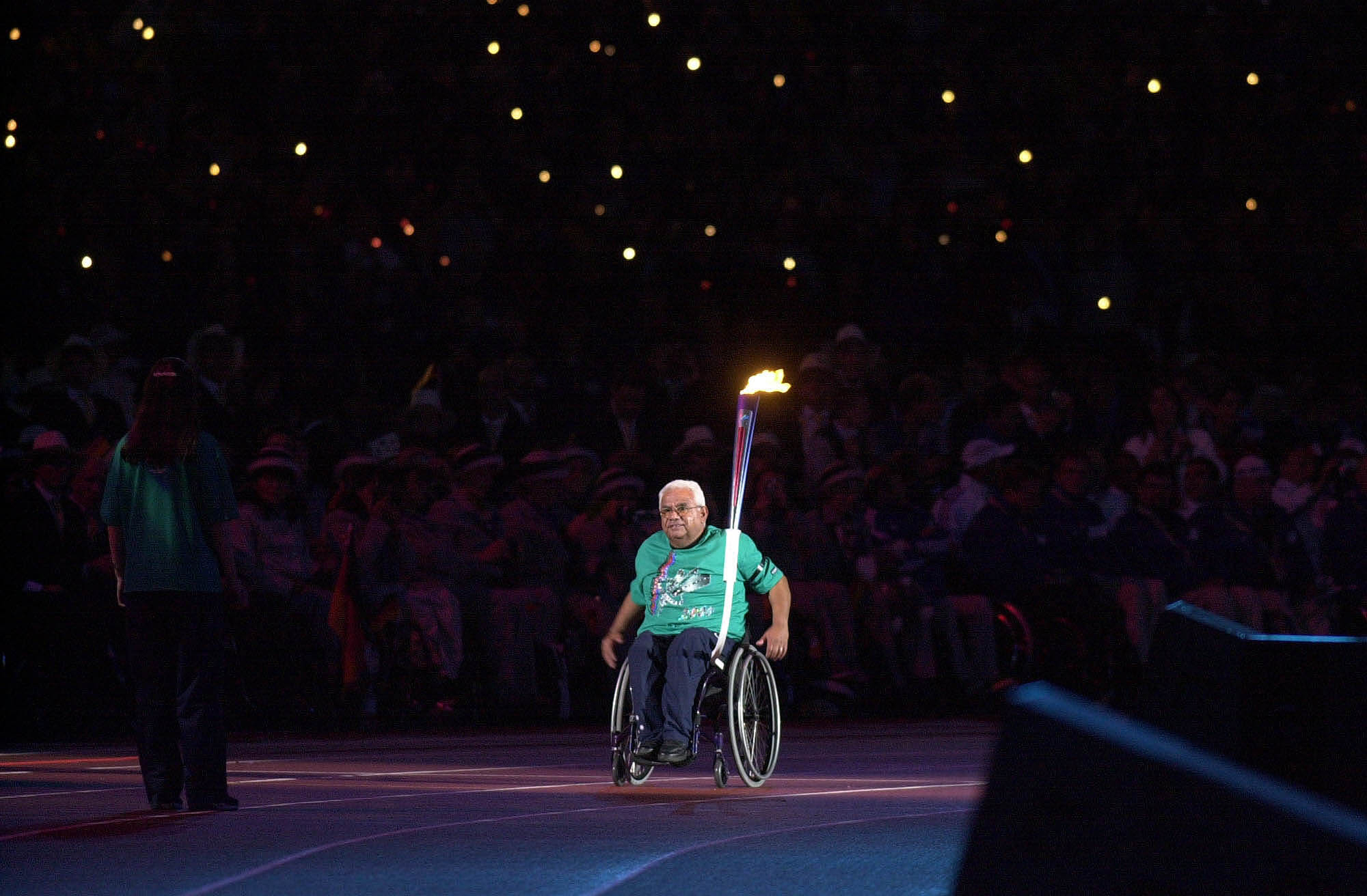
Wheelchair basketball captain and coach at the Opening Ceremony of the Sydney Paralympics in 2000.

=== Wheelchair basketball ===
Australia represented by:
Men - Brian Chambers, Kevin Coombs, Terry Giddy, John Martin, Robert McIntyre, Hugh Patterson, Frank Ponta, Victor Salvemini

In the preliminary rounds, Australia were defeated by eventual gold medalists United States 85 to 29; silver medalists, Israel, 101 to 36 and France 74 to 53. As a result, the team did not advance in the competition and finished in 8th position. Kevin Coombs was the team captain and coach however, found it difficult to manage. In his book, A Fortunate Accident, Coombs acknowledges, "I tried to coach but I was overawed. When you're coaching against the best in the world and trying to play and be the best as well...it was just bit much for me. One of the senior players, Frankie Ponta, and Mike Wilson, who was our team manager, took over." Player John Martain cut his hand on the push rim of his wheelchair, in one of the early wheelchair basketball games, which ended his campaign. The geographical distance of Australia from other competitive countries was a disadvantage to the team due to the lack of opportunity for international competition that is readily available to other countries.

The final between Israel and the USA is regarded as one of the highlights of the Games. With 13 seconds of the match remaining the Israelis held a three-point lead but USA fought back to win 59 to 58.

=== Wheelchair fencing ===
Australia represented by:
Men – Robert Jordan

Robert Jordan competed in the Men's Foil Novice Individual event. In the preliminaries he competed in Pool 2 winning two of five events and as a result did not advance to the next round. The gold medal was won by Vittorio Paradiso of Italy.

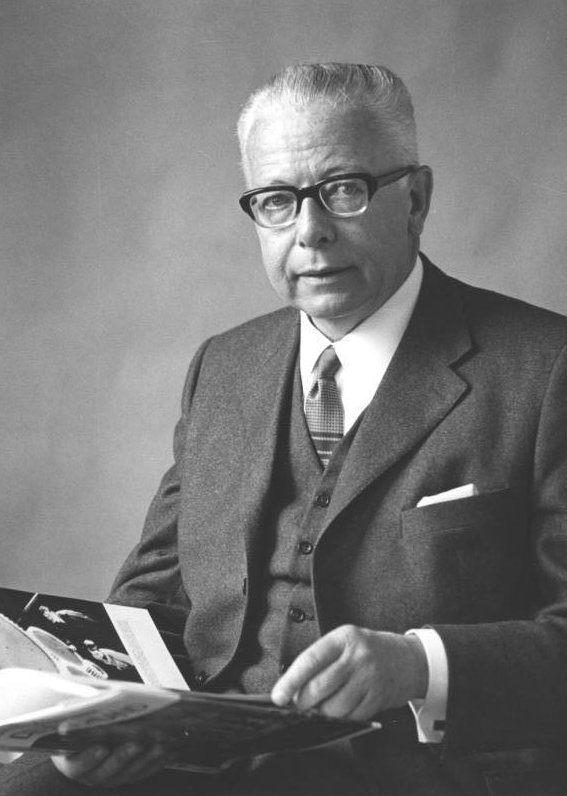
Founder of the Stoke Mandeville and Paralympic Games, Sir Ludwig Gutmann.

== Closing ceremony ==
The closing ceremony was staged on Wednesday, August 9, 1972 in the marquee where entertainment had been held throughout the games. Cups and trophies were presented to individual winners and the captains of winning teams. The speakers at the ceremony were Vice-Chancellor and Minister for Foreign Affairs Walter Scheel, Mayor of Heidelberg Reinhold Zundel and Sir Ludwig Gutmann, who officially declared the games closed.

== See also ==
- Australia at the 1964 Summer Paralympics
- Australia at the 1968 Summer Paralympics
- Australia at the 1976 Summer Paralympics
- Australia at the 1980 Summer Paralympics
