= List of Commonwealth Games venues =

The following are lists of all Commonwealth Games venues, starting with the first Commonwealth Games in 1930 and the first Commonwealth Youth Games in 2000 alphabetically, by sport and by year.

As a multi-sport event, competitions held during a given the Commonwealth Games usually take place in venue across the host city and its metropolitan area. Some Commonwealth competitions may be held outside the host metropolitan area, and in other regions of the host country.

Usually a specific venue is designated as the main stadium of the games. Traditionally as at the Summer Olympic Games, the opening and closing ceremonies and the Athletics competitions are held in this Stadium.

There were also 3 Commonwealth Winter Games held in St Moritz 2 years after the summer Commonwealth Games, and 4 Commonwealth Paraplegic Games held immediately before and after the summer Commonwealth Games. Both events have now been discontinued, but since 2002 athletes with a disability have competed as full members of their nation teams at the Commonwealth Games.

== Commonwealth Games ==
Year	City	Country
1930	Hamilton	Canada
1934	London	England
1938	Sydney	Australia
1950	Auckland	New Zealand
1954	Vancouver	Canada
1958	Cardiff	Wales
1962	Perth	Australia
1966	Kingston	Jamaica
1970	Edinburgh	Scotland
1974	Christchurch	New Zealand
1978	Edmonton	Canada
1982	Brisbane	Australia
1986	Edinburgh	Scotland
1990	Auckland	New Zealand
1994	Victoria	Canada
1998	Kuala Lumpur	Malaysia
2002	Manchester	England
2006	Melbourne	Australia
2010	Delhi	India
2014	Glasgow	Scotland
2018	Gold Coast	Australia
2022	Birmingham	England
2026	Glasgow	Scotland
2030	Amdavad	India

== Commonwealth Youth Games ==
Year	City	Country
2000	Edinburgh	Scotland
2004	Bendigo	Australia
2008	Pune	India
2011	Isle of Man	Isle of Man
2015	Apia	Samoa
2017	Nassau	Bahamas
2023	Port of Spain	Trinidad and Tobago
2027	Malta	Malta

== Commonwealth Paraplegic Games ==
Year	City	Country
1962	Perth	Australia
1966	Kingston	Jamaica
1970	Edinburgh	Scotland
1974	Dunedin	New Zealand

== Commonwealth Winter Games ==
Year	City	Country
1958	St. Moritz	Switzerland
1962	St. Moritz	Switzerland
1966	St. Moritz	Switzerland
2010 (cancelled)	Gulmarg	India

== See also ==
- List of Olympic venues
- List of stadiums in Canada
