= Commonwealth Games sports =

Sports officially recognised by the Commonwealth Sport

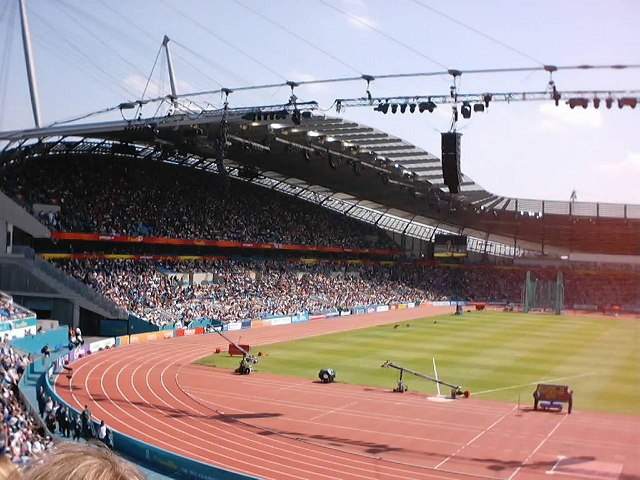
Sports for elite athletes with a disability were fully incorporated at the 2002 Manchester Games.

The Commonwealth Games sports comprise all the sports officially recognised and approved by the Commonwealth Sport. There are a total of 2 sports and para-sports that are competed at every games. In addition, the CGF allow organising committees to choose from various optional sports and disciplines to complete their games' program.

At the 1930 British Empire Games, the precursor to the modern Games, there were six sports: athletics, aquatics (swimming and diving), boxing, lawn bowls, rowing, and wrestling.

== Sports, disciplines, events ==
If a number of activities are controlled by the same international federation then the Commonwealth Games Federation recognises each activity as a discipline, which belongs to the respective sport. For example, shooting, which is organised by the International Shooting Sport Federation, is a sport at the Commonwealth Games that comprises four disciplines: clay target, full bore, pistol, and small bore. Furthermore, events for elite athletes with a disability (EAD) comprise a separate discipline within a sport from events for able-bodied athletes. This is the case both for sports where events for EAD and able-bodied athletes are organised by the different federations, as with athletics and World Athletics and the International Paralympic Committee, and for sports where there is a single federation, as with lawn bowls and the World Bowls.

== Types ==
Between 1998 and 2022, the Commonwealth Games sports are divided into three main types: core sports, optional sports, and recognised sports. Until 2022, sixteen core sports and four core para-sports must be included in the Games program, while the host nation may choose to include a number of optional sports and disciplines. Recognised sports are sports which have been approved by the CGF but are deemed to need further growth before their inclusion. The host nation may also apply for the inclusion of a maximum of four team sports to the CGF General Assembly, as the Melbourne organising committee did with basketball for the 2006 Games and Gold Coast did with beach volleyball for the 2018 Games.

The CGF recognises Commonwealth Games records for a number of sports. In 2002, the CGF introduced the David Dixon Award for the outstanding athlete of the Games.

=== Core, Optional and Local Demands Commonwealth Games program ===
The following sports (or disciplines of a sport) make up the core, optional and discontinued Commonwealth Games official program and are listed alphabetically according to the name used by the CGF. The figures in each cell indicate the number of events for each sport contested at the respective Games; a bullet (•) denotes that the sport was contested as a demonstration sport. The Commonwealth Games Charter requires games to include 20 core sports, disciplines and para-sports.

Para-sports were first included in the official program as demonstration sports in 1994 before being fully integrated into the main program in 2002. Between 1962 and 1974, Commonwealth Paraplegic Games were organised directly preceding the able body games; a "p" below denotes that a para-sport was part of the Paraplegic Games program for that year.

Eleven sports consist or have consisted of multiple disciplines. Disciplines from the same sport are grouped under the same color:

Aquatics – Archery – Athletics – Basketball – Cycling – Gymnastics – Lawn bowls – Shooting – Table tennis – Triathlon – Wrestling

Sport (Discipline)	Body	11	30	34	38	50	54	58	62	66	70	74	78	82	86	90	94	98	02	06	10	14	18	22	26	30
Current core sports
Swimming	WAqua	2	11	13	13	13	13	15	23	24	29	29	29	29	30	32	32	32	38	38	38	38	38	38	42	X
Swimming (para)	IPC								p	p	p	p					2		4	4	6	6	12	14	14	X
Athletics	WAthle	5	21	30	28	28	29	29	31	34	36	37	38	40	41	42	41	46	46	47	46	44	46	45	43	X
Athletics (para)	IPC								p	p	p	p					2		2	6	6	6	12	13	16	X
Road cycling	UCI				1	1	1	1	1	1	1	1	1	2	2	3	4	4	4	4	4	4	4	4		
Artistic gymnastics	WG											•	4			15	14	14	15	14	14	14	14	14	14	X
Lawn bowls (Note: Indoor Bowls will be held at the 2026 Games instead of Lawn Bowls.)	WBowls		3	3	3	3	3	3	3		3	3	3	4	6	6	6	6	6	6	6	8	8	8	4	X
Lawn bowls (para)	WBowls										p	p					2		2			2	2	3	3	X
Table tennis	ITTF													•					7	7	7	7	7	7		X
Triathlon	WT															•			2	2		3	3	3		
Freestyle wrestling	UWW	1	7	7	7	8	8	8	8	8	10	10	10	10	10		10		7		14	14	12	12		
Badminton	BWF									5	5	5	6	6	6	6	6	7	6	6	6	6	6	6		
Boxing	WBoxing	1	8	8	8	8	10	10	10	10	11	11	11	11	12	12	12	12	12	11	10	13	16	16	14	X
Field hockey	FIH																	2	2	2	2	2	2	2		X
Judo	IJF														14	16			14			14		14	14	
Netball	WN															•		1	1	1	1	1	1	1	1	X
Powerlifting (para)	IPC																		1	1	2	4	4	4	4	X
Rugby sevens	WRugby																	1	1	1	1	1	2	2		
Squash	WS																	5	5	5	5	5	5	5		
Weightlifting	IWF					6	7	7	7	7	9	9	10	10	10	30	30	24	45	15	15	15	16	16	16	X
Current optional sports
Diving	WAqua		4	4	4	4	4	4	4	4	4	4	4	4	4	6	6	6	6	10	10	10	10	12		
Archery (recurve)	WArch													2							4					
Basketball 3x3	FIBA																							2	2	
Wheelchair basketball 3x3	IWBF																							2	2	
Mountain biking	UCI																		2	2		2	2	2		
Track cycling	UCI			3	3	4	5	4	4	4	5	6	6	5	5	8	9	9	11	12	14	13	16	16	18	
Track cycling (para)	UCI																					4	4	4	8	
Rhythmic gymnastics	WG																6	6		6	6	6	6	6		
Full Bore	ICFRA									1		1	1	2	2	2	2	2	2	2	2	2	2			
Clay Target	ISSF											2	2	4	4	4	4	5	12	12	8	6	6			
Pistol	ISSF									3		2	2	8	8	8	12	12	14	14	14	5	5			
Small Bore	ISSF									1		1	1	6	6	8	14	12	12	12	12	6	6			
Table tennis (para)	ITTF								p	p	p	p							1	1	1		2	4		
Triathlon (para)	WT																						2	2		
Beach volleyball	FIVB																						2	2		
Cricket	ICC																	1						1		X
Local demand sports
Synchronized swimming	WAqua														2	3	2	2	2	2	2					
Water Polo	WAqua					1																				
Archery (compound)	WArch																				4					
Basketball	FIBA																			2			2			
Greco-Roman wrestling	UWW																				7					
Fencing	FIE					6	6	6	6	7	7															
Rowing	WRowing		5		4	5	5	6	6						15											
Tennis	ITF																				5					
Ten-pin bowling	IBF																	5								
Total events		9	59	68	72	87	90	93	103	109	120	121	128	143	148	216	221	217	280	247	283	261	275	283	215	???

=== Demonstrations sports ===
Commonwealth Games programs have also contained a number of demonstration sports, also variously called exhibition sports. The following sports or disciplines have been demonstrated at the Commonwealth Games for the years shown, but have never been included in the main program.

- Polo (1958)
- Show jumping (1958)
- Lacrosse (1978)
- Australian rules football (1982)
- Sepak takraw (1998)
- Silambam (1998)
- Silat (1998)
- Wushu (1998)

In 2014 and 2018, rugby league nines competitions were held preceding the games. These were endorsed by the CGF but were not listed as official demonstration sports.

== Changes from 2030 ==
In October 2021, the CGF announced a new games roadmap that will, starting with the 2030 Commonwealth Games, change the requirements for sports competed at the Games. The roadmap suggests that between 15 and 17 sports should be competed at each edition. There will be a new category of "Compulsory Sports", containing just athletics and swimming, as well as their para-sport counterparts. The category of "Core Sports" will cease to exist, and all other sports will have the same status; however, each host will have complete freedom to choose the program for their edition from a previously assembled list, as long as the maximum number of 17 sports is not exceeded. If necessary, the hosts could suggest the addition of other sports that respect local demands.

== See also ==
- Asian Games sports
- Olympic sports
- World Games sports
