= England at the Commonwealth Games =

- CG code: ENG
- CGA: Commonwealth Games England
- Website: teamengland.org
- Medals Ranked 2nd: Gold 776 Silver 781 Bronze 765 Total 2,322

Commonwealth Games appearances (overview)
- 1930; 1934; 1938; 1950; 1954; 1958; 1962; 1966; 1970; 1974; 1978; 1982; 1986; 1990; 1994; 1998; 2002; 2006; 2010; 2014; 2018; 2022; 2026; 2030

England is one of only six teams to have competed in every Commonwealth Games since the first Empire Games in 1930. The others are Australia, Canada, New Zealand, Scotland and Wales.

The Commonwealth Games is the only major multi-sport event in which English athletes and teams compete as England, organised by Commonwealth Games England; at Olympic, Paralympic and European Games England participates as part of Great Britain and Northern Ireland, (along with Scotland, Wales and Northern Ireland, 10 of the 13 British Overseas Territories and the three Crown Dependencies) through the British Olympic Association.

== Games summary ==
=== Commonwealth Games ===
Host country (England)

Games	Athletes	Gold	Silver	Bronze	Total	Rank
(Canada) 1930 Hamilton	92	25	22	13	60	1
(England) 1934 London	134	29	20	24	73	1
(Australia) 1938 Sydney	70	15	15	10	40	2
(New Zealand) 1950 Auckland	72	19	16	13	48	2
(Canada) 1954 Vancouver	112	23	24	20	67	1
(Wales) 1958 Cardiff	202	29	22	29	80	1
(Australia) 1962 Perth	143	29	22	27	78	2
(Jamaica) 1966 Kingston	161	33	24	23	80	1
(Scotland) 1970 Edinburgh	196	27	25	32	84	2
(New Zealand) 1974 Christchurch	154	28	31	21	80	2
(Canada) 1978 Edmonton	191	27	28	32	87	2
(Australia) 1982 Brisbane	191	38	38	32	108	2
(Scotland) 1986 Edinburgh	282	52	43	49	144	1
(New Zealand) 1990 Auckland	264	47	40	42	129	2
(Canada) 1994 Victoria	259	31	45	49	125	3
(Malaysia) 1998 Kuala Lumpur	348	36	47	53	136	2
(England) 2002 Manchester	444	54	50	60	164	2
(Australia) 2006 Melbourne	348	36	40	35	111	2
(India) 2010 New Delhi	364	37	60	45	142	3
(Scotland) 2014 Glasgow	416	58	59	57	174	1
(Australia) 2018 Gold Coast	394	45	45	46	136	2
(England) 2022 Birmingham	438	58	65	53	176	2
Total		776	781	765	2322	2

After the 2022 Commonwealth Games, England was second in the All-time tally of medals, with an overall total of 2322 medals (776 Gold, 781 Silver and 765 Bronze). Australia has been the highest scoring team for fourteen games, England for seven and Canada for one.

=== Commonwealth Paraplegic Games ===
Games	Athletes	Gold	Silver	Bronze	Total	Rank
(Australia) 1962 Perth	31	30	41	19	90	2
(Jamaica) 1966 Kingston	–	64	50	30	144	1
(Scotland) 1970 Edinburgh	–	48	32	23	103	1
(New Zealand) 1974 Dunedin	53	44	33	24	101	2
Total		186	156	96	438	1

== Host nation ==
England has hosted the Games thrice:

1934 British Empire Games – London, England
2002 Commonwealth Games – Manchester, England
2022 Commonwealth Games – Birmingham, England

== Commonwealth Games England ==
Commonwealth Games England (CGE) is the organisation responsible for all matters relating to the Commonwealth Games in England. Membership of the Games Council consists of representatives of 26 sports in the Commonwealth Games programme from which the host city selects up to 17 sports for each Games. The officers are elected by the council and hold office for 4 years, their work will be supported by four salaried staff. The current president is Dame Kelly Holmes, who won her first international Gold medal at the 1994 Commonwealth Games, in Victoria, Canada.

CGE is a member of the Commonwealth Games Federation who have overall responsibility for the direction and control of the Commonwealth Games.

=== How it helps English competitors ===
Since 1994, the costs of the preparation of Team England have been supported with funding from Sport England, a public body that distributes public and lottery funds. This has enabled CGE to run extensive management, training and educational programmes, ensuring that competitors and officials alike are fully prepared to meet the challenges ahead.

=== Funds ===
The raising of funds for the team's participation in the Games themselves is the sole responsibility of CGE and is raised through sponsorship and fund-raising activities. Donations from commerce and industry as well as the general public towards the team's costs are almost always received well by the public. These donations help support the integrity of the games.

=== Brand identity ===
In the run-up to the 2010 Commonwealth Games, CGE adopted a new logo and brand identity. The new logo features a single red English lion which represents strength, power and performance. The team strapline is "We are England".

=== Flag and victory anthem ===
Team England uses the Cross of St George as its flag at the Commonwealth Games. This flag is common for all sporting teams that represent England as an entity distinct from the United Kingdom.

Since 2010 onwards, Team England have used the hymn "Jerusalem" as their victory anthem. This replaced "Land of Hope and Glory" which was used at previous games. In April 2010, Commonwealth Games England conducted a poll of members of the public which would decide the anthem for the 2010 Games. The three options were "God Save The Queen", "Jerusalem" and "Land of Hope and Glory" with "Jerusalem" being the clear winner securing 52% of the vote.
