= Victor Salvemini =

Australian Paralympic athlete (1946–2020)

Personal information
- Nationality: Australian
- Born: 15 August 1946
- Died: 15 January 2020 (aged 73) Murdoch, Western Australia
Medal record
Archery
Commonwealth Paraplegic Games
Silver medal – second place	1970 Edinburgh
Bronze medal – third place	1974 Dunedin

Victor Salvemini (15 August 1946 – 15 January 2020) was an Australian Paralympic athlete from Western Australia. As a wheelchair athlete, he competed in several sports including archery, basketball and track sprinting in the 1970s. A paraplegic, he lost the use of both his legs after a car accident in Fremantle, Western Australia in 1961 when he was 14 years old.

== Early life and athletic career ==
Salvemini was the son of Italian migrants to Western Australia. He was introduced to wheelchair sport at the Royal Perth Rehabilitation Hospital in Shenton Park following his accident.

== Paralympic Games ==
Salvemini competed in two Paralympic Games. At the 1972 Summer Paralympics in Heidelberg, Germany he competed in archery, athletics and wheelchair basketball. In the 100 metres Para-Athletics (Wheelchair 3) event, he placed 13th. In archery, he finished 13th in the Men's Short Western Round Open and eighth in the Men's Short Western Round Team Open. The wheelchair basketball team finished eighth. He had been selected for the 1972 Heidelberg Games following his participation in the 1972 National Paraplegic and Quadriplegic Games in Sydney in archery (Short Western round) and athletics (100m Class 3 and 800m Open events).

At the 1976 Summer Paralympics in Toronto, he competed in wheelchair basketball as a forward. The team finished tenth out of 21 teams.

== Commonwealth Paraplegic Games ==
Salvemini competed and medalled in two Commonwealth Paraplegic Games. At the 1970 Edinburgh Games, he won silver in archery. At the 1974 Dunedin Games, he won bronze in archery.

== FESPIC Games ==
Salvemini competed at the 1977 Far East and South Pacific Games for the Disabled (FESPIC Games) in Sydney in wheelchair basketball.

== National Archery Championships ==
Salvemini competed in several events in the National Archery Championships held in Perth in 1973.

== Personal life ==
Salvemini trained as a wood turner and ran his own wood-turning business. He was a wooden model boat builder, has volunteered at Fremantle Hospital, and was a distributor for the Fremantle Gazette newspaper.

In October 1974 Salvemini married Jaquie Lloyd.

He has participated in seven international work skills competitions – the Abilympics: Japan 1981; Hong Kong 1991; Perth 1995; Prague 2000; Japan 2007 (flag bearer at opening ceremonies); Seoul 2011. He died on 15 January 2020, aged 73.

== Recognition ==
Salvemini was awarded a commendation in the Accessible Communities Awards for 2003 for outstanding contribution towards increasing community awareness and understanding of the needs of people with disabilities, organised jointly in Western Australian by the Disability Services Commission, the advocacy organisation People With DisAbilities WA Inc., and the Office of Seniors’ Interests and Volunteering.
