= Cherrie Ireland =

Australian former wheelchair athlete

Personal information
- Full name: Cheryl Ann Ireland
- Nationality: Australia
- Born: Cheryl Ann Loydstrom

Cheryl Ann "Cherrie" Dallas-Smith (née Loydstrom, formerly Ireland), MBE is an Australian former wheelchair athlete, swimmer and table tennis player who represented her country at two Paralympic Games and two Commonwealth Paraplegic Games in the 1960s and 1970s. Born in Darwin, She was on holiday in Melbourne when she was paralysed by polio at the age of five. Her family moved to Brisbane and she became involved in competitive sport through the Queensland Sports and Social Club for the Disabled.

She became Queensland’s first female Paralympian when she was selected to compete for Australia at the 1968 Tel Aviv Paralympics. She later recalled: "It’s hard to put into words the feeling of pride, excitement and exhilaration at being selected for the team to represent Australia...It was a truly wonderful experience." She participated in athletics, swimming and table tennis events, but did not medal.

At the 1970 Commonwealth Paraplegic Games in Edinburgh, Cherrie won 11 medals, including five gold medals in discus, shot put, wheelchair slalom and swimming (50 m freestyle and 3×50 m individual medley). She was awarded an MBE for her success at the games in 1971. She participated in athletics and swimming events at the 1972 Heidelberg Paralympics. She and husband Maurie were both selected to represent Australia at the 1974 Commonwealth Paraplegic Games in Dunedin. She broke her Commonwealth 50 m freestyle record and won four silver medals and a bronze medal.
