= Charlene Todman =

Australian athlete (1931–2018)

Charlene Meade
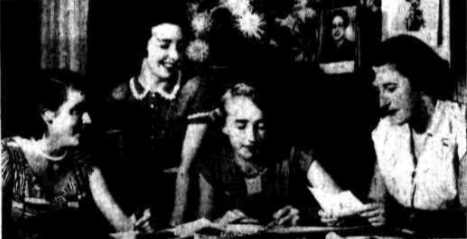
- Todman, left, with other members of the N.S.W. Society for Crippled Children in 1953.

Personal information
- Nickname: Charlene Todman
- Born: 1931 Sydney, Australia
- Died: 11 September 2018 (aged 86–87) Sydney, Australia
Medal record
Women's archery
Stoke Mandeville Games
Silver medal – second place	1951	Women's individual
Women's table tennis
Stoke Mandeville Games
Silver medal – second place	1974	Women's individual

Charlene Stuart Meade (née Todman; 1931 – 11 September 2018) was an Australian athlete who became the first Australian woman to participate in the Stoke Mandeville Games, the precursor to the Paralympic Games. She finished second amongst women in the archery event, and later competed in the 1959 edition in para-swimming, archery and javelin. At the 1974 games, she won a silver medal in table tennis. Todman later became active in dog sports.

Todman had to use a wheelchair following an accident with a horse when she was fourteen years old. She rehabilitated at the Stoke Mandeville Hospital, and later volunteered with the New South Wales Society for Crippled Children. In 2008, she was awarded the Medal of the Order of Australia for her efforts in serving Australia's disability community.

== General ==
Todman was born in 1931 in Sydney. Her father was industrialist Charles Ingram Todman (1882-1958), who served as an alderman in Strathfield, and her grandfather was tobacco merchant George Todman (1849-1924). Her mother was Phyllis Stuart Pearce (died 1986). Her family was well known for their sporting efforts.

In 1946, when she was 14 and living in Double Bay, she was working with her mother at the Tor Lodge in Bowral during her school holidays when she was thrown from a horse while racing a friend from school. From the local district hospital, Bowral Hospital, she was transported to Lewisham Hospital in Sydney after her parents consulted with friends about the best course of treatment. The accident resulted in her spine being fractured at the T5 level; she was paralyzed from the waist down. The hospital had no specialized spinal care treatment center and was run by nuns. Her first wheelchair was a wooden cane chair with wheels, and her rehabilitation options were few. After a few months in hospital, Todman returned home. Ascham School, which she attended in 1942 and 1943, was not wheelchair accessible. As a consequence, she changed schools and finished her education at Correspondence School in William Street, East Sydney.

Travelling with her mother and a nurse, in August 1950 she went to Stoke Mandeville Hospital in England aboard the Orcades to rehabilitate for fifteen months under the care of Ludwig Guttmann. She turned 19 shortly after she arrived in the United Kingdom. Initially, she was to have gone to the Wingfield-Morris Orthopaedic Centre in Oxfordshire after her father met Lord Nuffield, who invited her there. Her x-rays were lost en route and the hospital determined her condition was not suited to the treatment they offered. She returned to Australia in 1951, arriving in Melbourne on 5 December aboard the Orion. She returned to live in Double Bay. She had acquired a collapsible wheelchair, a Dingwall, in England, and took courses on typing. These skills and tools made her more independent. Todman soon found work at the Blood Bank in York Street.

== Sports ==
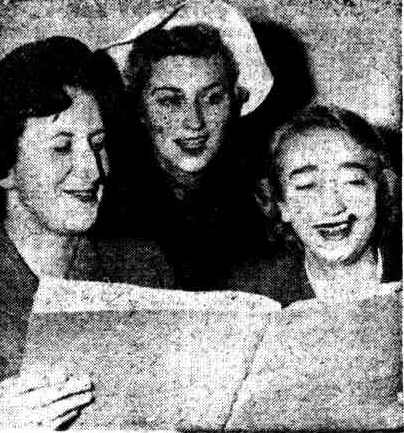
Charlene Todman, Bunty Brooks and Pat Kingsford at a NSW Society for Crippled Children event in May 1953.

Todman was the first Australian to compete in the Stoke Mandeville Games, competing in archery at the 1951 edition as a member of the Stoke Mandeville team while rehabilitating at the Stoke Mandeville Hospital. She was one of the first known women international competitors at the event. She finished second among women in her event, four points behind teammate Rose Heath.

Back in Australia, she demonstrated archery to patients at the Royal North Shore Hospital in Sydney. In December 1951, she was part of efforts to form an Australian team to compete against a visiting English wheelchair archery team. Prior to her departure from Stoke Mandeville, Ludwig Guttmann had promised her that he would send an English team to Australia to beat the Australians in archery.

She later competed in javelin and swimming in addition to archery. In this period, she also played for a Sydney-based wheelchair basketball team. By early 1960, she was trying to qualify for the first Paralympic Games in Rome but the birth of her daughter interfered with some of her sporting goals.

She continued to be involved with sports in the 1960s and 1970s as part of her continuing rehabilitation efforts. She competed at the 1966 National Paraplegic and Quadriplegic Games in Melbourne in archery, swimming and table tennis. Meade was one of five women making up the New South Wales team, with all seeking qualification for the 1966 Commonwealth Paraplegic Games. While raising her two children, she was swimming competitively in 1968. At the 1970 edition of the Stoke Mandeville Games, she won 7 medals. She also competed at the Royal North Shore Hospital Paraplegic Games.

Competing at the 1972 National Paraplegic and Quad Games in Holroyd, she participated in the final of the women's 4 x 60 m relay for the New South Wales team along with J. Stokes, C. Kirby and G. Milburn; they posted a time of 1:34.1 to finish third. Todman also finished fourth in the women's class 2 javelin event, behind Elaine Schreiber, Elizabeth Richards and M. Lester, who all set world records on their way to the podium. In the pool, she finished first in the women's 25 m freestyle front class 2 event with a time of 31.8, ahead of third-place finisher Richards, who posted a time of 38.5, and behind Pam Foley who set a world and Australian record time of 28.0. In the Women's 50 m Individual Medley Class 2, Todman finished second with a time of 2:10.8 behind record-setter Foley, who posted a time of 1:56.0. Foley set another Australian record in the Women's 25 m Breaststroke Class 2 with a time of 33.2 seconds to leave Todman in third place with a time of 43.2 seconds. She also placed third in the women's 25 m freestyle back class 2 event with a time of 40.7 seconds.

Todman traveled back to England for the 1974 Stoke Mandeville Games in Aylesbury Vale, where she won a silver medal in table tennis. In the 1975 National Paraplegic and Quadriplegic Games she competed in women's discus, precision javelin and distance javelin. Todman continued to be involved with sports on a national level in Australia until her physical condition deteriorated significantly. Over her competitive career she won 26 medals on the local, national and international levels.

At the suggestion of a friend's daughter who was also a wheelchair user, Todman later became involved with dog sports. She earned the Utility Dog level in obedience trials. After she became stranded at Centennial Park when her wheelchair became stuck, she was rescued by her 11-year-old companion dog, Brook, a Shetland sheepdog; the Governor-General, Sir Peter Cosgrove, presented her with the 2016 Canine Hero Award for Brook at the Sydney Royal Easter Show.

== Later life ==
In November 1955 Todman married Eric Meade, a polio survivor whom she met at the Spastic Centre in Mosman. Despite advice from Guttmann that pregnancy would lead to kidney damage, she had two children. While her daughter Angela was delivered via cesarean, she gave birth vaginally to her son Stuart, the first Australian paraplegic woman known to have done so. Following the birth of her children, she got her first pet dog since before her accident. Her husband died in 1996.

Todman was a member of the N.S.W. Society for Crippled Children, where she served as a committee member in 1953 and 1954. She was a board member of the Royal Rehabilitation Centre Sydney from 1986 to 2007. In this period, she served on various committees including the Clinical Care Review Committee and the Extended Care Planning Committee. She was a member of the Woollahra Council Access Committee, and also volunteered with the Australian Red Cross. In 2008 she was awarded the Order of Australia Medal for her volunteer services.
