= Ray Barrett (athlete) =

Australian Paralympic athlete

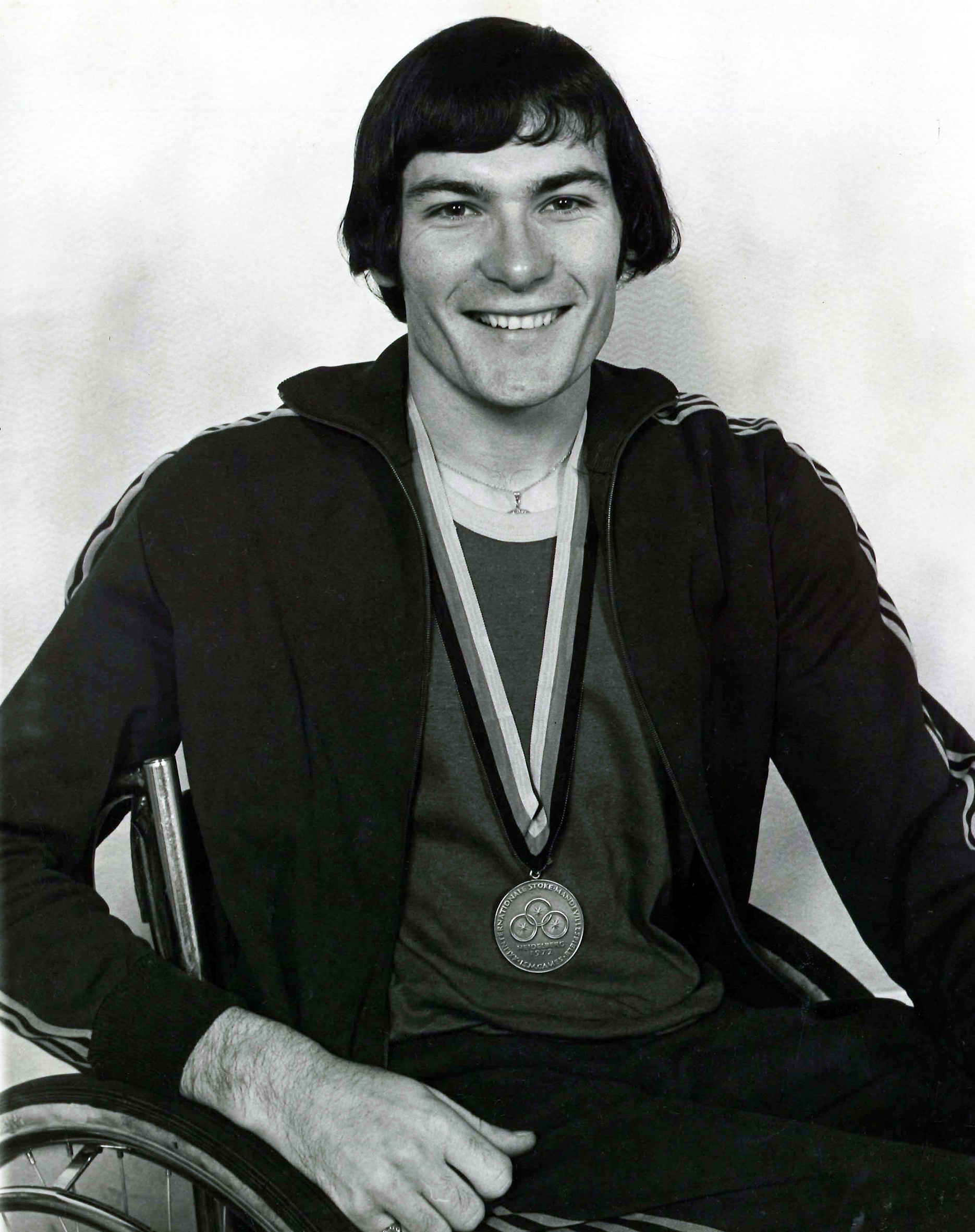

Personal information
- Full name: Raymond Barrett
- Nationality: Australia
- Born: 1952 New South Wales
- Died: August 2000 (aged 47–48) Queensland, Australia
Medal record
Men's para athletics
Representing Australia
Paralympic Games
Bronze medal – third place	1972 Heidelberg	100 m Wheelchair 2

Raymond Barrett (1952 – August 2000) was an Indigenous Australian Paralympic athlete left a paraplegic following a car accident. Prior to this he was a champion juvenile athlete in able-bodied sports. A bronze medalist at the 1972 Summer Paralympics Heidelberg Germany, a high achiever at the Stoke Mandeville Games England, Commonwealth Paraplegic Games, National Paraplegic and Quadriplegic Games, FESPIC Games and State selection trials. A sporting complex in the Sutherland Shire of Sydney is named in his honor. The people of this Shire were his 'significant others'.

== Personal ==
Raymond Barrett was born in 1952. He attended the Woolloomooloo Day Nursery during his pre-school years. His mother Barbara Evans, grandfather Charles Merritt and great grandmother Emily Wedge were indigenous Australians of the Wiradjuri people, Aboriginal farming families at Blakney and Pudman Creeks, New South Wales.

In 1965, while riding his bicycle home from Heathcote High School in New South Wales (NSW), he was accidentally hit by a car and became a paraplegic wheelchair user at 13 years of age. After spending twelve months in hospital he returned home to be cared for by his mother, Barbara, and stepfather Robert (Bob) Evans. Prior to the accident he was a champion archer, and a member of the Sutherland Shire Athletic Club. He broke records that held for nine years in shot put and discus as well as long-distance running and sprints. Following his discharge from hospital, he joined the Paraplegic Association of NSW. Due to problems with the steps at primary school, Barrett completed his high school education at Lakemba School for the Handicapped in the suburbs of Sydney. Later he trained to be a printer under a scheme conducted by the New South Wales Disabled Workers' Organisation.

The New South Wales Association for training the Disabled in Office Work (NADOW), awarded Barrett the honour of "Trainee of the Year". He was one of the first NADOW trainees to operate an Offset Printing Press from a wheelchair during his rehabilitation in the spinal unit of Royal North Shore Hospital Sydney.

Barrett, an electrical technician at the poker machine company Nut and Muddle, Darlinghurst a suburb of Sydney, worked Monday to Friday for eight years and in the evenings he concentrated on his athletic training.

The sporting complex at Port Hacking High School, Miranda, a suburb of Sydney, is named 'The Ray Barrett Field' in recognition of Barrett's sportmanship. Built on an area of the school campus that was originally a wasteland, 200,000 cubic metres of fill, taken from local excavations, was used to fill the site. Plans added in 1974, included a 6-metre running track around the perimeter of the complex. At the tree-planting ceremony in 1977, pupils planted 60 trees around the perimeter of The Ray Barrett Field that was made available for all community sports.

Barret, along with fellow Indigenous Australian Tracy Barrell OAM, was honoured in the 100 years centenary celebration book of the Sutherland Shire 1906-2006

== Career ==
Barrett's noted official duties in his sporting career included: An official of the Sutherland Athletic Club and timekeeper for the New South Wales Athletic Association, timekeeper at the 'able bodied' National Games Melbourne Australia, appointed an official for the British Commonwealth Games Selection Trials in October 1973.

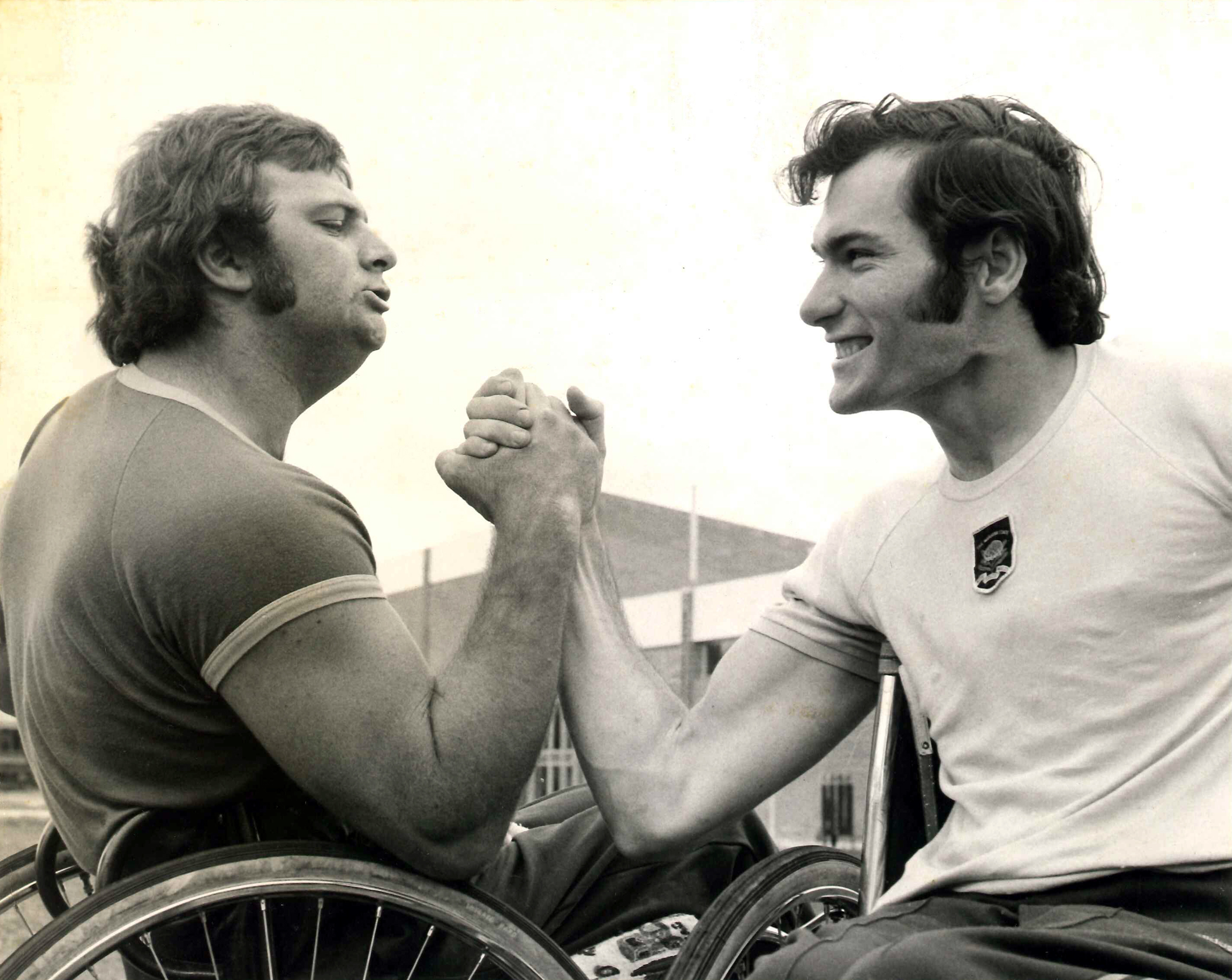
Ray Barrett (right) poses with fellow New South Wales Paralympian Terry Giddy.

Athletes competing at the 1972 Summer Paralympics Heidelberg, Germany required financial assistance of $1800 to be eligible to attend the Games. Barrett contacted the International Lions Club of Engadine, New South Wales, Australia, who held a fundraising event at the local Returned Servicemens League (RSL) Club and raised $1000 towards the targeted cost. Realizing that additional finance was needed, the club appealed to the Sutherland Shire Council and all local organisations and interested people in the Sutherland Shire, a Local Government area of Sydney, to support The Raymond Barrett Olympic Fund.

Barrett also wrote to fifty companies seeking sponsorship but without success. He contacted Jack Griffiths, the Promotion Manager of Westfield Shopping Town, Miranda Fair, Miranda, a suburb of Sydney, who held a competition in which the retail industry of the shopping centre provided the prize. Barrett sold raffle tickets throughout the competition and presented the prize of a gold Seiko watch. The generosity of this community in assisting Barrett with funds needed, was recognised at a community event in which the Governor General of Australia attended.

Major athletic events of Barrett's sporting career:

- 1970 At the National Paraplegic & Quadriplegic Games, Melbourne, he won 9 gold medals in various sports, and was selected athletics 'time keeper' for the able-bodied National Games, Melbourne. At 18 years of age he competed at the Third Commonwealth Paraplegic Games, Edinburgh, Scotland, winning 2 Silver medals in Wheelchair Dash and 1 Bronze medal in Wheelchair Basketball. Barrett's outstanding success at the National Games earned him selection for the Commonwealth Games. From the twenty-member team selected, Barrett was the only athlete from the Sutherland Shire selected to compete at the Games.
- 1972 At the 14th Annual Paraplegic and Quadriplegic Games, 8–14 April, class 2 events, 1st Shot Put; 1st Wheelchair dash; 1st Slalom. 1972 Summer Paralympics, Heidelberg Germany, 1 Bronze medal, 100 metre Wheelchair Dash; 5th Slalom.
- 1973 Athletics Paraplegic and Quadriplegic Games, Adelaide, South Australia, Class 2, 1st Precision Javelin defeated Frank Ponta by 4 points; 2nd Shot Put; 3rd Discus. At the National Paraplegic & Quadriplegic Games, Holroyd, New South Wales, 18–24 March, 2nd place Silver medal world record, 100 metre sprint, he defeated Frank Ponta. Gold medal world record 4 x 100 metre men's relay, Silver medal fencing. At his first competitive event in Rifle Shooting, from a field of 21 competitors he finished 10th, well ahead of Libby Kosmala née L. Richards. Discuss 6th place, Shot Put Bronze medal and Frank Ponta Silver medal. Slalom Gold medal. Historical reports noted that new world records in Class 2 of the 100 metre Wheelchair Sprint were broken.
- 1974 Fourth Commonwealth Paraplegic Games, Dunedin, New Zealand, Barrett won gold, silver and bronze medals and set world records on all three occasions in the Wheelchair Dash, 1 Bronze medal in Wheelchair Basketball.
- 1974 International Stoke Mandeville Games, England. 1 Gold Wheelchair Sprint, 1 Bronze Wheelchair Basketball, 1 Bronze Slalom racing.

Barrett competed in other games while travelling through Europe after the Stoke Mandeville Games of 1974, winning a gold medal in Disabled Sports Competition in Holland. Both he and his friend Paralympian Hugh Patterson, who travelled with him, were invited to coach wheelchair basketball in Basle, Switzerland.

Following his return home from Europe, both he and Hugh Patterson were involved in a car accident. Barrett was left an incomplete quadriplegic with brain stem damage and after two years in hospital, returned to his home in Heathcote, NSW. Later he moved to the Gold Coast, Queensland, Australia, where he lived in the care of his parents. He died in August 2000, having lived thirty-five years after his first accident.
