= Terry Mason =

Australian Paralympic athlete and weightlifter

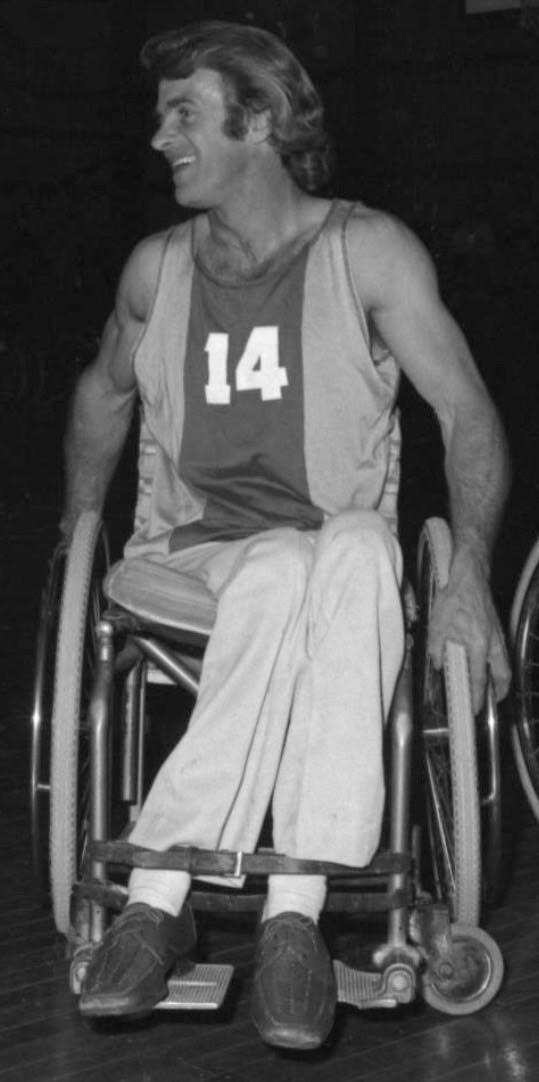
- Mason c. 1976

Personal information
- Nationality: Australian
- Born: 29 March 1943 (age 83)
Medal record
Representing Australia
Paralympic Games
Men's athletics
Bronze medal – third place	1972 Heidelberg	Pentathlon 3
Men's weightlifting
Bronze medal – third place	1976 Toronto	Light-featherweight

Terry Mason (born 29 March 1943) is an Australian Paralympic athlete and weightlifter, who won two bronze medals at two Paralympics.

== Biography ==
Mason grew up in the New South Wales town of Lithgow, and participated in several sports in the local area as a child and young adult, such as football, field hockey, swimming, athletics and wrestling. At the age of 26, he was injured in an accident resulting in him being in a wheelchair. After the accident, Jack Wilkinson encouraged him to become involved in wheelchair sports to maintain his physical fitness.

Two years after the accident, he was selected for the Australian team for the Commonwealth Paraplegic Games in Edinburgh, but did not attend the event. At the 1972 Heidelberg Games, he competed in athletics and weightlifting, winning a bronze medal in the Men's Pentathlon 3 event. At the 1974 Commonwealth Paraplegic Games in Dunedin, New Zealand, he won gold medals in weightlifting and the men's pentathlon. At the 1976 Toronto Games, he competed in athletics and weightlifting events, winning a bronze medal in the Men's Light-featherweight event.

He coaches and promotes wheelchair basketball in the Taree area. He assisted David Hall, a paralympic wheelchair gold medallist, early in his career. He is included in the list of Lithgow sporting champions.
