= Robert McIntyre (Paralympian) =

Australian Paralympic athlete, wheelchair basketball player and coach

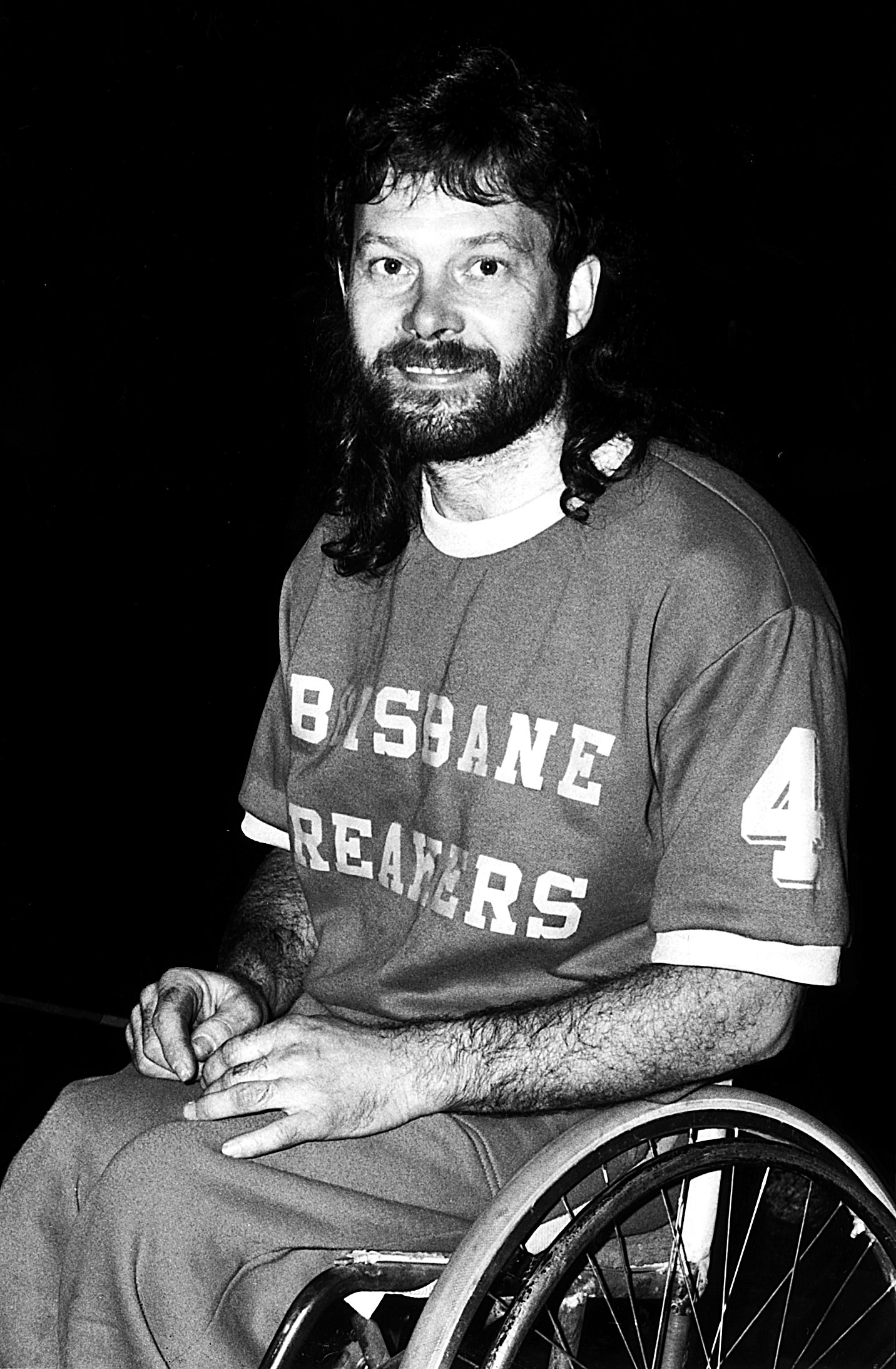
- Robert McIntyre in his trademark Brisbane Breakers No. 4 team shirt

Personal information
- Full name: Robert Lindon McIntyre
- Nickname: Macca
- Nationality: Australia
- Born: 1952/1953
- Died: 23 December 1995 (age 42)

Sport
- Club: Brisbane Breakers
Medal record
Athletics
Paralympic Games
Gold medal – first place	1968 Tel Aviv	Men's Slalom B
Silver medal – second place	1984 New York/Stoke Mandeville	Men's 800 m 5
Bronze medal – third place	1972 Heidelberg	Men's Slalom 5
Bronze medal – third place	1980 Arnhem	Men's Slalom 5
Bronze medal – third place	1984 New York/Stoke Mandeville	Men's 1500 m 5
Bronze medal – third place	1984 New York/Stoke Mandeville	Men's 5000 m 5

Robert Lindon McIntyre (1952/1953 – 23 December 1995) nicknamed "Macca", was an Australian Paralympic athlete, wheelchair basketball player and coach.

== Biography ==
McIntyre was born in Victoria, and was injured in a shooting accident when he was nine years old. His wheelchair basketball career began in 1968 when he represented Victoria at the National Wheelchair Games, where he was voted "best and fairest". He was then selected for the 1968 Tel Aviv Paralympics, where he won a gold medal in the Men's Slalom B event and participated in the Australia men's national wheelchair basketball team; he would go on to win medals at athletics events at every Paralympics until 1984, and participate in Australia's wheelchair basketball squad at every games until 1980. At the 1972 Heidelberg Paralympics, he won a bronze medal in the Men's Slalom 5 event, but did not win any medals at the 1976 Toronto Games. He also represented Australia at the 1970 Edinburgh and 1974 Dunedin Commonwealth Paraplegic Games.

In 1977, he moved to Queensland, and began coaching and playing in the bottom-of-the-ladder Queensland wheelchair basketball team, the Brisbane Breakers. They lost the grand final match of the National Basketball Championships in 1978 by one point, and had back-to-back wins in 1980 and 1981. At the 1980 Arnhem Games, he won a bronze medal in the Men's Slalom 5 event, and coached the national wheelchair basketball team.

At the 1984 New York/Stoke Mandeville Games, he won a silver medal in the Men's 800 m 5 event and two bronze medals in the Men's 1,500 m 5 and Men's 5,000 m 5 events. He also participated in the marathon at the 1984 games; he was part of a bloc of Australian, Canadian, American and new Zealand athletes. The person in front of him, New Zealand's Graham Condon, hit a pothole near the 20-kilometre (12 mi) mark, causing McIntyre to lose his balance and turn upside down in his wheelchair. Condon helped him get back into position, and he ended up finishing equal fourth. During his athletic career, he broke several national records, and held the world record for the 800 m event.

McIntyre was part of the first two Australian teams for the Wheelchair Basketball World Championships in 1983 and 1986. He was involved in wheelchair basketball at a national level until his retirement after the 1993 National Basketball Games on the Gold Coast. In 1995 he was inducted into the Australian Wheelchair Association's Wheelchair Basketball Hall of Fame. He died suddenly on 23 December 1995 at the age of 42. At the time of his death, he was married to Lee.
