= John Martin (Paralympian) =

Australian Paralympic athlete (born 1943)

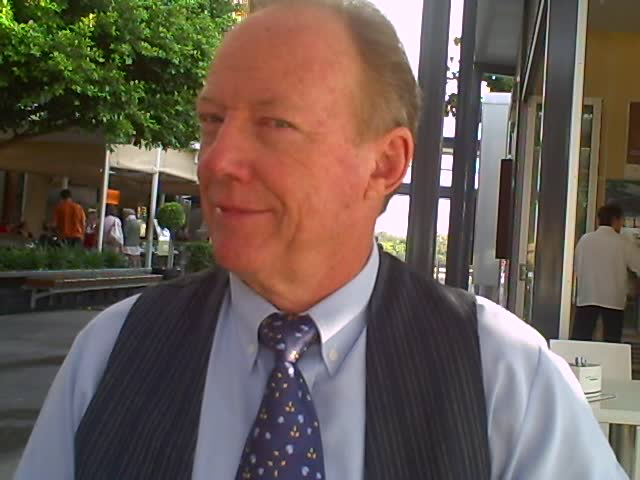
- John Martin in 2010

Personal information
- Nationality: Australia
- Born: 1943 (age 82–83) Eastleigh, England
Medal record
Archery
Paralympic Games
Silver medal – second place	1964 Tokyo	Men's St. Nicholas Round Team open
Athletics
Paralympic Games
Silver medal – second place	1968 Tel Aviv	Men's 4x40 m Relay open
Silver medal – second place	1968 Tel Aviv	Men's Slalom B

John Martin (born 1943) is an Australian Paralympic archer, athlete, table tennis player, wheelchair basketballer and wheelchair fencer who won three silver medals at five Paralympics. He was born in England and emigrated to Australia with his family at the age of 13.

== Personal ==
Martin was born in the English town of Eastleigh in 1943, as the youngest of three children. His father was a carpenter, aircraft mechanic and keen soccer player and his mother was a homemaker. While in England he attended The Crescent Primary School and Toynbee Road Secondary Boys School, where he played soccer and cricket and was a cross-country runner. He moved with his family to Australia in 1956 at the age of 13; they emigrated there due to Martin's sister's rheumatic fever. They moved to the Sydney suburb of Riverstone where he attended Richmond High School. He left school at the age of almost fifteen to work at a timber yard with his father.

In November 1961, aged 18, he contracted polio. He married his first wife, Robyn (née Torrington) in 1967, who was part of a group of people who put on functions to raise money for people with paraplegia; they divorced in 1980. He has three children, two sons and a daughter, and six grandchildren. He worked at 3M from 1973 to 1998, eventually becoming a warehouse manager. In 1998 he moved from Sydney to Brisbane, and he lives in the Brisbane suburb of Birkdale.

== Career ==
Martin began playing wheelchair sport during rehabilitation, and soon excelled at table tennis, defeating the New South Wales champion. At the 1964 Tokyo Paralympics, he won a silver medal in the Men's St. Nicholas Round Team open event. He participated in the 1966 Commonwealth Paraplegic Games in Kingston, Jamaica, where he won three gold, four silver and two bronze medals. At the 1968 Tel Aviv Paralympics, he participated in athletics, table tennis, wheelchair basketball and wheelchair fencing, winning two silver medals in the Men's Slalom B and Men's 4x40 m Relay open events. He won several medals at the 1970 Commonwealth Paraplegic Games in Edinburgh, and equalled the world record in the 100 m at the 1970 Australian National Championships in Melbourne, the qualifying event for the Edinburgh games. At the 1972 Heidelberg Paralympics, he severely cut his hand during a wheelchair basketball game, which virtually ended his campaign; apart from wheelchair basketball, he participated in athletics events at the games, but did not win any medals. He won three gold and two silver medals in the 1974 Commonwealth Paraplegic Games in Dunedin. He went to each Stoke Mandeville Games from 1974 to 1981 and won gold medals in the pentathlon in 1974 and 1975. In 1975, he won five gold and three silver medals at the first FESPIC Games in Japan. That year, he was the first person in a wheelchair to compete in Sydney's City2Surf race; the organisers did not allow him to participate in the previous two events because they did not think he could complete the course.

He equalled the world record in the 1500 m event at the 1976 Australian National Championships, the qualifying event for the 1976 Toronto games. He was the captain–coach of the wheelchair basketball team at the games and also participated in athletics and table tennis events. He was the captain of the Australian team at the 1977 Stoke Mandeville Games where he won a gold medal in the slalom event, a silver medal in lawn bowls and a bronze medal in wheelchair basketball. He also participated in the second FESPIC Games in Sydney in that year. At the 1980 Arnhem Paralympics, he participated in athletics and table tennis events. The 1981 Stoke Mandeville Games was his last international event, but he continued to play wheelchair basketball for the New South Wales team until 1988.
