= Russell Morrison =

Australian Paralympic swimmer

Personal information
- Nationality: Australia
Medal record
Swimming
Paralympic Games
Bronze medal – third place	1972 Heidelberg	Men's 100 m Freestyle 5
Bronze medal – third place	1972 Heidelberg	Men's 3 x 50 m Medley 5

Russell John Morrison (died 4 June 2013 in Adelaide) was a Paralympic swimmer from Australia. He was a classified "5" competitor at the 1972 Heidelberg Paralympics representing Australia in backstroke, freestyle and medley events. He won two bronze medals in the 100 m freestyle and 3 x 50 m medley.

At the 1974 Commonwealth Paraplegic Games in Dunedin, New Zealand he won four gold medals in swimming: Men's 50m Freestyle Front Class 4 (Commonwealth record time), Men's 50m Freestyle Back Class 4 (Commonwealth record time), Men's 3 x 50m Individual Medley Class 4 and Men's 3 x 50m Medley Relay.
