= Pauline English =

Australian Paralympic swimmer

Pauline English OAM
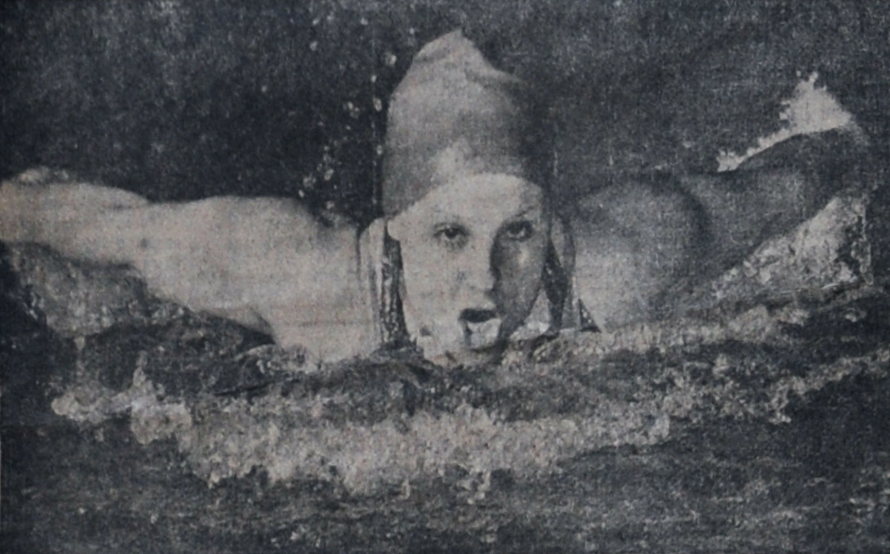

Personal information
- Full name: Pauline Jean English
- Nationality: Australia
Medal record
Swimming
Paralympic Games
Gold medal – first place	1976 Toronto	Women's 25 m Butterfly 4
Bronze medal – third place	1972 Heidelberg	Women's3x25 m Medley 4
Bronze medal – third place	1972 Heidelberg	Women's 50 m Freestyle 4
Bronze medal – third place	1972 Heidelberg	Women's 3x50 m Medley Relay 2–4
Bronze medal – third place	1976 Toronto	Women's 3x50 m Individual Medley 4

Pauline Jean English is an Australian paraplegic swimmer, who won five medals at two Paralympics. She later became the first person with a disability to swim across Sydney Harbour.

English has been paralysed from the waist down since the age of three due to transverse myelitis. In December 1971, shortly after she had finished school at the age of 14, her father encouraged her to take up competitive swimming. He enrolled her at Don Talbot's swimming pool in the Sydney suburb of Hurstville. At that pool, one of Talbot's assistants, Trevor Ellis, taught her how to balance herself and gain power by making her swim against a rubber hose that was tied to both her ankles at the edge of the pool. Four weeks after her first lesson, she broke two Australian records at the New South Wales Paraplegic and Quadriplegic Games and four weeks after that, she won four gold medals and broke four Australian records at the 7th National Paraplegic and Quadriplegic Games, Merrylands. From then on, she was coached by Janice Murphy, who had previously been an Olympic swimmer. English's outstanding achievements at the National Games gained her a place, at 15 years of age, the youngest athlete of the 30-member strong Australian team, to compete at the 1972 Heidelberg Paralympics.

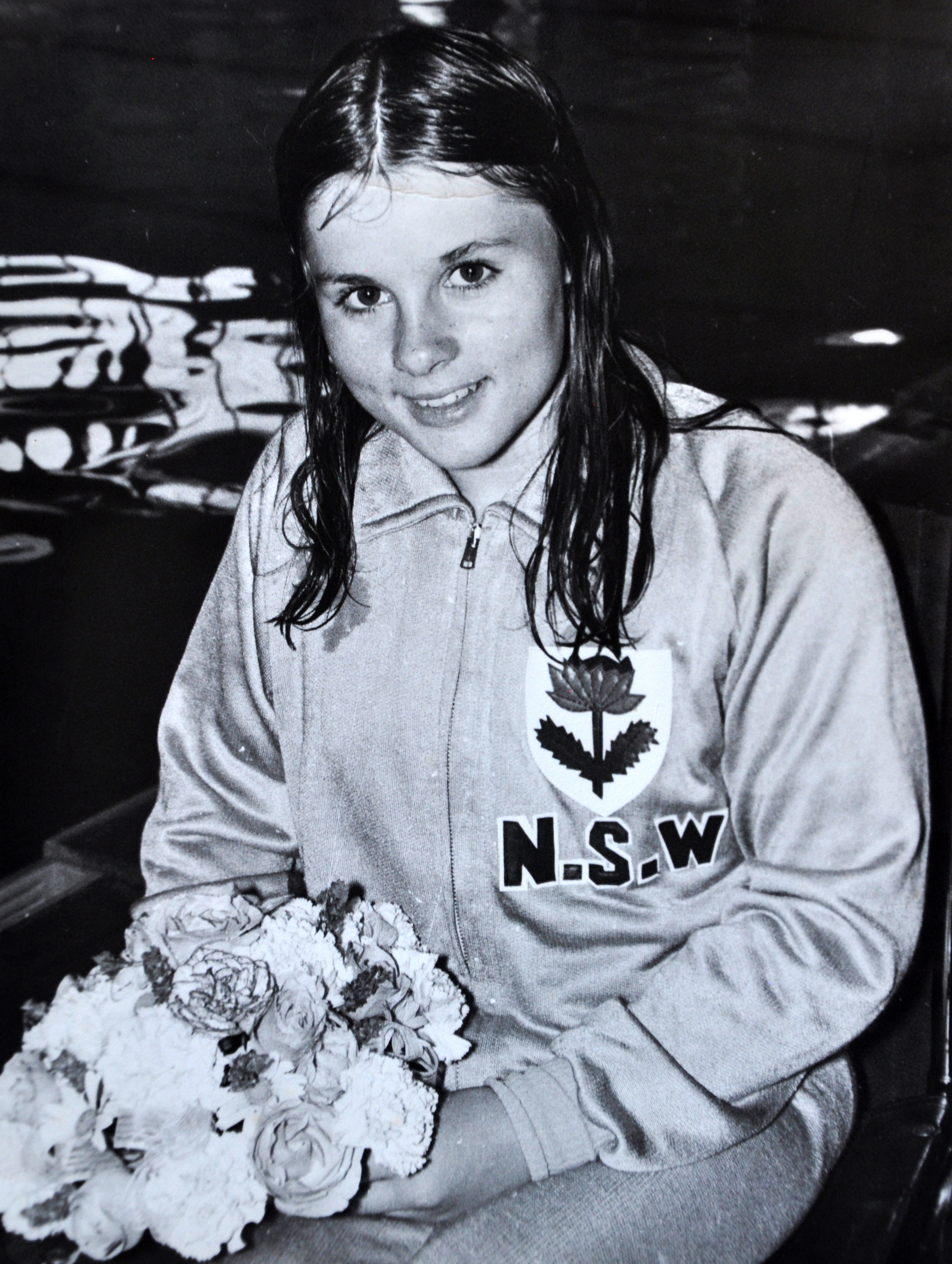
Pauline English was successful in the pool almost immediately

Athletes were required to raise $2000.00 to cover their expenses to attend the Games. Many contributors including the Sunday Mirror, the south coast town of Nowra where English was the guest of honour at the fete, Riverwood and Arncliffe Returned Services League of Australia sub-branches, in total raised $4,460.00, donated to the team as a whole. Children and teachers from Peakhurst South Primary School raised $175.00 from a coin chain across the school playground to further assist English, who then lived in Peakhurst, to compete at the Games. The Mayoress of Hurstville City Council, Mrs K J Ryan also launched an appeal to cover expenses and the Mayor, Alderman K J Ryan MLA, presented the cheque to English.

At the 1972 Games, she won three bronze medals in the Women's 3x25 m Medley 4, Women's 50 m Freestyle 4, and Women's 3x50 m Medley Relay 2–4 events. She won two gold medals in freestyle and individual medley and two silver medals in the backstroke and the relay at the 1974 Commonwealth Paraplegic Games in Dunedin, New Zealand. At the 1974 International Stoke Mandeville Games in London she won a bronze medal. At the 1976 Toronto Paralympics, she won a gold medal in the Women's 25 m Butterfly 4 event and a bronze medal in the Women's 3x50 m Individual Medley 4 event. Her butterfly event was originally scheduled for the evening, so English decided to watch the earlier swimming events at the venue. It was only after she had eaten lunch at the adjoining cafeteria at 1:00pm that she discovered that her butterfly event had been rescheduled to 1:45pm that afternoon. She felt very ill after the race and said in an interview: "I think I must be the only Olympic gold medallist to win on a medal of hamburger, onion rings, honey buns, and chocolate shake".

English won the Leader-McDowell Sportstar award in recognition of her achievements at the 1972 National Games in Merrylands, and, at 19 years of age she won the Stewart-Toyota Leader Sportstar award.

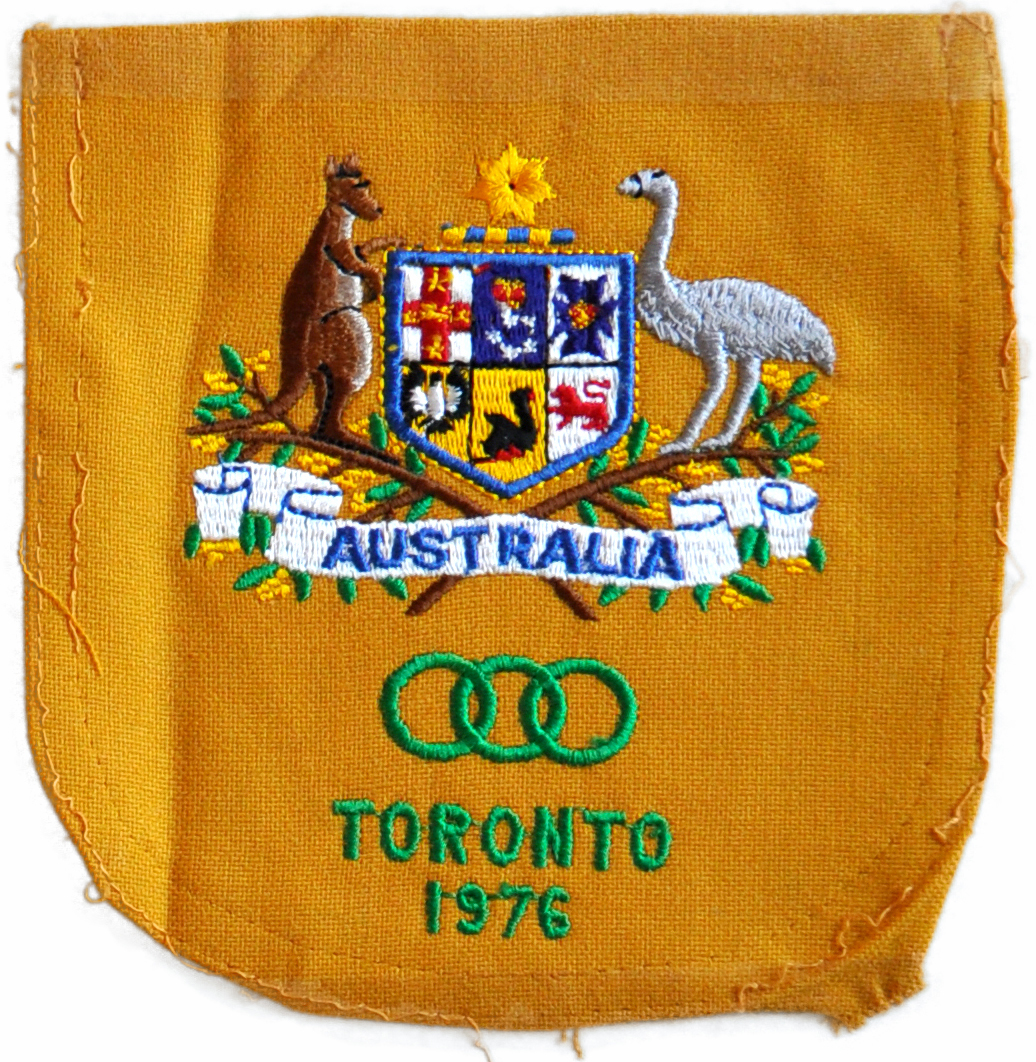

In preparation for the 1976 Toronto Paralympics, English trained with her coach Janice Murphy for the five weeks prior to the Games, at Lakehead University Pool, Thunder Bay, Canada. She home-stayed with the family of Bill Koivisto, who was the organiser of sports for locally disabled people. Bill Guy, sports editor of The Chronicle-Journal, said that the many friends made during her stay would be "pulling for the plucky girl from down under to do well at Toronto".

During her interview with Bill Guy, English said that she was unsure if she would continue competitive swimming after the Games. She had completed her typing and book-keeping course and would make a decision at a later date.

In April 1979, at 22 years of age, she swam more than 2 km across Sydney Harbour from Luna Park to the Man-O-War steps at the Opera House, in 22 minutes without a shark-proof cage, to raise funds for an indoor stadium at Mount Druitt, for both disabled and able-bodied athletes, the construction of which was to begin late in 1979.

Accompanied by long-distance swimmer Des Renford, and escorted by four volunteer professional divers from Sea Life and Dive Company, English quickly outpaced them. She was the first disabled person to swim across Sydney Harbour. Australian spokesperson for the Guinness Book of Records, Bob Burton, said that the swim was a very specialised case and that details sent to London by Des Renford would merit consideration.

Rotary and Rotaract Clubs, together with the United Permanent Building Society who campaigned for funds to provide the stadium, invited English to make the swim to publicize the LP album I Believe. It featured many famous singers who donated their talents, with music by Tommy Tycho. Both English and fellow paralympian Michael North were featured on the cover of the album.

Penshurst Municipal Library, a branch of Hurstville City Council library, approved leave for English to meet her commitments both before and after the marathon swim. This included both radio and television appearances, on the Tonight Show in Melbourne and Guest of Honour on the Channel 7 programme This Is Your Life.

In 1984, she received a Medal of the Order of Australia, "in recognition of service to sport, particularly in relation to people with disabilities".
