= Terry Giddy =

Australian Paralympic athlete (1950–2023)

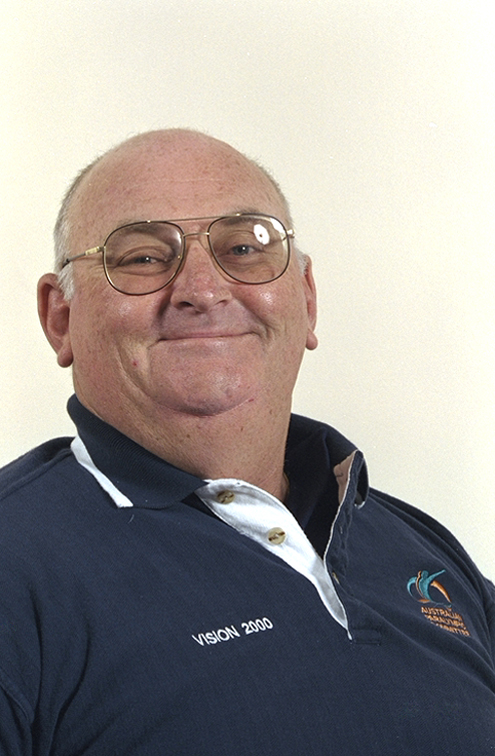
- 2000 Australian Paralympic team portrait of Giddy

Personal information
- Full name: Terence Kenneth Giddy
- Nationality: Australian
- Born: 2 April 1950 Kempsey, New South Wales, Australia
- Died: 18 August 2023 (aged 73) Kempsey, New South Wales, Australia
- Height: 1.80 m (5 ft 11 in)
Medal record
Men's athletics
Representing Australia
Paralympic Games
Gold medal – first place	1984 New York/ Stoke Mandeville	Discus 4
Silver medal – second place	1972 Heidelberg	100 m Wheelchair 4
Silver medal – second place	1988 Seoul	Discus 4
Silver medal – second place	1992 Barcelona	Discus THW6
Bronze medal – third place	1992 Barcelona	Shot Put THW6
Bronze medal – third place	1996 Atlanta	Shot Put F55

Terence Kenneth Giddy (2 April 1950 – 18 August 2023) was an Australian Paralympic athlete with paraplegia, who won six medals over six Paralympics.

== Personal life ==
Terence Kenneth Giddy was born on 2 April 1950 in the New South Wales town of Kempsey, as the second of four children. He became paraplegic at the age of 15 after a tree-felling accident. He was married to Margaret from 1978 until her death in 2022, and had three stepsons and two grandchildren. He ran Big Terry's Little Gym, which trained powerlifters who won world titles. He was 1.8 metres (5 ft 11 in) tall.

Terry Giddy died in Kempsey on 18 August 2023, at the age of 73. In the later part of his life, he lived at Bupa Aged Care Facility in West Kempsey.

== Career ==
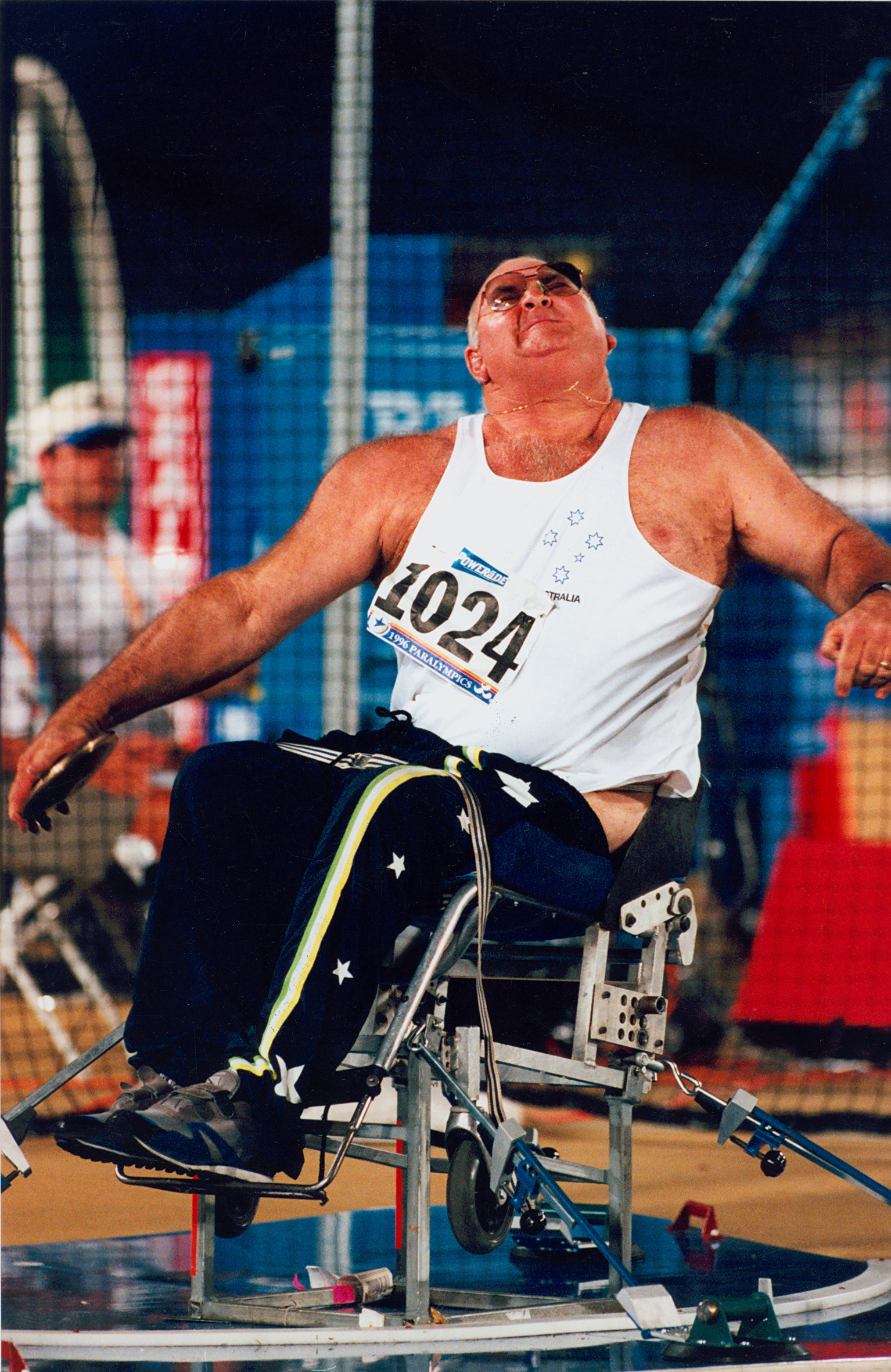
Giddy competing in the F55 seated discus throw event at the 1996 Atlanta Paralympics

Giddy became involved in paralympic sport after a dare. He said "It began at a Christmas party...we were racing up and down the back lane and I said to the boss if I train a bit harder I may get to the Commonwealth Games. My boss and colleagues said if I got picked they would send me away and that's how it started."

Giddy's first national competition was the National Games in 1969, and his first international competition was the 1970 Commonwealth Paraplegic Games in Edinburgh, where he won three gold medals and a silver medal. At the 1972 Heidelberg Paralympics, he won a silver medal in the Men's 100 m Wheelchair 4 event, and also participated in the Australia men's national wheelchair basketball team. He participated in the 1974 Commonwealth Paraplegic Games in Dunedin, New Zealand. He was selected for but did not participate in the 1976 Toronto Paralympics due to illness, and also did not participate in the 1980 Arnhem Paralympics. He won a gold medal at the 1984 New York/Stoke Mandeville Paralympics in the Men's Discus 4 event, a silver medal in the same event at the 1988 Seoul Paralympics, a silver medal in the Men's Discus THW6 event and a bronze medal in the Men's Shot Put THW6 event at the 1992 Barcelona Paralympics, and a bronze medal in the Men's Shot Put F55 event at the 1996 Atlanta Paralympics.

Just before the 2000 Sydney Paralympics, his classification was changed from F56 to F55, and he was told that he had been competing in the wrong disability group for his entire career. He did not win any medals at the 2000 Games. Giddy regretted his disqualification by video footage in the shot put at the Sydney Games after throwing a world record. In 2002, while training in Germany for the world titles in France, he cracked his sternum and hurt his back in a fall. He then prepared for the 2004 Athens Paralympics, but the back injury had flared up again, and the plate in his back had broken in half. He retired in early 2004 due to the injury. He came back for the 2006 Melbourne Commonwealth Games, where he came seventh in the seated shot put, and was Australia's oldest ever Commonwealth Games athlete. At his farewell dinner in 2004, Chris Nunn, Head Coach of the Australian Athletics team at the Sydney Games, said "Whilst you may have travelled thousands of miles in economy class, your contribution has always been first class".

== Recognition ==
In 1988, Giddy received an Advance Australia Award. He carried the flag at the opening ceremony of the 1992 Barcelona Paralympics. In 2000, he received an Australian Sports Medal. That year, he carried the Sydney Olympic torch. He also received an Australia Day award and was given the key to the town of Kempsey. He was one of three Paralympians who campaigned about work safety for WorkCover during and after the 2000 Summer Paralympics. After his death, two members of the New South Wales Legislative Assembly paid tribute to him in state parliament: Michael Kemp, who had been his physiotherapist, and fellow Paralympian Liesl Tesch.
