= Heathcote High School =

- Schola Alta Heathcotensis
- Heathcote, New South Wales; Australia

Information
- School type: Public, comprehensive, coeducational, secondary school
- Motto: Persevere, Strength and Resilience
- Established: 1960
- Principal: Steve Waser
- Teaching staff: 64
- Years offered: 7–12
- Years taught: 7–12
- Enrolment: 813 (2012)
- Campus type: Suburban
- Houses: Bluebell Wattle Banksia Warratah
- Colours: Red & green
- Website: heathcote-h.schools.nsw.gov.au

Heathcote High School, established in 1960, is set in grounds near the Royal National Park on the southern side of Sydney, Australia. It is a Government comprehensive co-educational high school.

== Parliamentary mentions ==
=== Geoff Dodds ===
In a debate in the Parliament of Australia, on 9 October 2006, Danna Vale MP praised several high school principals including Geoff Dodds of Heathcote High saying "I was privileged to be invited to a year 12 graduation assembly and, once again, was stirred by the thoughtful words of the principal’s Geoff Dodds final address to the students."

=== Bravery award ===
A certificate of commendation for bravery was awarded by the New South Wales Parliament to teacher Greg Moon, with the commendation stating as follows:

"Mr Moon was leading an expedition of 10 students along the Dufars river when assistant instructor Gemima Robey slipped and fell into the water at a dangerous bend. With no thought for his own safety, Mr Moon rescued Ms Robey from the river and immediately attempted to resuscitate her. Throughout this, Greg continued to manage the students who were under his care and becoming increasingly distressed."

=== Sporting success ===
In 2007, Year 12 Student Jacob Tito won the Pierre De Coubertin Award in recognition for his bravery in the sporting department. He was a contributor to sports such as swimming, athletics, touch football, Australian rules football and cross-country running (in which he was school champion, in age group, from 2005 to 2007 – Year 10 to Year 12. The Pierre de Coubertin Award is nominated to those high school students across Australia, via the Australian Olympic Committee.

In 2019, Heathcote High School won the University Shield knock out rugby competition. Craig Holmes coached the team to victory, winning the grand final 56–12 against Bass High School.

== Notable alumni ==
- Jason Bargwanna – racing driver, Supercars 1998–2011. Won the 2000 Bathurst 1000 driving with Garth Tander
- Ray Barrett – athlete; Indigenous Australian Paralympian
- Ella Nelson – Olympian, Track athlete. 4 time National 200m champion. Competed at 2016 Olympics, 2015 and 2017 World Championships, 2014 Commonwealth Games
- Marcela Bilek – 'Physical Scientist of the Year' 2002 and Professor of Applied Physics, University of Sydney
- Peter Hadfield – athletes; nine-times Australian champion in athletics, represented Australia at two Olympic Games and two Commonwealth Games and won Silver in 1978 Commonwealth Games Decathlon, then became an athletics commentator for ABC Radio
- Isobel Redmond – politician; Leader of Opposition (Liberal Party) between 2009 and 2014, South Australian Parliament
- Aaron Calver – footballer. Plays as a defender for Gwangju FC in South Korea.
- April Brandley (ńee Letton) – netball player. Defence player for Australian Diamonds and Collingwood in Suncorp Super Netball.
- Ben Dwarshuis – Cricketer. Bowler for the Sydney Sixers. Capped by Australia in T20 format.
- Brandon Loupos – Freestyle BMX Rider. X Games Gold Medal for BMX Dirt in 2018.
- Brendan Gan – Soccer Player is a current player in the National Premier League NSW playing for the Sutherland Sharks as of July 2025 attended 2000–2005
- Robyn Clay-Williams – academic and one of the first two women to serve as pilots in the Royal Australian Air Force (RAAF).

== See also ==
- List of government schools in New South Wales: G–P
- Education in Australia
