= Eric Boulter =

Australian Paralympian (born 1952)

Personal information
- Nationality: Australia
- Born: 15 October 1952 (age 73) Melbourne, Australia
Medal record
Swimming
Paralympic Games
Gold medal – first place	1972 Heidelberg	Men's 25 m Backstroke 2
Silver medal – second place	1972 Heidelberg	Men's 3x25 m Medley 2
Commonwealth Paraplegic Games
Gold medal – first place	1974 Dunedin	Men's 25 m Backstroke
Gold medal – first place	1974 Dunedin	Men's 4x50 m Medley Relay
Silver medal – second place	1974 Dunedin	Men's 25 m Freestyle
Silver medal – second place	1974 Dunedin	Men's 3x25 m Individual Medley
FESPIC Games
Gold medal – first place	1977 Sydney	Men's 25 m Backstroke
Silver medal – second place	1977 Sydney	Men's 25 m Freestyle
Athletics
FESPIC Games
Silver medal – second place	1977 Sydney	Men's Pentathlon

Eric Boulter (born 15 October 1952) is an Australian swimmer, athlete, and wheelchair basketball player who won two medals at the 1972 Heidelberg Paralympics.

== Personal ==
Boulter was born in Melbourne on 15 October 1952. While on a cycling holiday on the Gold Coast in 1969, he had a fall at the Nerang Velodrome which left him paraplegic. Outside of sport, Boulter worked for a speedboat charter business until 1984 before serving his local city council for 22 years. He moved to Rockhampton in 2012.

== Competitive career ==
Boulter temporarily checked out of hospital to represent Queensland in his first National Disabled Championships in 1970. He then returned to the Gold Coast and searched for a coach. He found Dave Tomlinson, who worked with him for the rest of his career. He was the captain of the Australian swimming team at the 1972 Heidelberg Paralympics, where he won a gold medal in the Men's 25 m Backstroke 2 event, in which he broke a world record, and a silver medal in the Men's 3x25 m Medley 2 event; he also came fifth in the Men's 25 m Freestyle 2 – event. He was also the captain of the Australian swimming team at the 1974 Commonwealth Paraplegic Games in Dunedin, New Zealand, where he won two gold medals in the Men's 25 m Backstroke and Men's 4x50 m Medley Relay events, and two silver medals in the Men's 25 m Freestyle and Men's 3x25 m Individual Medley events; he broke a Commonwealth record in the backstroke. At the 1977 FESPIC Games in Sydney, he won a gold medal in the Men's 25 m Backstroke event and two silver medals in the Men's 25 m Freestyle and Men's Pentathlon events. He also played wheelchair basketball, representing Queensland in national championships from 1976 until his retirement from sport in 1984.

== Recognition ==
Boulter was inducted into the Gold Coast Sporting Hall of Fame in 1999.
