= Dennis Kay =

New Zealand cricketer

Personal information
- Full name: Dennis Jon Kay
- Born: 12 April 1948; Palmerston North, New Zealand
- Died: 27 November 2007 (aged 59); Palmerston North, New Zealand
- Batting: Left-handed
- Bowling: Right-arm medium
- Role: Bowler

Domestic team information
- Years: Team
- 1974/75–1977/78: Central Districts

Career statistics
Competition	First-class	List A
Matches	15	2
Runs scored	107	0
Batting average	8.91	–
100s/50s	0/0	0/0
Top score	39 not out	0*
Balls bowled	2,514	96
Wickets	48	2
Bowling average	22.41	25.50
5 wickets in innings	3	0
10 wickets in match	1	0
Best bowling	7/62	1/18
Catches/stumpings	7/–	0/–
- Source: Cricinfo, 3 March 2023

Dennis Jon Kay (12 April 1948 – 27 November 2007) was a New Zealand cricketer. He played in fifteen first-class and two List A matches for Central Districts from 1974 to 1978.

Kay was a right-arm medium-pace bowler. After two first-class matches in 1974–75 and none in 1975–76, Kay had a successful season in 1976-77 when he took 33 wickets at an average of 16.48, including 7 for 62 (match figures of 11 for 138) against Canterbury in the Shell Trophy. He also took 3 for 60 and 4 for 38 in a losing cause against Otago in the final ten days later. After a few unsuccessful matches in 1977–78, he played no further first-class cricket. He also played Hawke Cup cricket for Manawatu from 1967 to 1976.
