= Cliff Rickard =

Australian paralympic athlete (born 1943)

Personal information
- Nationality: Australia
- Born: 1943 (age 82–83)
Medal record
Snooker
Paralympic Games
Bronze medal – third place	1972 Heidelberg	Men's Tetraplegic

Cliff Rickard (born 1943) is an Australian Paralympic athlete, snooker player and table tennis player.

At the 1972 Heidelberg Games, he won a silver medal in the Men's Tetraplegic snooker event and competed in athletics and table tennis.

He has been a member of Wheelchair Sports WA since 1960 and has served on the executive in every capacity except treasurer. In 1990, he was made life member of Wheelchair Sports WA. He was a founding board member of WA Disabled Sports Association. From 1985 to 1990, he was president of the Australian Wheelchair Sports Association. In 2011, he was President of Wheelchair Sports WA's Senior Wheelies Committee. In 2000, he was awarded the Australian Sports Medal.

He is married to Maureen and between them they have two sons and two daughters.
