= Pam Foley =

Australian Paralympic swimmer

Personal information
- Nationality: Australia
Medal record
Swimming
Paralympic Games
Silver medal – second place	1972 Heidelberg	Women's 25 m Freestyle 2
Silver medal – second place	1972 Heidelberg	Women's 3x25 m Medley 2

Pam Nugent (née Foley) is an Australian Paralympic swimmer. She was studying to be a nurse at Mater Hospital in Townsville, when she became paralysed from the waist down at the age of 19 after her new motorbike crashed over Castle Hill. She took up swimming after the accident to strengthen her arms. At the 1972 Heidelberg Paralympics, she won two silver medals in the Women's 25 m Freestyle 2 and Women's 3x25 m Medley 2 events. She married Paralympic athlete and wheelchair manufacturer Mike Nugent in 1975; he died in May 2024.
