= Commonwealth Paraplegic Games =

Defunct international multi-sport event

The Commonwealth Paraplegic Games were an international, multi-sport event involving athletes with a disability from the Commonwealth countries. The event was sometimes referred to as the Paraplegic Empire Games and British Commonwealth Paraplegic Games. Athletes were generally those with spinal injuries or polio. The Games were an important milestone in the Paralympic sports movement as they began the decline of the Stoke Mandeville Games' dominating influence. The event was first held in 1962 and disestablished in 1974. The Games were held in the country hosting the Commonwealth Games for able-bodied athletes, a tradition eventually fully adopted by the larger Olympic and Paralympic movements.

The countries that had hosted the Commonwealth Paraplegic Games were Australia, Jamaica, New Zealand and Scotland. Six countries — Australia, England, New Zealand, Northern Ireland, Scotland and Wales — had been represented at all Commonwealth Paraplegic Games. Australia and England had been the top-ranking nation two times each: 1962, 1974 and 1966, 1970 respectively.

== Founding and establishment ==
The Games were the initiative of George Bedbrook, Director of the Spinal Unit of Royal Perth Hospital. In Australia, paraplegic sports activities were first held in 1954 with the First Royal Perth Hospital Games in 1954 at the Shenton Park Annex. In 1956, Bedbrook was encouraged during a visit by Ludwig Guttmann, the founder of the Stoke Mandeville Games, to help organise disabled sport in Australia. In 1959, the Paraplegic Association of Western Australia, acting through Royal Perth Hospital, began to publicise the Paraplegic Empire Games just prior to the British Empire Games to be held in Perth in 1962.

== Editions of the games ==
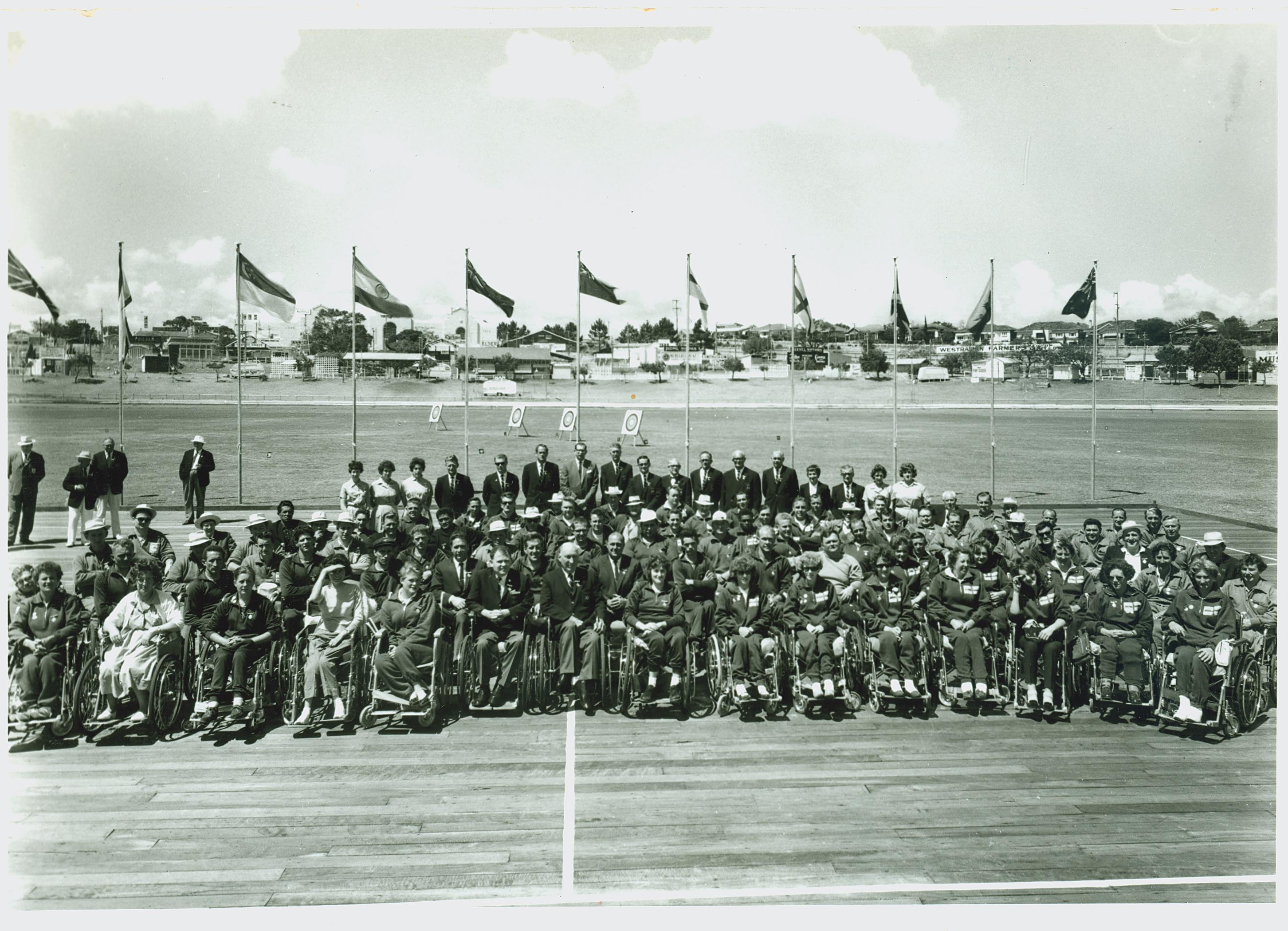
1962 Commonwealth Paraplegic Games Competitors

=== 1st Commonwealth Paraplegic Games ===
The first Commonwealth Paraplegic Games were held in Perth, Australia in 1962. An Organising Committee was established with Hugh Leslie, Executive Chairman, George Bedbrook, General Secretary and Mrs M.R. Fathers, Secretary. The Games were opened by the Governor of Western Australia, Sir Charles Gairdner on 10 November 1962. Two Perth facilities were used: the Royal Agricultural Showground in Claremont for accommodation and most sporting events and the City of Perth Aquatic Centre, Beatty Park for swimming. Medals were awarded in the following sports: archery, dartchery, athletics, swimming, weightlifting, fencing, snooker, table tennis and basketball. Nine countries participated: England, India, New Zealand, Northern Ireland, Rhodesia, Scotland, Singapore, Wales and Australia, and there were 93 athletes. A film of the Games was made. Australia was the leading nation in the medal table, followed by England and Rhodesia.

=== 2nd Commonwealth Paraplegic Games ===
The second Commonwealth Paraplegic Games were held in Kingston, Jamaica in 1966. There were 133 athletes from 10 countries. The countries included Australia, England, Fiji, Jamaica, New Zealand, Northern Ireland, Scotland, Trinidad and Tobago and Wales. England had the largest delegation at the Games. The games were opened by HRH Prince Philip. Sports on the program included archery, athletics, dartchery, pentathlon, snooker, swimming, table tennis, weightlifting for men, wheelchair basketball for men and wheelchair fencing. England was the leading nation in the medal table, followed by Australia and Scotland.

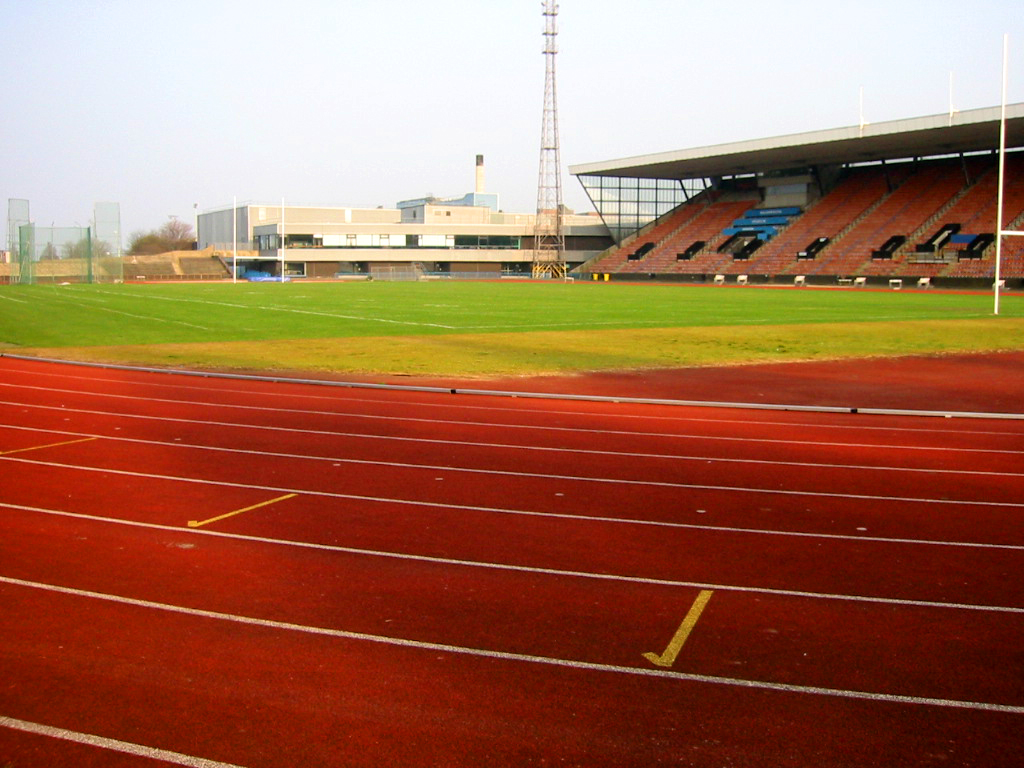
Meadowbank Stadium was the main venue for the 1966 Commonwealth Paraplegic Games at Edinburgh, Scotland

=== 3rd Commonwealth Paraplegic Games ===
The third Commonwealth Paraplegic Games were held in Edinburgh, Scotland in 1970. There were 192 athletes from 14 countries. Countries at this games that had not previously participated were Hong Kong, India, Malaysia, Malta and Uganda. The Games were opened by Prime Minister Edward Heath immediately after the Commonwealth Games which were also held in Edinburgh. The chairman of the Organising Committee was Lieutenant-Colonel John Fraser. Sporting events were held at Meadowbank Sports Centre and the Royal Commonwealth Pool, and the Games Village was based at RAF Turnhouse located at Edinburgh Airport. Sports on the program included archery, athletics, dartchery, lawn bowls, pentathlon, shooting, swimming, table tennis, weightlifting for men, wheelchair basketball for men and wheelchair fencing. England was the leading nation in the medal table, followed by Australia and Scotland.

=== 4th Commonwealth Paraplegic Games ===
The fourth Commonwealth Paraplegic Games were held in Dunedin, New Zealand in 1974. The Games were opened by Sir Denis Blundell, Governor General of New Zealand. The competing countries were: Australia, England, Fiji, Hong Kong, India, Jamaica, Kenya, Malaysia, New Zealand, Northern Ireland, Singapore, Scotland and Wales. Main venues were Caledonian Ground, Logan Park, University of Otago Physical Education Gymnasium, RSA Hall, Moana Pool and St Kilda Smallbore Rifle Range. Sports on the program included archery, athletics, dartchery, lawn bowls, pentathlon, shooting, snooker, swimming, table tennis, weightlifting for men, wheelchair basketball for men and wheelchair fencing. Australia was the leading nation in the medal table, followed by England and New Zealand.

== List of Commonwealth Paraplegic Games ==
Host cities of the Commonwealth Paraplegic Games

| Edition | Year | Host | Opened by | Dates | Nations | Competitors | Sports | Events | Top Nation |
|---|---|---|---|---|---|---|---|---|---|
| I | 1962 | Perth, Australia | Sir Charles Gairdner | 10–17 November | 9 | 93 | 14 | 88 | Australia |
| II | 1966 | Kingston, Jamaica | Prince Philip, Duke of Edinburgh | 14–20 August | 10 | 94 | 10 | 120 | England |
| III | 1970 | Edinburgh, Scotland | Edward Heath | 26 July – 1 August | 14 | 197 | 11 | 150 | England |
| IV | 1974 | Dunedin, New Zealand | Sir Denis Blundell | 13–19 January | 13 | 229 | 12 | 150 | Australia |

== All Medals (1962–1974) ==
| Rank | Nation | Gold | Silver | Bronze | Total |
|---|---|---|---|---|---|
| 1 | England (ENG) | 186 | 156 | 96 | 438 |
| 2 | Australia (AUS) | 145 | 124 | 113 | 382 |
| 3 | Jamaica (JAM) | 51 | 35 | 25 | 111 |
| 4 | Scotland (SCO) | 50 | 71 | 68 | 189 |
| 5 | New Zealand (NZL) | 44 | 42 | 30 | 116 |
| 6 | Rhodesia (RHO) | 15 | 3 | 5 | 23 |
| 7 | Wales (WAL) | 7 | 14 | 9 | 30 |
| 8 | Northern Ireland (NIR) | 5 | 10 | 5 | 20 |
| 9 | India (IND) | 2 | 0 | 2 | 4 |
| 10 | Ireland (IRL) | 1 | 2 | 6 | 9 |
| 11 | Trinidad and Tobago (TRI) | 1 | 1 | 0 | 2 |
| 11 | Uganda (UGA) | 1 | 1 | 0 | 2 |
| 13 | Fiji (FIJ) | 1 | 0 | 0 | 1 |
| 14 | Hong Kong (HKG) | 0 | 4 | 5 | 9 |
| 15 | Malaysia (MAS) | 0 | 3 | 1 | 4 |
| 16 | Malta (MLT) | 0 | 2 | 2 | 4 |
| 17 | Kenya (KEN) | 0 | 2 | 1 | 3 |
| 18 | Canada (CAN) | 0 | 0 | 1 | 1 |
| 18 | Singapore (SIN) | 0 | 0 | 1 | 1 |
| Totals (19 entries) | | 509 | 470 | 370 | 1,349 |

- Invitational Athletes won 2 silver and 1 bronze at 1974.
- Not all events awarded silver and bronze medals due to insufficient competitors.

== Medals ==
Not all events awarded silver and bronze medals due to insufficient competitors.

=== 1962 ===
Medal table
| Country | Gold | Silver | Bronze | Total |
|---|---|---|---|---|
| Australia | 38 | 29 | 23 | 90 |
| England | 30 | 41 | 19 | 90 |
| Rhodesia | 15 | 3 | 5 | 23 |
| Scotland | 2 | 10 | 4 | 16 |
| New Zealand | 2 | 0 | 0 | 2 |
| Wales | 1 | 0 | 1 | 2 |
| India | 1 | 0 | 2 | 3 |
| Singapore | 0 | 0 | 0 | 0 |
| Northern Ireland | 0 | 0 | 0 | 0 |
| Total | 89 | 83 | 54 | 226 |

=== 1966 ===
| Nations | Gold | Silver | Bronze |
|---|---|---|---|
| England | 64 | 50 | 30 |
| Australia | 33 | 28 | 22 |
| Scotland | 11 | 11 | 21 |
| Jamaica | 8 | 8 | 5 |
| Northern Ireland | 2 | 3 | 2 |
| New Zealand | 1 | 8 | 2 |
| Fiji | 1 | 0 | 0 |
| Wales | 0 | 5 | 3 |
| Trinidad and Tobago | 0 | 1 | 0 |
| Canada | 0 | 0 | 1 |
| | 120 | 114 | 86 |

=== 1970 ===
| Nations | Gold | Silver | Bronze | Total |
|---|---|---|---|---|
| England | 48 | 32 | 23 | 103 |
| Australia | 29 | 31 | 39 | 99 |
| Scotland | 27 | 29 | 21 | 77 |
| Jamaica | 25 | 14 | 10 | 49 |
| New Zealand | 12 | 14 | 4 | 30 |
| Wales | 5 | 6 | 2 | 13 |
| Ireland | 1 | 2 | 6 | 9 |
| Uganda | 1 | 1 | 0 | 2 |
| India | 1 | 0 | 0 | 1 |
| Trinidad and Tobago | 1 | 0 | 0 | 1 |
| Malta | 0 | 2 | 2 | 4 |
| Malaysia | 0 | 1 | 0 | 1 |
| Canada | 0 | 0 | 0 | 0 |
| British Hong Kong | 0 | 0 | 0 | 0 |
| | 150 | 132 | 107 | 389 |

=== 1974 ===
| Nations | Gold | Silver | Bronze | Total |
|---|---|---|---|---|
| Australia | 45 | 36 | 29 | 110 |
| England | 44 | 33 | 24 | 101 |
| New Zealand | 29 | 20 | 24 | 73 |
| Jamaica | 18 | 13 | 10 | 41 |
| Scotland | 10 | 21 | 22 | 53 |
| Northern Ireland | 3 | 7 | 3 | 13 |
| Wales | 1 | 3 | 3 | 7 |
| (British Hong Kong) Hong Kong | 0 | 4 | 5 | 9 |
| Invitational Athletes | 0 | 2 | 1 | 3 |
| Kenya | 0 | 2 | 1 | 3 |
| Malaysia | 0 | 2 | 1 | 3 |
| Singapore | 0 | 0 | 1 | 1 |
| Fiji | 0 | 0 | 0 | 0 |
| India | 0 | 0 | 0 | 0 |
| | 150 | 143 | 124 | 417 |

== Disestablishment and heritage ==
The Dunedin Games were the final Commonwealth Paraplegic Games mainly due to travel logistics and costs. The Commonwealth Paraplegic Games Committee recommended to the International Stoke Mandeville Games Committee that the 'World Zone Games' be established. These Games did not come into fruition. However, Sir George Bedbrook helped to establish a Pacific Rim competition called the Far East and South Pacific Games for the Disabled.

In the Commonwealth Games, athletes with a disability were first included in exhibition events at the 1994 Victoria Games in Canada. At the 2002 Manchester Games in England, they were included as full members of their national teams, making them the first fully inclusive international multi-sport games. This meant that results were included in the medal count. Twenty countries sent both male and female elite athletes with a disability to compete in ten events across five Para-Sports: Athletics, Lawn Bowls, Swimming, Table Tennis and Weightlifting. The inclusion of Para-Sport full medal events continued at the 2006 Melbourne Games in Australia where 189 elite athletes with a disability from 25 nations took part in Athletics, Swimming, Table Tennis and Powerlifting, competing for Games medals in 12 events.

== IPC and CGF cooperative agreement ==
During the 2007 General Assembly of the Commonwealth Games Federation (CGF) at Colombo, Sri Lanka, the International Paralympic Committee (IPC) and CGF signed a cooperative agreement to ensure a formal institutional relationship between the two bodies and secure the future participation of elite athletes with a disability (EAD) in future Commonwealth Games.

IPC President Philip Craven said during the General Assembly:

“We look forward to working with CGF to develop the possibilities of athletes with a disability at the Commonwealth Games and within the Commonwealth. This partnership will help to galvanize Paralympic sports development in Commonwealth countries/territories and seek to create and promote greater opportunities in sport for athletes with a disability.”

— IPC President Sir Philip Craven

The cooperation agreement outlined the strong partnership between the IPC and the CGF. It recognized the IPC as the organization for overseeing the coordination and delivery of the Commonwealth Games EAD sports programme and committed both organizations to work together in supporting the growth of the Paralympic and Commonwealth Games Movements.
