= 1966 Commonwealth Paraplegic Games =

II Commonwealth Paraplegic Games
- Host city: Kingston
- Country: Jamaica
- Nations: 10
- Athletes: 94 (72 Men/22 Women)
- Sport: 10
- Events: 120
- Opening: 14 August 1966
- Closing: 20 August 1966
- Opened by: Prince Philip
- Athlete's Oath: Derven Long (Jamaican Team Captain)
- Main venue: Polio Rehabilitation Centre, Mona

The second Commonwealth Paraplegic Games were held in Kingston, Jamaica from 14 to 20 August 1966. There were 133 athletes from 10 countries. The Games were opened by Prince Philip.

== Participating nations ==
The following nations participated at the games:

- Australia
- Canada
- England
- Fiji
- Jamaica
- New Zealand
- Northern Ireland
- Scotland
- Trinidad and Tobago
- Wales

== Sports ==
Sports on the program included:

- Archery
- Athletics
- Dartchery
- Pentathlon (Archery, Athletics & Swimming Events)
- Snooker
- Swimming
- Table Tennis
- Weightlifting (Men Only)
- Wheelchair Basketball (Men Only)
- Wheelchair Fencing

== Venues ==
Venue	Sport
University of the West Indies Sports Field	Archery, Dartchery, Field Events
Recreation Hall, Games Village, Mona	Weightlifting, Wheelchair Fencing
St. Andrews Club	Snooker
University of the West Indies Pool	Swimming
University of the West Indies Gym	Wheelchair Basketball
Old Library, Games Village, Mona	Table Tennis
National Stadium	Slalom, Wheelchair Races

== Performance ==
=== Australia ===
The Australian team included 8 men and 3 women. Ten members of the team had competed at the 1962 Games and come away with gold medals, but the total delegation was smaller than in 1962 owing to a lack of funds.

The only newcomer to the Australian team was John Martin. He competed in four sports, para-athletics, para-swimming, wheelchair basketball and table tennis. Martin won silver in the men's 50 yard freestyle Class C event.

Lorraine Dodd was Australia's only female competitor from Western Australia on the team. Going to the Games to compete in swimming, Dodd did not feel she had gotten in enough training.

Daphne Ceeney was another member of the Australian delegation, winning gold in wheelchair fencing. Ceeney set a world record in the women's 50 m freestyle Class D event in a Games record time of 45.6 seconds.

The Australian delegation included Mikko Tamminen, who won 5 medals at the Games. His gold medals were in shot put and middleweight weightlifting. His silvers were in the javelin and club throw. His sole bronze medal came in the discus. The Finnish born competitor immigrated to Australia in 1951 and was injured in an accident in 1957. He died a year after the 1966 Games took place.

Vic Renalson came away from the Games with 2 golds, 2 silver and 1 bronze. He competed in para-athletics in Kingston. Following the Games, he started to get involved with athletics coaching.

The team manager was Kevin Betts.

=== England ===
The English team included swimmer Sue Masham. She won silver in the women's 25 m breaststroke class A event. It also included swimmer Margaret Gibbs, who finished second in the women's 50 m freestyle Class D event.

=== Jamaica ===
The delegation from Jamaica included Octavius Morgan, who set a world record in the men's 50 yard freestyle Class C event in a time of 53.7 seconds.

=== New Zealand ===
New Zealand also participated in these Games. Their team manager was Max Steward. They had a better funding situation than their Australian competitors, but some team members withdrew early because of medical issues. The team included 1962 Games gold medalist Auckland's Pompey Heremaia. Heremaia competed in the precision javelin, snooker, shot put, club throw and wheelchair fencing. Heremaia and Wilf Martin were New Zealand's sole representatives at the 1962 Games; here Heremaia won medals in snooker and javelin.

=== Scotland ===
The Scottish team included Ruth Harvey, who claimed silver in women's wheelchair fencing.

=== Overall performance ===
England and Jamaica were leaders for medals in the pool. They had 3 gold medals each. Australia followed closely behind with 2. Scotland was the only other country with gold in the pool with one. World and other records fell in the pool. One was set by Lorraine Dodd in the women's 25 m breaststroke class A event, where she posted a world record time of 32.0 seconds.

== Final medal table ==
England, Australia and Scotland were the top three nations.

Nations	Gold	Silver	Bronze
England	64	50	30
Australia	33	28	22
Scotland	11	11	21
Jamaica	8	8	5
Northern Ireland	2	3	2
New Zealand	1	8	2
Fiji	1	0	0
Wales	0	5	3
Trinidad and Tobago	0	1	0
Canada	0	0	1
	120	114	86

== See also ==
- Commonwealth Paraplegic Games
- 1966 Commonwealth Games at Kingston, Jamaica
