= 1970 Commonwealth Paraplegic Games =

III Commonwealth Paraplegic Games
- Host city: Edinburgh, Scotland
- Nations: 14
- Athletes: 197 (145 Male/52 Female)
- Sport: 11
- Events: 150
- Opening: 26 July 1970
- Closing: 1 August 1970
- Opened by: Edward Heath
- Main venue: Meadowbank Stadium

The Third Commonwealth Paraplegic Games was a multi-sport event that was held in Edinburgh, Scotland from 26 July to 1 August 1970. Dubbed the "little games", they followed the 1970 British Commonwealth Games which were held in Edinburgh from 16 to 25 July of that year.

== Background and administration ==
The chairman of the Organising Committee was Lieutenant-Colonel John Fraser. It was also known as the "little games" and the "Wheelchair Games".

== Ceremonies ==
The Games were opened by the British Prime Minister Edward Heath. The opening ceremony was at Meadowbank stadium and was attended by a crowd of 2,000 people. The teams were led in by the hosts of the previous games, Jamaica. On behalf of all the competitors, James Laird, the Scottish team captain, took an oath. A message of support from the Provosts of 28 towns and cities across Scotland was read out, having been relayed from John o' Groats by runners from the Scottish Youth Clubs Association.

The games were closed by James MacKay, Lord Provost of the Edinburgh Corporation.

== Participating teams ==
197 athletes from fourteen Commonwealth countries took part. Countries at this games that had not previously participated were Hong Kong, India, Malaysia, Malta and Uganda.

- Australia
- Canada
- England
- Hong Kong
- India
- Jamaica
- Malaysia
- Malta
- New Zealand
- Northern Ireland
- Scotland
- Trinidad and Tobago
- Uganda
- Wales

== Sports ==
Sports included:

- Archery
- Athletics
- Dartchery
- Lawn Bowls
- Pentathlon (Archery, Athletics and Swimming Events)
- Shooting
- Swimming
- Table Tennis
- Weightlifting (Men Only)
- Wheelchair Basketball (Men Only)
- Wheelchair Fencing

== Venues ==
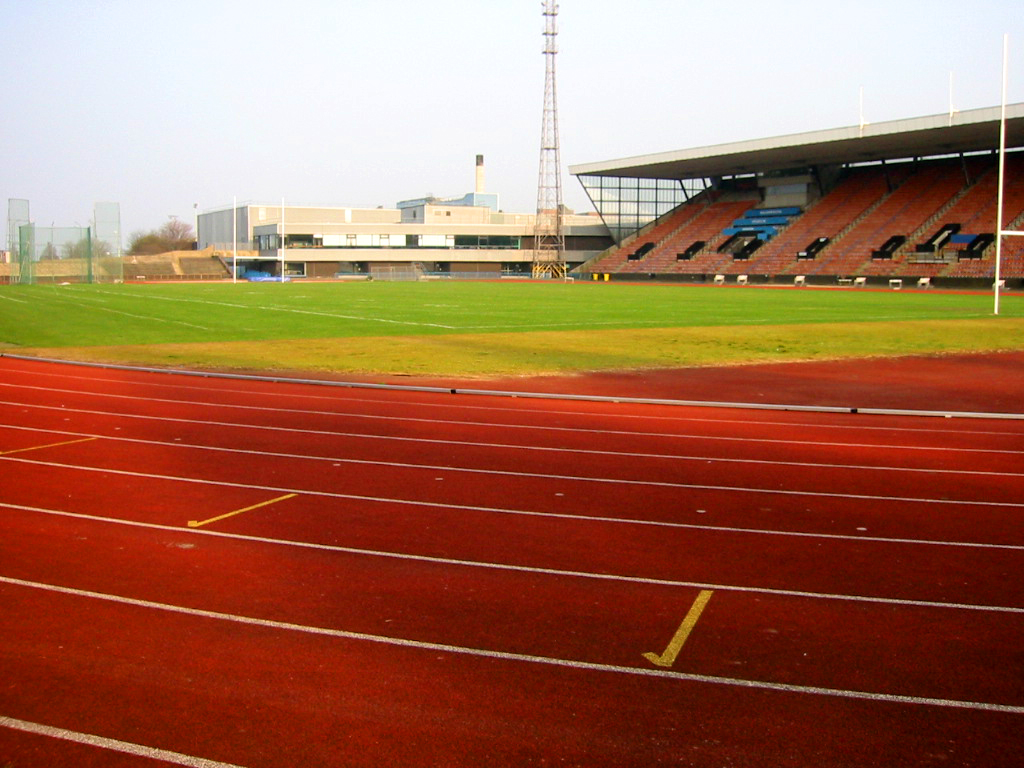
Meadowbank Stadium

The following were the venues for the games:

Venue	Sport
Games Village (RAF Turnhouse)	Archery, Precision Javelin
Meadowbank Sports Complex	All other sports including some archery
Royal Commonwealth Pool	Swimming
Lochend Bowling Green	Lawn Bowls
Redcraig Shooting Range	Shooting

== Logistics ==
An athletes' village was located at Turnhouse, with accommodation provided free of charge to the athletes by the Ministry of Defence. The Edinburgh Corporation had supplied fourteen adapted buses, which volunteer drivers used to transport the athletes between venues during the games. Athletics events were held at Meadowbank stadium. Shooting events were held at Redcraigs shooting range in West Lothian. There was some criticism of the lack of day-to-day television coverage from the BBC and ITV broadcasters.

== Medal table ==
The final medal table is:

Nations	Gold	Silver	Bronze	Total
England	48	32	23	103
Australia	29	31	39	99
Scotland	27	29	21	77
Jamaica	25	14	10	49
New Zealand	12	14	4	30
Wales	5	6	2	13
Ireland	1	2	6	9
Uganda	1	1	0	2
India	1	0	0	1
Trinidad and Tobago	1	0	0	1
Malta	0	2	2	4
Malaysia	0	1	0	1
Canada	0	0	0	0
British Hong Kong	0	0	0	0
	150	132	107	389

== See also ==
Commonwealth Games hosted in Scotland:

- 1970 Commonwealth Games in Edinburgh
- 1986 Commonwealth Games in Edinburgh
- 2014 Commonwealth Games in Glasgow
