= 1974 Commonwealth Paraplegic Games =

IV Commonwealth Paraplegic Games
- Host city: Dunedin, New Zealand
- Nations: 13 plus three invited individual athletes
- Athletes: 229 (175 Male / 54 Female)
- Sport: 12
- Events: 150
- Opening: 13 January 1974
- Closing: 19 January 1974
- Opened by: Sir Denis Blundell (Governor-General)
- Main venue: Caledonian Ground

The fourth Commonwealth Paraplegic Games were held in Dunedin, New Zealand from 13 to 19 January 1974. The Games were opened by Sir Denis Blundell, Governor-General of New Zealand.

== Participating nations ==
The competing countries and competitors were:

- Australia (53)
- England (53)
- Fiji (3)
- Hong Kong (17)
- India (1)
- Jamaica (15)
- Kenya (12)
- Malaysia (3)
- New Zealand (32)
- Northern Ireland (7)
- Singapore (2)
- Scotland (22)
- Wales (12)

Three New Zealand based competitors competed by special invitation of the organising committee – T. Cullen, R. Porter and P. Read.

== Sports ==
The following sports were included in the Games:

- Archery
- Athletics
- Dartchery
- Lawn Bowls
- Pentathlon (Archery, Athletics and Swimming Events)
- Shooting
- Snooker
- Swimming
- Table tennis
- Weightlifting (Men Only)
- Wheelchair Basketball (Men Only)
- Wheelchair Fencing

== Venues ==
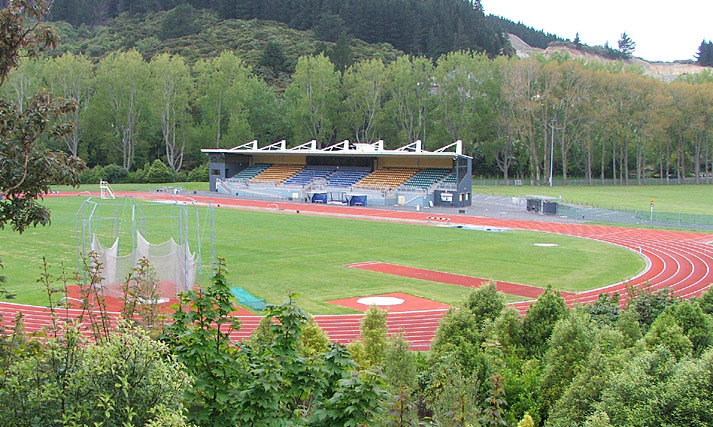
Caledonian Ground, Dunedin

The following were the venues used for the Games:

Venue	Sport
Caledonian Sports Ground	Athletics, Pentathlon, Wheelchair Basketball
Logan Park	Archery, Dartchery, Lawn Bowls, Pentathlon, Slalom
University of Otago Physical Education School Gym	Table tennis, Wheelchair Basketball
University of Otago Union Hall	Weightlifting, Wheelchair Fencing
Moana Pool	Pentathlon, Swimming
St Kilda Indoor Rifle Range	Shooting
RSA Billiard Room	Snooker
Otago Museum	Arts & Crafts Competition and Exhibition

== The Games ==
Australia's Gwen Milburn won gold in the women's 60 m track athletics event. Australia also picked up medals in the bowls event.

The Outstanding Performers in Dunedin

The most successful athlete in Dunedin amongst the men was P. Reid from Jamaica who won 4 gold and 1 silver medal in field events, pentathlon and swimming. Amongst the women the most successful athlete was Caz Bryant from England who won 5 gold, 1 silver and 1 bronze medal in fencing, field events, pentathlon, table tennis and track events.

== Medal table ==
Nations	Gold	Silver	Bronze	Total
Australia	45	36	29	110
England	44	33	24	101
New Zealand	29	20	24	73
Jamaica	18	13	10	41
Scotland	10	21	22	53
Northern Ireland	3	7	3	13
Wales	1	3	3	7
(British Hong Kong) Hong Kong	0	4	5	9
Invitational Athletes	0	2	1	3
Kenya	0	2	1	3
Malaysia	0	2	1	3
Singapore	0	0	1	1
Fiji	0	0	0	0
India	0	0	0	0
	150	143	124	417

== See also ==
Commonwealth Games hosted in New Zealand

- 1950 Commonwealth Games in Auckland
- 1974 Commonwealth Games in Christchurch
- 1990 Commonwealth Games in Auckland
