= Malaysia at the Paralympics =

- IPC code: MAS
- NPC: Paralympic Council of Malaysia
- Website: www.paralympic.org.my (in English)
- Medals Ranked 63rd: Gold 8 Silver 6 Bronze 7 Total 21

Summer appearances
- 1972; 1976–1984; 1988; 1992; 1996; 2000; 2004; 2008; 2012; 2016; 2020; 2024

Malaysia made its Paralympic Games début at the 1972 Summer Paralympics in Heidelberg, with a delegation of three athletes, all of whom competed in both track and field and weightlifting. The country was then absent for three consecutive editions of the Summer Paralympics, before making its return at the 1988 Games in Seoul. Malaysia has participated in every subsequent edition of the Summer Paralympics, but has never entered the Winter Paralympics.

Malaysians have won a total of 21 medals at the Paralympic Games: eight gold, six silver and seven bronze. Six of these medals have been obtained in weightlifting or its successor sport, powerlifting. Powerlifter Siow Lee Chan, in 2008, was both Malaysia's first female Paralympic medallist, and the first Malaysian in sixteen years to have won a Paralympic medal. In 2016, Malaysia won its first ever gold medal in athletics.

== Medal tables ==
=== Medals by Summer Games ===
Games	Athletes	Gold	Silver	Bronze	Total	Rank
(Italy) Rome 1960	did not participate					
(Japan) Tokyo 1964	did not participate					
(Israel) Tel Aviv 1968	did not participate					
(West Germany) Heidelberg 1972	4	0	0	0	0	−
(Canada) Toronto 1976	did not participate					
(Netherlands) Arnhem 1980	did not participate					
(United States) New York 1984/ (United Kingdom) Stoke Mandeville 1984	did not participate					
(South Korea) Seoul 1988	14	0	0	1	1	48
(Spain) Barcelona 1992	10	0	1	2	3	51
(United States) Atlanta 1996	6	0	0	0	0	–
(Australia) Sydney 2000	10	0	0	0	0	–
(Greece) Athens 2004	19	0	0	0	0	–
(China) Beijing 2008	10	0	0	1	1	69
(United Kingdom) London 2012	22	0	1	1	2	65
(Brazil) Rio de Janeiro 2016	21	3	0	1	4	36
(Japan) Tokyo 2020	22	3	2	0	5	39
(France) Paris 2024	30	2	2	1	5	42
(United States) Los Angeles 2028	Future Event					
(Australia) Brisbane 2032	Future Event					
Total		8	6	7	21	63

=== Medals by Summer Sports ===
Sport	Gold	Silver	Bronze	Total
Athletics	4	2	4	10
Powerlifting	2	1	1	4
Badminton	2	0	0	2
Weightlifting	0	1	2	3
Archery	0	1	0	1
Boccia	0	1	0	1
Totals (6 entries)	8	6	7	21

== List of medalists ==
Medal	Name	Games	Sport	Event
Bronze	Mariappan Perumal	1988 Seoul	Weightlifting	Men's 57 kg
Silver	Cheok Kon Fatt	1992 Barcelona	Weightlifting	Men's 52 kg
Bronze	Mariappan Perumal	1992 Barcelona	Weightlifting	Men's 60 kg
Bronze	Mohamad Khasseri Othman	1992 Barcelona	Athletics	Men's high jump B2
Bronze	Siow Lee Chan	2008 Beijing	Powerlifting	Women's 56 kg
Silver	Hasihin Sanawi	2012 London	Archery	Men's individual recurve W1/W2
Bronze	Muhammad Ziyad Zolkefli	2012 London	Athletics	Men's shot put F20
Gold	Mohamad Ridzuan Mohamad Puzi	2016 Rio de Janeiro	Athletics	Men's 100m T36
Gold	Muhammad Ziyad Zolkefli	2016 Rio de Janeiro	Athletics	Men's shot put F20
Gold	Abdul Latif Romly	2016 Rio de Janeiro	Athletics	Men's long jump T20
Bronze	Siti Noor Radiah Ismail	2016 Rio de Janeiro	Athletics	Women's long jump T20
Gold	Abdul Latif Romly	2020 Tokyo	Athletics	Men's long jump T20
Gold	Cheah Liek Hou	2020 Tokyo	Badminton	Men's singles SU5
Gold	Bonnie Bunyau Gustin	2020 Tokyo	Powerlifting	Men's 72 kg
Silver	Jong Yee Khie	2020 Tokyo	Powerlifting	Men's 107 kg
Silver	Chew Wei Lun	2020 Tokyo	Boccia	Mixed individual BC1
Gold	Cheah Liek Hou	2024 Paris	Badminton	Men's singles SU5
Gold	Bonnie Bunyau Gustin	2024 Paris	Powerlifting	Men's 72 kg
Silver	Muhammad Ziyad Zolkefli	2024 Paris	Athletics	Men's shot put F20
Silver	Abdul Latif Romly	2024 Paris	Athletics	Men's long jump T20
Bronze	Eddy Bernard	2024 Paris	Athletics	Men's 100 metres T44

=== Medals by individual ===
According to official data of the International Paralympic Committee. This is a list of people who have won two or more Paralympic medals for Malaysia.

Athlete	Sport	Years	Games	Gender	1st place, gold medalist(s)	2nd place, silver medalist(s)	3rd place, bronze medalist(s)	Total
**Abdul Latif Romly**	Athletics	2016–2024	Summer	Men	2	1	0	3
**Bonnie Bunyau Gustin**	Powerlifting	2020–2024	Summer	Men	2	0	0	2
**Cheah Liek Hou**	Badminton	2020–2024	Summer	Men	2	0	0	2
**Muhammad Ziyad Zolkefli**	Athletics	2012–2024	Summer	Men	1	1	1	3
Mariappan Perumal	Weightlifting	1988–1992	Summer	Men	0	0	2	2

- **People in bold** are still active competitors

== See also ==
- Malaysia at the Olympics
- Malaysia at the Deaflympics
