= Malaysia at the 2012 Summer Paralympics =

- IPC code: MAS
- NPC: Malaysian Paralympic Council
- Website: www.paralympic.org.my (in English)

in London
- Competitors: 22 in 8 sports
- Flag bearer: Muhammad Ziyad Zolkefli
- Medals Ranked 65th: Gold 0 Silver 1 Bronze 1 Total 2

Summer Paralympics appearances (overview)
- 1972; 1976–1984; 1988; 1992; 1996; 2000; 2004; 2008; 2012; 2016; 2020; 2024

Malaysia competed at the 2012 Summer Paralympics in London, United Kingdom from August 29 to September 9, 2012.

== Medalists ==
The country won two medals, a silver and a bronze.

Medal	Name	Sport	Event	Date
Silver	Hasihin Sanawi	Archery	Men's individual recurve W1/W2	3 September
Bronze	Muhammad Ziyad Zolkefli	Athletics	Men's shot put F20	7 September

== Archery ==
Men

Athlete	Event	Ranking round		Round of 32	Round of 16	Quarterfinals	Semifinals	Finals	
Athlete	Event	Score	Seed	Opposition score	Opposition score	Opposition score	Opposition score	Opposition score	Rank
Mohd Zafi Rahman Mat Saleh	Individual recurve W1/W2	481	24	Browne (GBR); L 0-6	did not advance				
Zulkifli Mat Zin	Individual recurve W1/W2	572	16	Demir (TUR); L 4-6	did not advance				
Hasihin Sanawi	Individual recurve W1/W2	559	19	You (KOR); W 6-2	Cheng (CHN); W 6-5	Jung (KOR); W 6-4	Ranjbarkivaj (IRI); W 6-5	de Pellegrin (ITA); L 5-6	2nd place, silver medalist(s)
Mohd Zafi Rahman Mat Saleh; Zulkifli Mat Zin; Hasihin Sanawi	Team recurve	1612	10	—	Turkey (TUR); L 190-197	did not advance			

== Athletics ==
Men’s Field Events

Athlete	Event	Final	
Athlete	Event	Distance	Rank
Mohd Saifuddin Ishak	Long Jump F13	6.30	5
Eryanto Bahtiar	Long Jump F46	6.35	7
Eryanto Bahtiar	Triple Jump F46	13.45	6
Muhammad Ziyad Zolkefli	Shot Put F20	15.21	3rd place, bronze medalist(s)
Adderin Majurin	Discus Throw F32-34	24.26 (726 pts)	15
Adderin Majurin	Javelin Throw F33-34	17.41	14
Faridul Bin Masri	Javelin Throw F54-56	36.78	4

Women’s Track and Road Events

Athlete	Event	Heat		Final	
Athlete	Event	Result	Rank	Result	Rank
Norsyazwani Abdullah	100m T38	15.34	5	did not advance	
Norsyazwani Abdullah	200m T38	31.83	5	did not advance	

Women’s Field Events

Athlete	Event	Final	
Athlete	Event	Distance	Rank
Hamela Devi Enikutty	Shot Put F11-12	9.77 (753 pts)	16
Hamela Devi Enikutty	Discus Throw F11-12	28.74 (630 pts)	10
Nursuhana Ramlan	Shot Put F20	10.71	7

== Cycling ==
=== Road ===
Men

Athlete	Event	Time	Rank
Mohd Khairul Hazwan Wahab; Pilot: Khairul Naim Azhar	Road Race B	DNF	
Mohd Khairul Hazwan Wahab; Pilot: Khairul Naim Azhar	Time Trial B	37:20.51	15

== Powerlifting ==
Men

Athlete	Event	Result	Rank
Mariappan Perumal	-75kg	170	8

Women

Athlete	Event	Result	Rank
Siow Lee Chan	-56kg	80	6
Sharifah Raudzah Syed Akil	-82.5kg	97	8

== Sailing ==
Athlete	Event	Race											Net points	Rank
Athlete	Event	1	2	3	4	5	6	7	8	9	10	11	Net points	Rank
Nurul Balawi; Al Mustakim Matrin	SKUD 18	10	8	(11)	9	4	5	9	9	11	8	CAN	73	9

== Swimming ==
Men

Athletes	Event	Heat		Final	
Athletes	Event	Time	Rank	Time	Rank
Zul Amirul Sidi Abdullah	50m freestyle S5	43.30	16	did not advance	
Zul Amirul Sidi Abdullah	50m backstroke S5	43.00	8 Q	43.21	8
Jamery Siga	50m freestyle S5	39.08	11	did not advance	
Jamery Siga	200m freestyle S5	3:18.52	10	did not advance	
Jamery Siga	50m backstroke S5	DSQ		did not advance	
Jamery Siga	50m butterfly S5	51.54	17	did not advance	

Qualifiers for the latter rounds (Q) of all events were decided on a time only basis, therefore positions shown are overall results versus competitors in all heats.

== Table tennis ==
Men

Athlete	Event	Group Stage			Round of 16	Quarterfinals	Semifinals	Final	
Athlete	Event	Opposition Result	Opposition Result	Rank	Opposition Result	Opposition Result	Opposition Result	Opposition Result	Rank
Koh Zhi Liang	Individual C9	Kubov (UKR); L 1-3	Bouvais (FRA); L 2-3	3	—	did not advance			
Mohamad Azwar Bakar	Individual C10	Lukyanov (RUS); W 3-1	Lu (CHN); L 1-3	2	—	did not advance			
Zhi Liang Koh; Mohamad Azwar Bakar	Team C9-10	—			Brazil (BRA); W 3-1	Ukraine (UKR); L 1-3	did not advance		

== Wheelchair Fencing ==
Men

Athlete	Event	Group Stage		Round of 16	Quarterfinals	Semifinals	Final	
Athlete	Event	Opposition Result	Rank	Opposition Result	Opposition Result	Opposition Result	Opposition Result	Rank
Abd Rahman Razali	Individual sabre A	Pylarinos (GRE); L 1-5; Frolov (RUS); L 0-5; Stanczuk (POL); L 3-5; Assine (FRA); L 1-5	15	did not advance				

== See also ==
- Malaysia at the 2012 Summer Olympics
