= Malaysia at the 1996 Summer Paralympics =

- IPC code: MAS
- NPC: Malaysian Paralympic Council
- Website: www.paralympic.org.my (in English)

in Atlanta
- Competitors: 6 in 3 sports
- Medals: Gold 0 Silver 0 Bronze 0 Total 0

Summer Paralympics appearances (overview)
- 1972; 1976–1984; 1988; 1992; 1996; 2000; 2004; 2008; 2012; 2016; 2020; 2024

Six male athletes from Malaysia competed at the 1996 Summer Paralympics in Atlanta, United States which was held from 16 August to 25 August. The country did not win any medals at these games.

== Sports ==
=== Athletics ===
==== Men's track events ====
| Athlete | Events | Heat | | Semifinal | | Final | |
| Athlete | Events | Time | Rank | Time | Rank | Time | Rank |
|---|---|---|---|---|---|---|---|
| Mohamad Khasseri Othman | 100 m T11 | 11.92 | 2 | Did not advance | | | |
| Mohamad Khasseri Othman | 200 m T11 | 24.74 | 4 | Did not advance | | | |

==== Men's field events ====
| Athlete | Events | Final | Rank |
|---|---|---|---|
| Kuttiapan Muniandy | Discus throw F46 | 28.82 | 9 |
| Kuttiapan Muniandy | Shot put F46 | 11.64 | 8 |
| Lee Sheng Chow | Discus throw F10 | 30.12 | 7 |
| Lee Sheng Chow | Shot put F10 | 10.10 | 5 |
| Mohamad Khasseri Othman | High jump F10-11 | 1.58 | 7 |

=== Powerlifting ===
| Athlete | Events | Final | |
| Athlete | Events | Results | Rank |
|---|---|---|---|
| Cheok Kon Fatt | Men's – 52kg | 145.0 | 4 |
| Mariappan Perumal | Men's – 60kg | 172.5 | 5 |

=== Swimming ===
| Athlete | Events | Heat | | Final | |
| Athlete | Events | Time | Rank | Time | Rank |
|---|---|---|---|---|---|
| Wong Chee Kin | 100m breaststroke SB4 | 2:14.64 | 9 | Did not advance | |
| Wong Chee Kin | 100m freestyle S5 | 1:52.83 | 11 | Did not advance | |
| Wong Chee Kin | 200m freestyle S5 | — | | 3:47.78 | 8 |
| Wong Chee Kin | 150m individual medley SM4 | 3:15.78 | 7 Q | 3:20.58 | 7 |

== See also ==
- Malaysia at the Paralympics
- Malaysia at the 1996 Summer Olympics
