= Malaysia at the 2004 Summer Paralympics =

- IPC code: MAS
- NPC: Malaysian Paralympic Council
- Website: www.paralympic.org.my (in English)

in Athens
- Competitors: 19 in 7 sports
- Medals Ranked 76th: Gold 0 Silver 0 Bronze 0 Total 0

Summer Paralympics appearances (overview)
- 1972; 1976–1984; 1988; 1992; 1996; 2000; 2004; 2008; 2012; 2016; 2020; 2024

Malaysia competed at the 2004 Summer Paralympics in Athens, Greece. The team included 19 athletes, 15 men and 4 women, but won no medals. These were the first games where the country sent athletes to compete in sporting events other than athletics, powerlifting, and swimming. As recently as the 2024 Summer Paralympics, this was the only time that the Malaysian contingent sent athletes to compete in judo.

== Sports ==
=== Archery ===
==== Men ====
Athlete	Event	Ranking round		Round of 32	Round of 16	Quarterfinals	Semifinals	Finals	
Athlete	Event	Score	Seed	Opposition score	Opposition score	Opposition score	Opposition score	Opposition score	Rank
Muhamad Salam Sidik	Men's individual W2	618	6	Hutnyk (UKR); W 153-145	Est (FRA); W 157-149	Oehme (GER); L 100-100*	Did not advance		
Zulkifli Mat Zin	Men's individual W2	556	28	Jung Y J (KOR); L 137-159	Did not advance				

- Muhamad Salam Sidik's quarterfinal against Mario Oehme was decided by additional arrows: he lost 5 arrows to 8.

=== Athletics ===
==== Men's track ====
Athlete	Class	Event	Heats		Semifinal		Final	
Athlete	Class	Event	Result	Rank	Result	Rank	Result	Rank
Lai Heng Niam	T36	100m	13.97	10	Did not advance			
Lai Heng Niam	T36	400m	1:08.85	10	Did not advance			
Mohd Hisham Khaironi	T12	100m	11.84	24	Did not advance			
Mohd Hisham Khaironi	T12	200m	23.63	11	Did not advance			

=== Judo ===
==== Men ====
Athlete	Event	Preliminary	Quarterfinals	Semifinals	Repechage round 1	Repechage round 2	Final/ Bronze medal contest
Athlete	Event	Opposition Result	Opposition Result	Opposition Result	Opposition Result	Opposition Result	Opposition Result
Yuong Chiat Looi	Men's +100kg	Bye	Rose (GBR); L 0000–1000	—N/a	Amakawa (JPN); L 0000-1000	Did not advance	

==== Women ====
Athlete	Event	Quarterfinals	Semifinals	Repechage round 1	Final/ Bronze medal contest
Athlete	Event	Opposition Result	Opposition Result	Opposition Result	Opposition Result
Dlanny Bagu	Women's 70kg	Bye	Pierce (USA); L 0000–1000	—N/a	Nagy (HUN); L 0000-1000

=== Powerlifting ===
==== Men ====
Athlete	Event	Result	Rank
Mohd Yuspi Md Dali	75kg	157.5	12
Cheok Kon Fatt	56kg	142.5	6
Chia Chem Koh	52kg	127.5	12
Wan Kamarulzaman Wan Mohd Nor	48kg	120.0	11
Mariappan Perumal	67.5kg	180.0	5
Ahmad Amil Usin	100kg	NMR	

==== Women ====
Athlete	Event	Result	Rank
Fatimah Wagiman	75kg	107.5	4
Siow Lee Chan	60kg	87.5	6

=== Swimming ===
==== Men ====
Athlete	Class	Event	Heats		Final	
Athlete	Class	Event	Result	Rank	Result	Rank
Zul Amirul Sidi Abdullah	S5	50m backstroke	44.47	8 Q	43.50	8
Wong Chee Kin	S5	200m freestyle	3:26.07	7 Q	3:20.96	7
Wong Chee Kin	SM4	150m individual medley	3:00.13	5	2:56.80	7

==== Women ====
Athlete	Class	Event	Heats		Final	
Athlete	Class	Event	Result	Rank	Result	Rank
Matia Baun Seling	SB7	100m breaststroke	2:08.35	11	Did not advance	

=== Wheelchair fencing ===
Athlete	Event	Qualification			Round of 16	Quarterfinal	Semifinal	Final / BM	
Athlete	Event	Opposition	Score	Rank	Opposition Score	Opposition Score	Opposition Score	Opposition Score	Rank
Hamzah Dulah	Men's foil A	Fung (HKG)	L 1-5	6	Did not advance				
Hamzah Dulah	Men's foil A	Al Qallaf (KUW)	L 3-5	6	Did not advance				
Hamzah Dulah	Men's foil A	Walisiewicz (POL)	L 2-5	6	Did not advance				
Hamzah Dulah	Men's foil A	El Assine (FRA)	L 1-5	6	Did not advance				
Hamzah Dulah	Men's foil A	Serafini (ITA)	L 2-5	6	Did not advance				
Hamzah Dulah	Men's sabre A	Jablonski (POL)	L 1-5	6	Did not advance				
Hamzah Dulah	Men's sabre A	Tai (HKG)	L 3-5	6	Did not advance				
Hamzah Dulah	Men's sabre A	More (FRA)	L 3-5	6	Did not advance				
Hamzah Dulah	Men's sabre A	Serafini (ITA)	L 2-5	6	Did not advance				
Hamzah Dulah	Men's sabre A	Ahner (GER)	L 2-5	6	Did not advance				

=== Wheelchair tennis ===
Athlete	Class	Event	Round of 64	Round of 32	Round of 16	Quarterfinals	Semifinals	Finals
Athlete	Class	Event	Opposition Result	Opposition Result	Opposition Result	Opposition Result	Opposition Result	Opposition Result
Zakaria Musa	Open	Men's singles	Lee H G (KOR); L 0–6, 0-6	Did not advance				

== See also ==
- Malaysia at the Paralympics
- Malaysia at the 2004 Summer Olympics
