= Malaysia at the 2000 Summer Paralympics =

- IPC code: MAS
- NPC: Malaysian Paralympic Council
- Website: www.paralympic.org.my (in English)

in Sydney
- Competitors: 10 in 3 sports
- Medals: Gold 0 Silver 0 Bronze 0 Total 0

Summer Paralympics appearances (overview)
- 1972; 1976–1984; 1988; 1992; 1996; 2000; 2004; 2008; 2012; 2016; 2020; 2024

Malaysia competed at the 2000 Summer Paralympics held in Sydney, Australia from 18 October to 29 October. There were a total of 10 athletes (8 men, 2 women) representing the country. The country did not win any medals at these games.

== Sports ==
=== Athletics ===
==== Men's track events ====
Athlete	Class	Events	Heats		Semifinal		Final	
Athlete	Class	Events	Result	Rank	Result	Rank	Result	Rank
Mohammed Hisham Khaironi	T12	100 m	11.65	1 Q	11.70	3	Did not advance	
Mohammed Hisham Khaironi	T12	200 m	23.78	2 Q	23.69	4	Did not advance	
Kasfino Kamarulzaman	T36	100 m	—		17.04	5	Did not advance	
Kasfino Kamarulzaman	T36	200 m	—		28.61	4 Q	31.21	8

==== Men's field events ====
Athlete	Events	Final	Rank
Mohammed Hisham Khaironi	High jump F12	—	NM
Mohammed Hisham Khaironi	Long jump F12	5.78	10
Lee Sheng Chow	Discus throw F11	26.87	13
Lee Sheng Chow	Shot put F11	10.76	7

Legend: NM = No mark

=== Powerlifting ===
==== Men's ====
Athlete	Events	Final	
Athlete	Events	Results	Rank
Ahmad Amil Usin	Men's – 100 kg	195.0	10
Cheok Kon Fatt	Men's – 56 kg	150.0	10
Mariappan Perumal	Men's – 67.5 kg	—N/a	NM

==== Women's ====
Athlete	Events	Final	
Athlete	Events	Results	Rank
Law King Kiew	Women's – 75 kg	195.0	10
Siow Lee Chan	Women's – 52 kg	—	NM

Legend: NM = No mark

=== Swimming ===
==== Men ====
Athlete	Events	Heats		Final	
Athlete	Events	Time	Rank	Time	Rank
Douglas Nyambong	100 m backstroke S11	1:27.17	5	Did not advance	
Douglas Nyambong	50 m freestyle S11	DSQ			
Douglas Nyambong	100 m freestyle S11	1:15.17	8	Did not advance	
Wong Chee Kin	50 m freestyle S5	50.22	7	Did not advance	
Wong Chee Kin	100 m freestyle S5	1:45.76	6	Did not advance	
Wong Chee Kin	150 m medley SM4	3:11.90	6	Did not advance	

== See also ==
- Malaysia at the 2000 Summer Olympics
- Malaysia at the Paralympics

== Bibliography ==
- International Paralympic Committee (2000). "Appendix C: Athlete Numbers - By Delegation". Sydney 2000 Paralympic Games Post Games Report. Sydney.
