= Malaysia at the 2024 Summer Paralympics =

- Flag of Malaysia
- IPC code: MAS
- NPC: Paralympic Council of Malaysia
- Website: www.paralympic.org.my (in English)

in Paris, France August 28, 2024 – September 8, 2024
- Competitors: 30 in 8 sports
- Flag bearers (opening): Bonnie Bunyau Gustin; Nur Suraiya Muhamad Zamri
- Flag bearer (closing): Muhammad Fareez Anuar
- Medals Ranked 42nd: Gold 2 Silver 2 Bronze 1 Total 5

Summer Paralympics appearances (overview)
- 1972; 1976–1984; 1988; 1992; 1996; 2000; 2004; 2008; 2012; 2016; 2020; 2024

Malaysia competed at the 2024 Summer Paralympics in Paris, France, from 28 August to 8 September. The country qualified 30 athletes in 8 sports. Subramaniam Raman Nair, secretary-general of the Paralympic Council Malaysia, was the chef de mission of the delegation.

Bonnie Bunyau Gustin and Nur Suraiya Muhamad Zamri were flag bearers of Malaysia in the opening ceremony. In the Parade of Nations, 24 participating athletes and officials wore traditional costumes designed by Rizman Ruzaini named 'The Malaya', featuring an olive green colour scheme and golden songket motifs to symbolise their gold medal aspirations like their Olympic counterparts. Similarly, the men wore the Baju Melayu Teluk Belanga, while the women wore the Baju Kurung with a kelubung.

Paralympic Council Malaysia set a four-gold medal target for the Malaysian delegation based on outstanding performances of three gold medals each at the Rio 2016 and Tokyo 2020 Games, but fell short as the delegation only managed to return with two golds, two silver and one bronze. Two of the three Tokyo 2020 gold medalists – shuttler Cheah Liek Hou and powerlifter Bonnie Bunyau Gustin retained their status in their respective events, with the latter broken a world record. On the other hand, Abdul Latif Romly had to settle for silver after losing to Neutral representative Matvei Iakushev due to an injury sustained during training.

== Medalists ==
Medal	Name	Sport	Event	Date
Gold	Cheah Liek Hou	Badminton	Men's singles SU5	2 September
Gold	Bonnie Bunyau Gustin	Powerlifting	Men's 72kg	6 September
Silver	Muhammad Ziyad Zolkefli	Athletics	Men's shot put F20	4 September
Silver	Abdul Latif Romly	Athletics	Men's long jump T20	8 September
Bronze	Eddy Bernard	Athletics	Men's 100 m T44	2 September

Medals by sport
Sport	1st place, gold medalist(s)	2nd place, silver medalist(s)	3rd place, bronze medalist(s)	Total
Badminton	1	0	0	1
Powerlifting	1	0	0	1
Athletics	0	2	1	3
Total	2	2	1	5

Medals by gender
Gender	1st place, gold medalist(s)	2nd place, silver medalist(s)	3rd place, bronze medalist(s)	Total
Male	2	2	1	5
Total	2	2	1	5

Medals by date
Date	1st place, gold medalist(s)	2nd place, silver medalist(s)	3rd place, bronze medalist(s)	Total
2 September	1	0	1	2
4 September	0	1	0	1
6 September	1	0	0	1
8 September	0	1	0	1
Total	2	2	1	5

== Competitors ==
The following is the list of number of competitors in the Games.

Sport	Men	Women	Total
Archery	2	1	3
Athletics	6	0	6
Badminton	5	0	5
Boccia	2	1	3
Cycling	2	4	6
Powerlifting	3	0	3
Swimming	2	0	2
Wheelchair tennis	2	0	2
Total	24	6	30

== Archery ==
Malaysia entered two male and one female archers into the games by virtue of their own result at the 2023 Asian Championships in Bangkok, Thailand; and at the 2024 World Qualification Tournament in Dubai, United Arab Emirates.

Athlete	Event	Ranking Round		Round of 32	Round of 16	Quarterfinals	Semifinals	Finals	
Athlete	Event	Score	Seed	Opposition Score	Opposition Score	Opposition Score	Opposition Score	Opposition Score	Rank
Daneshen Govinda Rajan	Men's individual compound	666	31	He (CHN); L 142–144	Did not advance				
Suresh Selvathamby	Men's individual recurve	625	12	Bennett (USA); W 6–2	Arab Ameri (IRI); L 2–6	Did not advance			
Nur Jannaton Abdul Jalil	Women's individual compound	646	24	Adhana (IND); L 124–138	Did not advance				
Daneshen Govinda Rajan; Nur Jannaton Abdul Jalil	Mixed team compound	646	12	—N/a	Italy; L 141–147	Did not advance			

== Athletics ==
Malaysian track and field athletes achieved quota places for the following events based on their results at the 2023 World Championships, 2024 World Championships, or through high performance allocation, as long as they meet the minimum entry standard (MES).

Key

- Note– Ranks given for track events are within the athlete's heat only
- Q = Qualified for the next round
- q = Qualified for the next round as a fastest loser or, in field events, by position without achieving the qualifying target
- DNS = Did Not Start
- DNF = Did Not Finish
- DQ = Disqualified
- PR = Paralympic Record
- AR = Area (or Continental) Record
- NR = National Record
- PB = Personal Best
- SB = Season Best
- N/A = Round not applicable for the event
- Bye = Athlete not required to compete in round

Men's track events

Athlete	Event	Final	
Athlete	Event	Result	Rank
Eddy Bernard	Men's 100 m T44	11.58 AR; PB	3rd place, bronze medalist(s)
Ammar Aiman Nor Azmi	Men's 400 m T20	48.38	4

Men's field events

Athlete	Event	Final	
Athlete	Event	Distance	Position
Muhammad Ziyad Zolkefli	Men's shot put F20	17.18	2nd place, silver medalist(s)
Wong Kar Gee	Men's long jump T12	6.85	4
Abdul Latif Romly	Men's long jump T20	7.45 SB	2nd place, silver medalist(s)
Muhammad Nazmi Nasri	Men's long jump T37	6.00	5

== Badminton ==
Malaysia has qualified four para badminton players for the following events, through the release of BWF para-badminton Race to Paris Paralympic Ranking.

Athlete	Event	Group Stage				Quarterfinals	Semifinals	Final / BM	
Athlete	Event	Opposition Score	Opposition Score	Opposition Score	Rank	Opposition Score	Opposition Score	Opposition Score	Rank
Muhammad Ikhwan Ramli	Men's singles WH1	Jeong (KOR); L (23–25, 21–17, 13–21)	Qu (CHN); L (7–21, 4–21)	—N/a	3	Did not advance			
Noor Azwan Noorlan	Men's singles WH2	Aránguiz (CHI); L (15–21, 13–21)	Chan (HKG); L (11–21, 11–21)	—N/a	3	—N/a	Did not advance		
Mohd Amin Burhanuddin	Men's singles SL4	Kadam (IND); L (21–17, 15–21, 20–22)	Teamarrom (THA); W (21–14, 22–20)	—N/a	2	—N/a	Did not advance		
Cheah Liek Hou	Men's singles SU5	Mróz (POL); W (21–10, 21–6)	Loquette (FRA); W (21–10, 21–16)	Nugroho (INA); W (21–10, 21–13)	1 Q	—N/a	Anrimusthi (INA); W (21–17, 21–17)	Nugroho (INA); W (21–13, 21–15)	1st place, gold medalist(s)
Muhammad Fareez Anuar	Men's singles SU5	Fang (TPE); W (21–14, 21–18)	Anrimusthi (INA); W (14–21, 21–19, 21–19)	Imai (JPN); W (17–21, 21–17, 21–17)	1 Q	—N/a	Nugroho (INA); L (12–21, 21–14, 6–21)	Anrimusthi (INA); L (21–17, 19–21, 12–21)	4
Noor Azwan Noorlan; Muhammad Ikhwan Ramli	Men's doubles WH1–2	Kajiwara / Murayama (JPN); L (21–17, 13–21, 16–21)	Qu / Mai (CHN); L (16–21, 6–21)	Wandschneider / Hellmann (GER); W (21–19, 21–17)	3	—N/a	Did not advance		

== Boccia ==
Malaysia entered two athletes, to compete in the BC4 event, by winning the silver medal in the mixed pairs event for BC4, at the 2024 Paralympic Qualification Tournament in Coimbra, Portugal.

Athlete	Event	Pool Matches				Playoffs	Quarterfinals	Semifinals	Final / BM	
Athlete	Event	Opposition Score	Opposition Score	Opposition Score	Rank	Opposition Score	Opposition Score	Opposition Score	Opposition Score	Rank
Lee Chee Hoong	Men's individual BC2	Herlangga (INA); L 2–11	Sugimura (JPN); L 5–6	Lan (CHN); W 3–1	3	Did not advance				16
Abdul Razzaq Abdul Rahman	Men's individual BC4	McGuire (GBR); L 0–8	Ciobanu (CAN); L 4–6	Kolinko (UKR); L 1–4	4	—N/a	Did not advance			13
Noor Askuzaimey Mat Salim	Women's individual BC4	Konenko (UKR); W 8–6	Levine (CAN); W 3–2	Elfar (EGY); W 11–3	1 Q	—N/a	Morfi Metzou (GRE); W 7–0	Cheung (HKG); L 0–7	Chica (COL); L 1–7	4
Abdul Razzaq Abdul Rahman; Noor Askuzaimey Mat Salim	Mixed pairs BC4	Colombia; L 2–5	Ukraine; W 5–4	—N/a	3	—N/a	Did not advance			9

== Cycling ==
Malaysia entered six para-cyclists (two male, four female athletes respectively) after they finished the top eligible nations at the 2022 UCI Nation's ranking allocation ranking.

=== Road ===
==== Men's road event ====
Athlete	Event	Time	Rank
Mohamad Yusof Hafizi Shaharuddin	Time trial C1	22:27.91	5
Mohamad Yusof Hafizi Shaharuddin	Road race C1–3	2:08:46	26
Muhammad Adi Raimie Amizazahan	Time trial C3	46:30.54	10
Muhammad Adi Raimie Amizazahan	Road race C1–3	1:56:23	16

==== Women's road event ====
Athlete	Event	Time	Rank
Nur Azlia Syafinaz Mohd Zais (Nurul Suhada Zainal – pilot)	Road race B	–1 LAP	
Nur Suraiya Muhammad Zamri (Farina Shawati Mohd Adnan – pilot)	Road time trial B	50:48.55	10

=== Track ===
==== Men's track event ====
Athlete	Event	Qualification		Final	
Athlete	Event	Time	Rank	Opposition Time	Rank
Mohamad Yusof Hafizi Shaharuddin	Individual pursuit C1	3:55.254	5	Did not advance	
Mohamad Yusof Hafizi Shaharuddin	1000m Time trial C1–3	1:09.487	8	Did not advance	
Muhammad Adi Raimie Amizazahan	Individual pursuit C3	3:47.922	7	Did not advance	
Muhammad Adi Raimie Amizazahan	1000m Time trial C1–3	1:13.780	11	Did not advance	

==== Women's track event ====
Athlete	Event	Qualification		Final	
Athlete	Event	Time	Rank	Opposition Time	Rank
Nur Azlia Syafinaz Mohd Zais (Nurul Suhada Zainal – pilot)	Individual pursuit B	3:49.029	8	Did not advance	
Nur Suraiya Muhammad Zamri (Farina Shawati Mohd Adnan – pilot)	1000m Time trial B	1:12.992	8	Did not advance	

== Powerlifting ==
Athlete	Events	Final	
Athlete	Events	Results	Rank
Bonnie Bunyau Gustin	Men's 72kg	232 WR; PR	1st place, gold medalist(s)
Nicodemus Manggoi Moses	Men's 97kg	210	7
Jong Yee Khie	Men's 107kg	208	7

== Swimming ==
Malaysia qualified one male athlete through the Minimum Qualification Standard (MQS) allocation slots.

Men

Athlete	Events	Heats		Final	
Athlete	Events	Time	Rank	Time	Rank
Muhammad Nur Syaiful Zulkafli	50 m freestyle S5	34.51	8 Q	34.34	7
Muhammad Nur Syaiful Zulkafli	100 m freestyle S5	1:16.82	6 Q	1:16.60	6
Muhammad Nur Syaiful Zulkafli	200 m freestyle S5	2:52.67	9 R	Did not advance	
Muhammad Nur Syaiful Zulkafli	100 m breaststroke SB4	1:45.15	5 Q	1:46.71	6
Imaan Aiman Redzuan	100 m backstroke S14	1:04.38	17	Did not advance	

== Wheelchair tennis ==
Malaysia qualified two players entries for wheelchair tennis.

Athlete	Event	Round of 64	Round of 32	Round of 16	Quarterfinals	Semifinals	Final / BM	
Athlete	Event	Opposition Result	Opposition Result	Opposition Result	Opposition Result	Opposition Result	Opposition Result	Rank
Abu Samah Borhan	Men's singles	Menguy (FRA); L 1–6, 2–6	Did not advance					
Yusshazwan Yusoff	Men's singles	Im (KOR); L 2–6, 3–6	Did not advance					
Abu Samah Borhan; Yusshazwan Yusoff	Men's doubles	—N/a	Bye	Caverzaschi / de la Puente (ESP); L 2–6, 3–6	Did not advance			

== See also ==
- Malaysia at the 2024 Summer Olympics
- Malaysia at the Paralympics
