= Malaysia at the 1992 Summer Paralympics =

- IPC code: MAS
- NPC: Malaysian Paralympic Council
- Website: www.paralympic.org.my (in English)

in Barcelona
- Competitors: 10 in 3 sports
- Medals Ranked 51st: Gold 0 Silver 1 Bronze 2 Total 3

Summer Paralympics appearances (overview)
- 1972; 1976–1984; 1988; 1992; 1996; 2000; 2004; 2008; 2012; 2016; 2020; 2024

Malaysia competed at the 1992 Summer Paralympics in Barcelona, Spain from 3 September to 14 September. The country sent 10 competitors (all of whom were male athletes) and won a total of 3 medals, 1 silver and 2 bronze, finishing joint 51st in the medal table along with Jamaica.

Malaysia won its first Paralympic silver medal at these games which was contributed by weightlifter Cheok Kon Fatt, as well as its first ever medal in athletics by high jumper Mohamad Khasseri Othman. Mariappan Perumal also continued his bronze medal streak from the previous Paralympic Games by winning a bronze medal in the men's 60kg weightlifting category.

== Medalists ==
Medal	Name	Sport	Event
Silver	Cheok Kon Fatt	Weightlifting	Men's -52kg
Bronze	Mohamad Khasseri Othman	Athletics	Men's high jump B2
Bronze	Mariappan Perumal	Weightlifting	Men's -60kg

== Sports ==
=== Athletics ===
==== Men's track events ====
Athlete	Events	Heat		Semifinals		Final	
Athlete	Events	Time	Rank	Time	Rank	Time	Rank
Heah Khee	100 m TW4	17.18	7	Did not advance			
Heah Khee	200 m TW4	DSQ					
Heah Khee	400 m TW4	DNS					
Mat Hanapi	200 m B2	25.25	3	—		Did not advance	
Mat Hanapi	400 m B2	—		55.30	3	Did not advance	
Mohamad Khasseri Othman	100 m B2	11.97	3 Q	11.99	5	Did not advance	
Mohamad Khasseri Othman	200 m B2	24.79	5	—		Did not advance	
Mohamad Zulkifli	100 m TW4	17.35	5	Did not advance			
Mohamad Zulkifli	200 m TW4	31.42	8	Did not advance			

==== Men's field events ====
Athlete	Events	Final	Rank
Mohamad Khasseri Othman	High jump B2	1.60	3rd place, bronze medalist(s)
Lee Sheng Chow	Discus throw B1	30.72	6
Lee Sheng Chow	Shot put B1	10.92	4

=== Weightlifting ===
Athlete	Events	Result	Rank
Cheok Kon Fatt	Men's – 52kg	140.0	2nd place, silver medalist(s)
Bensen Patta	Men's – 60kg	130.0	9
Mariappan Perumal	Men's – 60kg	170.0	3rd place, bronze medalist(s)

=== Swimming ===
Athlete	Events	Heat		Final	
Athlete	Events	Time	Rank	Time	Rank
Kathirivan Muniandy	50 m freestyle B3	DSQ			
Kathirivan Muniandy	100 m freestyle B3	1:06.79	7	Did not advance	
Wong Chee Kin	50 m backstroke S5	1:19.69	6	Did not advance	
Wong Chee Kin	100 m breaststroke SB4	2:13.42	7	Did not advance	
Wong Chee Kin	200 m freestyle S5	—		3:47.78	8
Wong Chee Kin	50 m freestyle S5	50.31	5	Did not advance	
Wong Chee Kin	100 m freestyle S5	1:44.84	4	Did not advance	
Wong Chee Kin	150 m individual medley SM4	3:15.51	2 Q	3:18.58	5

== See also ==
- Malaysia at the Paralympics
- Malaysia at the 1992 Summer Olympics
