= Malaysia at the 2008 Summer Paralympics =

- IPC code: MAS
- NPC: Malaysian Paralympic Council
- Website: www.paralympic.org.my (in English)

in Beijing
- Competitors: 11 in 5 sports
- Flag bearer: Mariappan Perumal
- Medals Ranked 69th: Gold 0 Silver 0 Bronze 1 Total 1

Summer Paralympics appearances (overview)
- 1972; 1976–1984; 1988; 1992; 1996; 2000; 2004; 2008; 2012; 2016; 2020; 2024

Malaysia sent a delegation to compete at the 2008 Summer Paralympics in Beijing.

== Medallists ==
Medal	Name	Sport	Event
Bronze	Siow Lee Chan	Powerlifting	Women's -56kg

== Sports ==
=== Archery ===
Athlete	Event	Ranking round		Round of 32	Round of 16	Quarterfinals	Semifinals	Finals	
Athlete	Event	Score	Seed	Opposition score	Opposition score	Opposition score	Opposition score	Opposition score	Rank
Muhamad Salam Sidik	Men's individual recurve W1/W2	620	8	Lisotta (ITA); W 97-90	Jung (KOR); L 94-106	did not advance			
Zulkifli Mat Zin	Men's individual recurve W1/W2	610	12	Kacina (SVK); W 96-83	Cheng C (CHN); L 103-108	did not advance			

=== Athletics ===
==== Men's track ====
Athlete	Class	Event	Heats		Final	
Athlete	Class	Event	Result	Rank	Result	Rank
Mohd Raduan Emeari	T36	100m	—		12.64	7

=== Powerlifting ===
==== Men ====
Athlete	Event	Result	Rank
Cheok Kon Fatt	52kg	137.5	8
Mariappan Perumal	67.5kg	180.0	8

==== Women ====
Athlete	Event	Result	Rank
Siow Lee Chan	56kg	95.0	3rd place, bronze medalist(s)
Sharifah Raudzah Syed Akil	82.5kg	117.5	6

=== Sailing ===
Malaysians competed in the following event in sailing:

- Two-Person Keelboat - SKUD18

=== Swimming ===
==== Men ====
Athlete	Class	Event	Heats		Final	
Athlete	Class	Event	Result	Rank	Result	Rank
Yusup Dewa	S6	50m freestyle	35.24	13	did not advance	
Zul Amirul Sidi Abdullah	S5	50m backstroke	42.74	5 Q	42.95	5

== See also ==
- 2008 Summer Paralympics
- Malaysia at the Paralympics
- Malaysia at the 2008 Summer Olympics
