= Malaysia at the 1988 Summer Paralympics =

- IPC code: MAS
- NPC: Malaysian Paralympic Council
- Website: www.paralympic.org.my (in English)

in Seoul
- Competitors: 14 in 3 sports
- Medals Ranked 48th: Gold 0 Silver 0 Bronze 1 Total 1

Summer Paralympics appearances (overview)
- 1972; 1976–1984; 1988; 1992; 1996; 2000; 2004; 2008; 2012; 2016; 2020; 2024

Malaysia competed at the 1988 Summer Paralympics in Seoul, South Korea from 15 October to 24 October. The country qualified 14 competitors (12 male and 2 female athletes) and finished 48th at the medal table after achieving its first Paralympic medal ever as well as its first Paralympic medal in weightlifting which was contributed by Mariappan Perumal who managed to clinch a bronze medal in the men's 57kg weightlifting event.

== Medalists ==
Medal	Name	Sport	Event
Bronze	Mariappan Perumal	Weightlifting	Men's -57kg

== Sports ==
=== Athletics ===
==== Men's track events ====
Athlete	Events	Heats		Semifinals		Final	
Athlete	Events	Time	Rank	Time	Rank	Time	Rank
Chag Kgee Chaw	200 m 3	36.12	5	35.87	6	Did not advance	
Heah Khee	400 m 3	1:14.18	4 Q	1:11.62	8	Did not advance	
Mohammed Ali bin Zulkifli	200 m 3	35.17	4	35.91	7	Did not advance	
Mohammed Ali bin Zulkifli	400 m 3	1:10.12	5	1:10.11	6	Did not advance	
Mohammed Zamri bin Misran	200 m 4	35.07	3	34.96	7	Did not advance	
Narayanan Iyyayoo	100 m 4	Bye		16.72	3	17.09	6
Narayanan Iyyayoo	200 m 4	34.26	2	32.83	4	33.73	7
Narayanan Iyyayoo	400 m 4	R1 1:10.24	2 Q	1:09.20	7	Did not advance	
Narayanan Iyyayoo	400 m 4	R2 1:07.89	5 Q	1:09.20	7	Did not advance	
Namburaja Veerasamy	400 m B3	58.03	6	—		Did not advance	

==== Women's track events ====
Athlete	Events	Final	
Athlete	Events	Time	Rank
Chan Bee Ling	100 m B3	14.60	5

==== Men's field events ====
Athlete	Events	Final	Rank
Dulau Simon Ansim	Shot put B1	8.94	5
Dulau Simon Ansim	Discus throw B1	22.68	7
Lee Sheng Chow	Shot put B1	9.27	4
Lee Sheng Chow	Discus throw B1	23.84	6

==== Women's field events ====
Athlete	Events	Final	Rank
Chan Bee Ling	Long jump B3	4.22	5

=== Weightlifting ===
==== Men's events ====
Athlete	Event	Result	Rank
Cheok Kon Fatt	Men's – 51kg	140.0	6
Taisen Sen Chan	Men's – 51kg	130.0	10
Mariappan Perumal	Men's – 57kg	165.0	3rd place, bronze medalist(s)

=== Swimming ===
==== Men ====
Athlete	Events	Heats		Final	
Athlete	Events	Time	Rank	Time	Rank
Kathirivan Muniandy	50 m breaststroke B2	42.18	2	Did not advance	
Kathirivan Muniandy	100 m breaststroke B2	1:30.45	4	Did not advance	
Kathirivan Muniandy	100 m freestyle B2	1:09.98	3	Did not advance	

==== Women ====
Athlete	Events	Heats		Final	
Athlete	Events	Time	Rank	Time	Rank
Khoo Su Ching	50 m breaststroke B3	48.20	6	Did not advance	
Khoo Su Ching	100 m breaststroke B3	1:51.61	6	Did not advance	

== See also ==
- Malaysia at the Paralympics
- Malaysia at the 1988 Summer Olympics
