= Malaysia at the 2020 Summer Paralympics =

- Flag of Malaysia
- IPC code: MAS
- NPC: Paralympic Council of Malaysia
- Website: www.paralympic.org.my (in English)

in Tokyo
- Competitors: 22 in 9 sports
- Flag bearers (opening): Bonnie Bunyau Gustin; Siti Noor Iasah
- Flag bearer (closing): Cheah Liek Hou
- Medals Ranked 39th: Gold 3 Silver 2 Bronze 0 Total 5

Summer Paralympics appearances (overview)
- 1972; 1976–1984; 1988; 1992; 1996; 2000; 2004; 2008; 2012; 2016; 2020; 2024

Malaysia competed in the 2020 Summer Paralympics in Tokyo, Japan from 24 August to 5 September 2021 which was postponed due to the COVID-19 pandemic.

Dato' Sri Megat D Shahriman Bin Dato' Zaharudin, president of the Malaysian Paralympic Council, is the chef de mission of the delegation.

== Medalists ==
Medal	Name	Sport	Event	Date
Gold	Bonnie Bunyau Gustin	Powerlifting	Men's 72 kg	28 August
Gold	Cheah Liek Hou	Badminton	Men's Singles SU5	4 September
Gold	Abdul Latif Romly	Athletics	Men's Long jump T20	4 September
Silver	Jong Yee Khie	Powerlifting	Men's 107 kg	30 August
Silver	Chew Wei Lun	Boccia	Mixed individual BC1	1 September

== Background ==
=== Opening and closing ceremonies ===
Bonnie Bunyau Gustin and Siti Noor Iasah Mohamad Ariffin were flag bearers of Malaysia in the opening ceremony. In the Parade of Nations, both athletes and officials wore the Malay legendary warrior Hang Tuah inspired attire designed by the Department of fashion design and Art and Design Faculty of Universiti Teknologi MARA (UiTM) in Shah Alam (Main Campus). The attire, in the colours of the national flag, featured the "Songket Bunga Tabur" pattern. The female athletes and official wore the baju kurung complete with a dokoh (tiered pendant) and selendang (shawl), while the male athletes and officials wore the traditional Baju Melayu complete with an outer coat, a sampin and the Tengkolok (headgear).

Shuttler Cheah Liek Hou was named as flagbearer for the closing ceremony.

=== Target and achievement ===
On 19 July 2021, Youth and Sports Minister Datuk Seri Reezal Merican Naina Merican announced that the Malaysian delegation to the 2020 Summer Paralympics had a target to win three gold medals, matching the medal haul of the previous edition in Rio de Janeiro, Brazil. Malaysia managed to achieve this target with three gold medals and two silver medals, totalling to 5 medals, making it the most successful outcome in Paralympic history, surpassing their record of four medals in the 2016 games.

== Competitors ==
The following is the list of number of competitors in the Games:

Sport	Men	Women	Total
Archery	2	0	2
Athletics	4	1	5
Badminton	2	0	2
Boccia	1	0	1
Cycling	3	2	5
Powerlifting	2	0	2
Swimming	2	1	3
Table tennis	1	0	1
Wheelchair Tennis	1	0	1
Total	18	4	22

== Archery ==
Malaysia have qualified 2 quota for archery.

Men

Athlete	Event	Ranking round		Round of 64	Round of 32	Round of 16	Quarterfinals	Semifinals	Final / BM	
Athlete	Event	Score	Seed	Opposition Score	Opposition Score	Opposition Score	Opposition Score	Opposition Score	Opposition Score	Rank
Suresh Selvathamby	Individual recurve	579	28	—N/a	Tsydendorzhiev (RPC); L 2–6	Did not advance				
Wiro Julin	Individual compound open	673	26	Bye	Shigaev (RPC); L 126–136	Did not advance				

== Athletics ==
All male athletes have qualified from the 2019 World Para Athletics Championships at Dubai. They have qualified by being top 3 in each event. Malaysia have also entered 1 female athlete.

Key

- Note–Ranks given for track events are within the athlete's heat only
- Q = Qualified for the next round
- q = Qualified for the next round as a fastest loser or, in field events, by position without achieving the qualifying target
- PB = Personal Best
- SB = Season Best
- DNS = Did not start

Men's track events

Athlete	Events	Heat		Final	
Athlete	Events	Time	Rank	Time	Rank
Mohamad Ridzuan Mohamad Puzi	100 m T36	12.06	1 Q SB	12.15	4

Men's field events

Athlete	Events	Final	Rank
Wong Kar Gee	Long jump T13	5.93 PB	6
Abdul Latif Romly	Long jump T20	7.45 SB	1st place, gold medalist(s)
Muhammad Ziyad Zolkefli	Shot put F20	DNS	

Women's track events

Athlete	Events	Heat		Final	
Athlete	Events	Time	Rank	Time	Rank
Siti Noor Iasah Mohamad Ariffin	400 m T20	59.89	4 q SB	1:01.05	8

== Badminton ==
Malaysia has qualified two para badminton players for each of the following events into the Paralympic tournament based on the Para Badminton World Rankings.

Men

Athlete	Event	Group stage				Semifinal	Final / BM	
Athlete	Event	Opposition Score	Opposition Score	Opposition Score	Rank	Opposition Score	Opposition Score	Rank
Cheah Liek Hou	Singles SU5	Eldakrory (EGY); W (21–3, 21–2)	Fang (TPE); W (21–13, 21–8)	Imai (JPN); W (21–19, 21–12)	1 Q	Fang (TPE); W (15–21, 21–10, 21–16)	Dheva (INA); W (21–17, 21–15)	1st place, gold medalist(s)
Didin Taresoh	Singles SH6	Nagar (IND); L (20–22, 10–21)	Tavares (BRA); L (13–21, 13^{r}–18)	—N/a	3	Did not advance		

== Boccia ==
Chew Wei Lun get a ticket for Malaysia in Individual BC1 events.

Athlete	Event	Pool matches					Quarterfinals	Semifinals	Final / BM	
Athlete	Event	Opposition Score	Opposition Score	Opposition Score	Opposition Score	Rank	Opposition Score	Opposition Score	Opposition Score	Rank
Chew Wei Lun	Mixed individual BC1	Oliveira (BRA); W 5–2	Huadpradit (THA); W 3*–3	Jung (KOR); W 9–3	Curinova (CZE); W 11–0	1 Q	Zhang (CHN); W 4–2	Ramos (POR); W 9–5	Smith (GBR); L 2–4	2nd place, silver medalist(s)

== Cycling ==
Malaysia sent three male and two female cyclists after allocations from the combined nations ranking.

=== Road ===
Men's road event

Athlete	Event	Time	Rank
Mohamad Yusof Hafizi Shaharuddin	Time trial C1	26:46.56	5
Mohamad Yusof Hafizi Shaharuddin	Road race C1–3	-1 LAP	33
Muhammad Hafiz Jamali	Time trial C5	1:01:35.78	12
Zuhairie Ahmad Tarmizi	Time trial C5	DNF	

Women's road event

Athlete	Event	Time	Rank
Nur Azlia Syafinaz Mohd Zais (Nurul Suhada Zainal – pilot)	Time trial B	DNF	
Nur Azlia Syafinaz Mohd Zais (Nurul Suhada Zainal – pilot)	Road race B	DNS	

=== Track ===
Men's track event

Athlete	Event	Qualification		Final	
Athlete	Event	Time	Rank	Opposition Time	Rank
Mohamad Yusof Hafizi Shaharuddin	Individual pursuit C1	3:58.413	7	Did not advance	
Muhammad Hafiz Jamali	1000m Time trial C4–5	—N/a		1:11.288	19
Zuhairie Ahmad Tarmizi	1000m Time trial C4–5	—N/a		1:06.472	10
Mohamad Yusof Hafizi Shaharuddin; Muhammad Hafiz Jamali; Zuhairie Ahmad Tarmizi	Mixed team sprint	50.532	5	Did not advance	

Women's track event

Athlete	Event	Qualification		Final	
Athlete	Event	Time	Rank	Opposition Time	Rank
Nur Azlia Syafinaz Mohd Zais (Nurul Suhada Zainal – pilot)	1000m Time trial B	—N/a		1:15.005	9

== Powerlifting ==
Bonnie Bunyau Gustin get a ticket for Malaysia in Mens 65kg event.

Athlete	Events	Final	
Athlete	Events	Results	Rank
Bonnie Bunyau Gustin	Men's -72kg	228; PR	1st place, gold medalist(s)
Jong Yee Khie	Men's -107kg	237	2nd place, silver medalist(s)

== Swimming ==
Muhammad Nur Syaiful Zulkafli and Brenda Anellia Larry has successfully entered the paralympic slot after breaking the MQS.

Men

Athlete	Event	Heats		Final	
Athlete	Event	Result	Rank	Result	Rank
Muhammad Nur Syaiful Zulkafli	50 metre freestyle S5	33.46	5 Q	32.82	5
Muhammad Nur Syaiful Zulkafli	100 metre freestyle S5	1:16.33	7 Q	1:15.12	7
Muhammad Nur Syaiful Zulkafli	200 metre freestyle S5	DSQ		Did not advance	
Muhammad Nur Syaiful Zulkafli	100 metre breaststroke SB4	DSQ		Did not advance	
Jamery Siga	50 metre butterfly S5	40.32	13	Did not advance	

Women

Athlete	Event	Heats		Final	
Athlete	Event	Result	Rank	Result	Rank
Brenda Anellia Larry	50 metre backstroke S4	59.33	11	Did not advance	
Brenda Anellia Larry	50 metre butterfly S5	1:00.62	13	Did not advance	

== Table tennis ==
Men's

Athlete	Event	Group stage				Round 1	Quarterfinals	Semifinals	Final/BM	
Athlete	Event	Opposition Result	Opposition Result	Opposition Result	Rank	Opposition Result	Opposition Result	Opposition Result	Opposition Result	Rank
Chee Chaoming	Individual – Class 9	Kalem (ITA); L 0–3	Stacey (GBR); L 0–3	Ma Lin (AUS); L 0–3	4	Did not advance				

== Wheelchair tennis ==
Malaysia qualified one player for wheelchair tennis. Abu Samah Borhan qualified by the world rankings.

Athlete	Event	Round of 64	Round of 32	Round of 16	Quarterfinals	Semifinals	Final / BM	
Athlete	Event	Opposition Result	Opposition Result	Opposition Result	Opposition Result	Opposition Result	Opposition Result	Rank
Abu Samah Borhan	Men's singles	Gil (CRC); W 4–6, 6–3, 6–2	Egberink (NED); L 0–6, 1–6	Did not advance				

== See also ==
- Malaysia at the Paralympics
- Malaysia at the 2020 Summer Olympics
