= Malaysia at the 2016 Summer Paralympics =

- IPC code: MAS
- NPC: Malaysian Paralympic Council
- Website: www.paralympic.org.my (in English)

in Rio de Janeiro
- Competitors: 19 in 8 sports
- Flag bearer: Abdul Latif Romly
- Medals Ranked 36th: Gold 3 Silver 0 Bronze 1 Total 4

Summer Paralympics appearances (overview)
- 1972; 1976–1984; 1988; 1992; 1996; 2000; 2004; 2008; 2012; 2016; 2020; 2024

Malaysia sent athletes to the 2016 Summer Paralympics in Rio de Janeiro, Brazil, from 7 September to 18 September 2016. The country qualified athletes in archery, cycling, sailing, wheelchair tennis, athletics and swimming. Dr Ang Kean Koo was the chef de mission of the Malaysian delegation.

Malaysia won its first three gold medals in Paralympics history through the sport of athletics, which are contributed by sprinter Mohamad Ridzuan Mohamad Puzi, shot putter Muhammad Ziyad Zolkefli and long jumper Abdul Latif Romly who was also the flag bearer at the opening ceremony.

== Funding ==
The National Sports Council in Malaysia identified 61 Paralympic qualifying events in 13 sports for the 2016 Summer Paralympics and provided them with funding assistance to athletes to compete in them as part of their qualifying campaigns. They also provided local training for athletes.

== Medallists ==
The following Malaysian competitors won medals at the Games.

Medal	Name	Sport	Event	Date
Gold	Mohamad Ridzuan Mohamad Puzi	Athletics	Men's 100m T36	10 September
Gold	Muhammad Ziyad Zolkefli	Athletics	Men's shot put F20	10 September
Gold	Abdul Latif Romly	Athletics	Men's Long Jump T20	11 September
Bronze	Siti Noor Radiah Ismail	Athletics	Women's Long jump T20	15 September

Medals by sport
Sport	1st place, gold medalist(s)	2nd place, silver medalist(s)	3rd place, bronze medalist(s)	Total
Athletics	3	0	1	4
Total	3	0	1	4

Medals by date
Day	Date	Gold medal	Silver medal	Bronze medal	Total
3	10 Sept	2	0	0	2
4	11 Sept	1	0	0	1
8	15 Sept	0	0	1	1
Total		3	0	1	4

== Archery ==
Archery was one of the sports where competitors benefited from the funding of the National Sports Council in Malaysia to try to qualify for the 2016 Games.

Men's

Athlete	Event	Ranking round		Round of 32	Round of 16	Quarterfinals	Semifinals	Final / BM	
Athlete	Event	Score	Seed	Opposition Score	Opposition Score	Opposition Score	Opposition Score	Opposition Score	Rank
Hasihin Sanawi	Individual recurve open	567	25	Sawicki (POL); L 0-6	did not advance				
Yuhaizam Yahaya	Individual compound open	622	30	Nori (IRI); L 126-136	did not advance				

== Athletics ==
Men's track events

Athlete	Events	Heat		Final	
Athlete	Events	Time	Rank	Time	Rank
Mohamad Faizal Aideal Suhaimi	100 m T13	11.30	6	did not advance	
Mohamad Faizal Aideal Suhaimi	100 m T12	did not start^{Note 1}			
Mohamad Ridzuan Mohamad Puzi	100 m T36	—N/a		12.07 PR	1st place, gold medalist(s)
Nasharuddin Mohd	400 m T20	51.75	5	did not advance	
Krishna Kumar Hari Das	400 m T38	59.07 SB	4	did not advance	

^Note 1 Mohamad Faizal Aideal Suhaimi was originally qualified for T12 event but later recategorised to T13 event.

Men's field events

Athlete	Events	Final	Rank
Abdul Latif Romly	Long jump T20	7.60 WR	1st place, gold medalist(s)
Mohamad Ridzuan Mohamad Puzi	Long jump T36	5.36	4
Amir Firdauss Jamaluddin	Long jump T38	4.87	9
Muhammad Ziyad Zolkefli	Shot put F20	16.84 WR	1st place, gold medalist(s)

Women's track events

Athlete	Events	Heat		Final	
Athlete	Events	Time	Rank	Time	Rank
Siti Noor Iasah Mohamad Ariffin	400 m T20	58.96	1Q RR	58.55	4

Women's field events

Athlete	Events	Final	Rank
Siti Noor Iasah Mohamad Ariffin	Long jump T20	4.91	4
Siti Noor Radiah Ismail	Long jump T20	5.20 RR	3rd place, bronze medalist(s)

Legend: DSQ =Disqualified Fn =False Start IPC 17.8 =Disqualified by rule IPC 17.8 PB =Personal Best PR =Paralympic Record RR =Regional Record SB =Seasonal Best WR =World Record

== Cycling ==
With one pathway for qualification being one highest ranked NPCs on the UCI Para-Cycling male and female Nations Ranking Lists on 31 December 2014, Malaysia qualified for the 2016 Summer Paralympics in Rio, assuming they continued to meet all other eligibility requirements.

Men's track cycling event

Athlete	Events	Qualification		Final	
Athlete	Events	Time	Rank	Opposition Time	Rank
Afiq Afify Rizan (Faizal Mohd Noh - pilot)	Men's B 1000m Time Trial	—N/a		DNS	
Afiq Afify Rizan (Faizal Mohd Noh - pilot)	Men's B 4000m Time Trial	4:51.906	14	did not advance	

Legend: DNS =Did not start PR =Paralympic Record WR =World Record

Men's road event

Athlete	Events	Qualification		Final	
Athlete	Events	Time	Rank	Opposition Time	Rank
Mohd Khairul Hazwan Wahab (Muhamad Rauf Nur Misbah - pilot)	Men's Time Trial B	—N/a		40:06.96	18
Mohd Khairul Hazwan Wahab (Muhamad Rauf Nur Misbah - pilot)	Men's Road Race B	—N/a		2:41:52	14

== Powerlifting ==
Athlete	Events	Qualification		Final	
Athlete	Events	Time	Rank	Results	Rank
Jong Yee Khie	Men's -97kg	—N/a		202	7
Mohd Shahmil Md Saad	Men's -107kg	—N/a		196	8

== Sailing ==
One pathway for qualifying for Rio involved having a boat have top seven finish at the 2015 Combined World Championships in a medal event where the country had not already qualified through via the 2014 IFDS Sailing World Championships. Malaysia qualified for the 2016 Games under this criterion in the SKUD 18 event with a sixteenth-place finish overall and the seventh country who had not qualified via the 2014 Championships. The boat was crewed by Nurul Amilin Balawi and Junell Mustafah.

Athlete	Event	Race											Net points	Rank
Athlete	Event	1	2	3	4	5	6	7	8	9	10	11	Net points	Rank
Al Mustakim Matrin	1-Person Keelboat (2.4mR)	14	9	DNF	10	10	15	15	15	13	15	15	131	14

DNF = Did not finish

== Swimming ==
Athlete	Events	Heat		Final	
Athlete	Events	Time	Rank	Time	Rank
Jamery Siga	Men's 50m Butterfly - S5	42.87	5	did not advance	
Jamery Siga	Men's 50m Freestyle - S5	38.79	6	did not advance	
Jamery Siga	Men's 100m Freestyle - S5	1:23.44	5	did not advance	

== Table Tennis ==
Men's individual

Athlete	Event	Group stage			Round 1	Quarterfinals	Semifinals	Final/BM	
Athlete	Event	Opposition Result	Opposition Result	Rank	Opposition Result	Opposition Result	Opposition Result	Opposition Result	Rank
Mohamad Azwar Bakar	Individual C10	Mateo Boheas (FRA); L 1-3	Ge Yang (CHN); L 0-3	3	did not advance				

== Wheelchair tennis ==
Malaysia qualified one competitor in the men's single event, Abu Samah Borhan. This slot came about via a Bipartite Commission Invitation place.

Athlete	Event	Round of 64	Round of 32	Round of 16	Quarterfinals	Semifinals	Final / BM	
Athlete	Event	Opposition Score	Opposition Score	Opposition Score	Opposition Score	Opposition Score	Opposition Score	Rank
Abu Samah Borhan	Men's singles	Alfie Hewett (GBR); L 0–6, 1-6	did not advance					

== See also ==
- Malaysia at the 2016 Summer Olympics
