= Weightlifting at the Summer Paralympics =

- Events: 5 (men)

Games
- 1960; 1964; 1968; 1972; 1976; 1980; 1984; 1988; 1992; 1996; 2000; 2004; 2008; 2012; 2016; 2020; 2024
- Medalists

Weightlifting at the Summer Paralympics was introduced at the 1964 Games. Starting with the 1984 Games, separate competitions were held in the sports of weightlifting and powerlifting. Weightlifting made its final appearance at the 1992 Games, after which only powerlifting competitions were held.

== Summary ==
Games	Year	Events	Best Nation
1			
2	1964	4	Great Britain
3	1968	4	Great Britain / France
4	1972	6	France
5	1976	6	United States
6	1980	11	Sweden
7	1984	15	Sweden
8	1988	7	Poland
9	1992	5	United States
10			
11			
12			
13			
14			
15			
16			

== See also ==
- Weightlifting at the Summer Olympics
- Powerlifting at the Summer Paralympics
