= Weightlifting at the 1980 Summer Paralympics – Men's -51 kg paraplegic =

Men's -51 kg paraplegic at the VI Paralympic Games
- Paralympic Weightlifting
- Competitors: 8 from 7 nations

Medalists
1st place, gold medalist(s)		Shmuel Haimovitz	Israel
2nd place, silver medalist(s)		Eugeniusz Skarupa	Poland
3rd place, bronze medalist(s)		Jean-Michel Barberane	France

The Men's light-featherweight -51 kg paraplegic was an event in weightlifting at the 1980 Summer Paralympics, for paraplegic athletes. Israel's Shmuel Haimovitz recorded a lift of 162.5 kg to win gold.

== Results ==
Place	Name	Result (kg)
1	Shmuel Haimovitz (ISR)	162.5
2	Eugeniusz Skarupa (POL)	152
3	Jean-Michel Barberane (FRA)	150
4	Abdel H. Said (EGY)	150
5	S. T. Bulik (POL)	145
6	C. Wood (GBR)	122.5
7	Train Tuong Lien (NOR)	115
8	J. Martin (USA)	115

== See also ==
- Weightlifting at the 1980 Summer Paralympics
