= Charles Roedelbronn =

American paralympic weightlifter

Personal information
- Born: 1960 or 1961 (age 65–66)
- Weight: 140 lb (64 kg) (Note: Roedelbronn weighed about 140 pounds in 1981)

Sport
- Country: United States
- Sport: Weightlifting
Medal record
Representing United States
Paralympic Games
Weightlifting
Silver medal – second place	1980 Arnhem	Men's lightweight
Gold medal – first place	1984 Stoke Mandeville / New York	Men's -75 kg paraplegic
Gold medal – first place	1988 Seoul	Men's -75 kg
Gold medal – first place	1992 Barcelona	Men's -75 kg

Charles Roedelbronn (born 1960/1961) (Note: Roedelbronn was 16 years old in 1977) is an American paralympic weightlifter. He competed at the 1980, 1984, 1988 and 1992 Summer Paralympics.

== Life and career ==
Roedelbronn was born with spina bifida. At the age of eleven, he was taught to lift weights by his father, which brought him to his weightlifting career. He graduated from East Brunswick High School in 1978.

Roedelbronn won three gold medals and a silver medal at four Paralympic Games, competing in weightlifting.
