= Powerlifting at the 2008 Summer Paralympics – Men's +100 kg =

Powerlifting - Men's +100 kg at the XIII Paralympic Games
- Venue: Beihang University Gymnasium
- Date: 16 September 2008
- Competitors: 10 from 10 nations

Medalists
| 1st place, gold medalist(s) | | Kazem Rajabi | Iran |
| 2nd place, silver medalist(s) | | Darren Gardiner | Australia |
| 3rd place, bronze medalist(s) | | Li Bing | China |

The men's +100 kg powerlifting event at the 2008 Summer Paralympics was contested on 16 September at the Beihang University Gymnasium in Beijing, China. This event was the heaviest of the men's powerlifting weight classes, allowing competitors with over 100 kilograms (220.5 lb) of body mass.

As with all Paralympic powerlifting events, lifters competed in the bench press. Each athlete was allowed three attempts to bench press as much weight as possible. Athletes attempting to break a record were allowed a fourth attempt. For the attempt to be valid, the competitor must have lowered the weighted bar to his chest, held it motionless for a moment, then pressed the bar upwards until his arms were fully extended. If the competitor failed to meet these requirements or any other rule infraction was committed, the attempt was declared invalid by a team of three referees and the result struck from the record.

== Results ==
| Rank | Name | Body weight (kg) | Attempts (kg) | | | | Result (kg) |
| Rank | Name | Body weight (kg) | 1 | 2 | 3 | 4 | Result (kg) |
|---|---|---|---|---|---|---|---|
| 1st place, gold medalist(s) | Kazem Rajabi (IRI) | 134.54 | 245.0 PR | 257.5 WR | ~~265.0~~ | 265.0 WR | 265.0 |
| 2nd place, silver medalist(s) | Darren Gardiner (AUS) | 119.35 | 225.0 | 230.0 | ~~232.5~~ | – | 230.0 |
| 3rd place, bronze medalist(s) | Li Bing (CHN) | 107.10 | 225.0 | ~~230.0~~ | ~~230.0~~ | – | 225.0 |
| 4 | Huang Kuo-Tai (TPE) | 120.78 | 225.0 | ~~230.0~~ | ~~232.5~~ | – | 225.0 |
| 5 | Mario Hochberg (GER) | 108.36 | 205.0 | 210.0 | ~~212.5~~ | – | 210.0 |
| 6 | Nikolay Marfin (RUS) | 124.17 | 195.0 | 202.5 | 207.5 | – | 207.5 |
| 7 | Maharram Aliyev (AZE) | 137.30 | 190.0 | 200.0 | 205.0 | – | 205.0 |
| – | Csaba Szavai (HUN) | 122.41 | ~~207.5~~ | ~~207.5~~ | ~~207.5~~ | – | NMR |
| – | George Taamaru (NZL) | 144.42 | ~~227.5~~ | ~~230.0~~ | ~~235.0~~ | – | NMR |
| – | Ali Abdulla Mohamed (QAT) | 111.98 | ~~180.0~~ | ~~180.0~~ | – | – | DNF |

Key: PR=Paralympic record; WR=World record; NMR=No marks recorded; DNF=Did not finish
