= Athletics at the 2000 Summer Paralympics – Men's 200 metres T12 =

Men's 200 metres T12 at the XI Paralympic Games
- Venue: Stadium Australia
- Competitors: 18 from 16 nations
- Winning time: 22.57

Medalists
1st place, gold medalist(s)		Gabriel Potra	Portugal
2nd place, silver medalist(s)		Li Qiang	China
3rd place, bronze medalist(s)		Igor Pashchenko	Ukraine

The men's 200 metres T12 took place in Stadium Australia.

There were five heats, two semifinals and one final. The T12 is for athletes who have a visual impairment.

== Heats ==
Qualified for semifinals

=== Heat 1 ===
Rank	Athlete	Time	Notes
1	Gabriel Potra (POR)	23.67	
2	Rory Field (RSA)	24.10	
3	Ingo Geffers (GER)	24.47	

=== Heat 2 ===
Rank	Athlete	Time	Notes
1	Daniel Wozniak (POL)	23.39	
2	Hisham Mohammed (MAS)	23.78	
3	Ignacio Avila (ESP)	23.95	
4	Arthur Lewis (USA)	25.52	

=== Heat 3 ===
Rank	Athlete	Time	Notes
1	Oleg Chepel (BLR)	23.69	
2	Juan Antonio Prieto (ESP)	23.83	
3	Charam Kajornvech (THA)	24.46	
4	Shigeki Yano (JPN)	24.75	

=== Heat 4 ===
Rank	Athlete	Time	Notes
1	Igor Pashchenko (UKR)	23.49	
2	Ahmed Belhaj Ali (TUN)	23.51	
3	Matteo Tassetti (ITA)	24.74	
4	Simon Mwangi (KEN)	25.48	

=== Heat 5 ===
Rank	Athlete	Time	Notes
1	Li Qiang (CHN)	23.71	
2	Sergey Semenov (RUS)	24.71	
3	Holger Geffers (GER)	24.73	

== Semifinals ==
Qualified for final round

=== Heat 1 ===
Rank	Athlete	Time	Notes
1	Li Qiang (CHN)	22.84	
2	Daniel Wozniak (POL)	23.02	
3	Juan Antonio Prieto (ESP)	23.69	
4	Oleg Chepel (BLR)	23.74	

=== Heat 2 ===
Rank	Athlete	Time	Notes
1	Gabriel Potra (POR)	22.92	
2	Igor Pashchenko (UKR)	23.07	
3	Ahmed Belhaj Ali (TUN)	23.26	
4	Hisham Mohammed (MAS)	23.69	

== Final ==
Rank	Athlete	Time	Notes
1st place, gold medalist(s)	Gabriel Potra (POR)	22.57	
2nd place, silver medalist(s)	Li Qiang (CHN)	22.70	
3rd place, bronze medalist(s)	Igor Pashchenko (UKR)	22.80	
4	Daniel Wozniak (POL)	22.98	
