= Powerlifting at the 2004 Summer Paralympics – Men's 100 kg =

Men's Up To 100 kg at the XII Paralympic Games
- Paralympic Powerlifting
- Venue: Nikaia Olympic Weightlifting Hall
- Dates: 27 September 2004
- Competitors: 16 from 16 nations
- Winning weight(kg): 242.5

Medalists
1st place, gold medalist(s)		Kazem Rajabigolojeh	Iran
2nd place, silver medalist(s)		Solomon Amarakuo	Nigeria
3rd place, bronze medalist(s)		Li Bing	China

The Men's 100 kg powerlifting event at the 2004 Summer Paralympics was competed on 27 September. It was won by Kazem Rajabigolojeh, representing Iran.

== Final round ==
27 Sept. 2004, 13:45

Rank	Athlete	Weight(kg)	Notes
1st place, gold medalist(s)	Kazem Rajabigolojeh (IRI)	242.5	WR
2nd place, silver medalist(s)	Solomon Amarakuo (NGR)	235.0	
3rd place, bronze medalist(s)	Li Bing (CHN)	232.5	
4	Nirut Saneebutr (THA)	230.0	
5	Mohamed Hamman (EGY)	215.0	
6	Siarhei Kryvulets (BLR)	215.0	
7	Bassam Al Hawal (KSA)	195.0	
8	Sergey Istomin (RUS)	190.0	
9	Mathew Aldridge (USA)	190.0	
10	Haidarah Alkawamleh (JOR)	187.5	
11	Ahmed El Khayati (MAR)	172.5	
12	Hasan Reda Ali (IRQ)	170.0	
13	Panagiotis Dimas (GRE)	160.0	
14	Sadeq Neama (BRN)	140.0	
	Mario Hochberg (GER)	NMR	
	Ahmad Amil Usin (MAS)	NMR	
