= Noor Askuzaimey Mat Salim =

Personal information
- Born: October 6, 1985 (age 40)

Sport
- Country: Malaysia
- Sport: Boccia
- Disability class: BC4
Medal record
ASEAN Para Games
Silver medal – second place	2017 Kuala Lumpur	BC4 mixed pairs
Gold medal – first place	2023 Phnom Penh	BC4 women's individual
Asian Para Games
Gold medal – first place	2023 Hangzhou	BC4 women's individual
World Boccia Asia-Oceania Regional Championships
Gold medal – first place	2023 Hong Kong	BC4 women's individual

Noor Askuzaimey Mat Salim (born 6 October 1985) is a Malaysian boccia player. She represented Malaysia at the 2024 Summer Paralympics, where she competed in the women's individual and mixed pairs BC4 events.

== Career ==
Noor Askuzaimey began playing boccia in November 2016. In 2017, she won the silver medal in the pair event at the ASEAN Para Games in Kuala Lumpur. The following year, she two silver medals at SUKMA Perak 2018, in the individual event and the pair event.

2023 marked several successes for Noor Askuzaimey. In June she won gold in the BC4 women's individual event at the ASEAN Para Games in Phnom Penh, Cambodia. In October, at the Asian Para Games in Hangzhou, she again won gold in the BC4 women's individual, and in December she won a third gold at the 2023 World Boccia Asia-Oceania Regional Championships in Hong Kong. As of 2023, she was ranked 25th in the world. That year, she also became a member of the Paralympic Council Malaysia Athletes' Council, a position she is scheduled to keep until December 2024.

At the 2024 Summer Paralympics in Paris,Noor Askuzaimey came fourth in women's individual BC4 boccia after losing the bronze medal match to Colombian boccia player Leidy Chica. In the mixed pairs BC4 event, she and partner Abdul Rahman were eliminated from their pool and did not advance to the quarterfinals.

== Early and personal life ==
Noor Askuzaimey was born disabled, and has used a wheelchair all her life. She has two children.
