= Richard Taurer =

American former paralympic weightlifter

Sport
- Country: United States
- Sport: Weightlifting
Medal record
Representing United States
Paralympic Games
Weightlifting
Bronze medal – third place	Toronto 1976	Men's middleweight

Richard Taurer is an American former paralympic weightlifter. He competed at the 1976 Summer Paralympics, winning the bronze medal in the men's middleweight weightlifting event. He also competed in the men's discus throw 3 event, finishing 10th.
