= Athletics at the 2000 Summer Paralympics – Men's 100 metres T12 =

Men's 100 metres T12 at the XI Paralympic Games
- Venue: Stadium Australia
- Competitors: 20 from 16 nations

Medalists
1st place, gold medalist(s)		Li Qiang	China
2nd place, silver medalist(s)		Igor Pashchenko	Ukraine
3rd place, bronze medalist(s)		Gabriel Potra	Portugal

The Men's 100 metres T12 event for the 2000 Summer Paralympics took place at the Stadium Australia.

The T12 category is for athletes with a visual impairment. Athletes in this category will generally have some residual sight, the ability to recognise the shape of a hand at a distance of 2 metres and the ability to perceive clearly will be no more than 2/60. T12 athletes commonly run with guides.

== Results ==
=== Round 1 ===
Athletes qualified for the semi-final if they won their heat or achieved one of the 2 fastest other times.

==== Heat 1 ====
Rank	Athlete	Country	Time	Notes
1	Gabriel Potra	Portugal	11.53	Q
2	Juan Antonio Prieto	Spain	11.63	q
3	Ingo Geffers	Germany	12.16	

==== Heat 2 ====
Rank	Athlete	Country	Time	Notes
1	Rory Field	South Africa	11.73	Q
2	Shigeki Yano	Japan	11.73	q
3	Holger Geffers	Germany	12.19	

==== Heat 3 ====
Rank	Athlete	Country	Time	Notes
1	Li Qiang	China	11.60	Q
2	Chararn Kajornvech	Thailand	11.78	
3	Miroslaw Pych	Poland	DNF	

==== Heat 4 ====
Rank	Athlete	Country	Time	Notes
1	Hisham Mohammed	Malaysia	11.65	Q
2	Sergey Semenov	Russia	11.74	
3	Koichi Takada	Japan	12.06	
4	Ignacio Avila	Spain	DNF	

==== Heat 5 ====
Rank	Athlete	Country	Time	Notes
1	Ahmed Belhaj Ali	Tunisia	11.36	Q
2	Matteo Tassetti	Italy	11.80	
3	Bil Marinkovic	Austria	12.08	

==== Heat 6 ====
Rank	Athlete	Country	Time	Notes
1	Igor Pashchenko	Ukraine	11.50	Q
2	Fuata Faktaufon	Fiji	11.90	
3	Arthur Lewis	United States	11.96	
4	Daniel Wozniak	Poland	DNF	

=== Semi-finals ===
Athletes qualified for the final if they won their race, or achieved one of the next 2 fastest times.

==== Heat 1 ====
Rank	Athlete	Country	Time	Notes
1	Ahmed Belhaj Ali	Tunisia	11.28	Q
2	Li Qiang	China	11.42	q
3	Hisham Mohammed	Malaysia	11.70	
4	Shigeki Yano	Japan	11.85	

==== Heat 2 ====
Rank	Athlete	Country	Time	Notes
1	Igor Pashchenko	Ukraine	11.28	Q
2	Gabriel Potra	Portugal	11.30	q
3	Rory Field	South Africa	11.54	
4	Juan Antonio Prieto	Spain	11.58	

=== Final ===
Rank	Athlete	Country	Time	Notes
1st place, gold medalist(s)	Li Qiang	China	11.27	
2nd place, silver medalist(s)	Igor Pashchenko	Ukraine	11.34	
3rd place, bronze medalist(s)	Gabriel Potra	Portugal	11.38	
4	Ahmed Belhaj Ali	Tunisia	11.44	
