= Malaysia at the 1972 Summer Paralympics =

- IPC code: MAS
- NPC: Malaysian Paralympic Council
- Website: www.paralympic.org.my (in English)

in Heidelberg
- Competitors: 4 in 2 sports
- Medals: Gold 0 Silver 0 Bronze 0 Total 0

Summer Paralympics appearances (overview)
- 1972; 1976–1984; 1988; 1992; 1996; 2000; 2004; 2008; 2012; 2016; 2020; 2024

Malaysia sent a delegation to compete at the 1972 Summer Paralympics in Heidelberg, West Germany from 2 August to 11 August. This marked the first time the country has participated in the Paralympic Games as a whole. They sent four competitors to these games, all of which were male athletes. The country did not win a medal at these games.

== Disability classifications ==
Athletes at the Paralympics in 1972 were all afflicted by spinal cord injuries and required the use of a wheelchair. This is in contrast to later Paralympics that include events for participants that fit into any of five different disability categories; amputation, either congenital or sustained through injury or illness; cerebral palsy; wheelchair athletes; visual impairment, including blindness; Les autres, any physical disability that does not fall strictly under one of the other categories, for example dwarfism or multiple sclerosis. Each Paralympic sport then has its own classifications, dependent upon the specific physical demands of competition. Events are given a code, made of numbers and letters, describing the type of event and classification of the athletes competing.

== Sports ==
=== Athletics ===
==== Men's track events ====
Athlete	Events	Heat		Final	
Athlete	Events	Time	Rank	Time	Rank
Amin Alwee	100 m 4	34.00	40	Did not advance	
Ismail Salleh	100 m 4	30.80	38	Did not advance	

==== Men's field events ====
Athlete	Events	Final	Rank
Amin Alwee	Shot put 4	3.89	39
Dulau Simon Ansim	Discus throw B1	22.68	7
Dulau Simon Ansim	Shot put B1	8.94	5
Ismail Salleh	Javelin 4	14.24	26
Taisen Sen Chan	Javelin 4	13.21	31
Taisen Sen Chan	Shot put 4	4.46	34

=== Weightlifting ===
Athlete	Event	Result	Rank
Amin Alwee	Men's featherweight	67.5	7
Ismail Salleh	Men's light featherweight	90.0	7
Taisen Sen Chan	Men's light featherweight	90.0	6

== See also ==
- Malaysia at the 1972 Summer Olympics
- Malaysia at the Paralympics
