= Swimming at the 2004 Summer Paralympics – Women's 100 metre breaststroke SB7 =

Women's 100m Breaststroke SB7 at the XII Paralympic Games
- Paralympic Swimming
- Venue: Olympic Aquatic Centre
- Dates: 21 September 2004
- Competitors: 11 from 9 nations
- Winning time: 1:38.66

Medalists
1st place, gold medalist(s)		Erin Popovich	United States
2nd place, silver medalist(s)		Kristin Hakonardottir	Iceland
3rd place, bronze medalist(s)		Huang Min	China

The Women's 100 metre breaststroke SB7 swimming event at the 2004 Summer Paralympics was competed on 21 September. It was won by Erin Popovich, representing United States.

== 1st round ==
Qualified for final round

Heat 1

21 Sept. 2004, morning session

Rank	Athlete	Time	Notes
1	Huang Min (CHN)	1:43.23	
2	Dianne Saunders (AUS)	1:46.10	
3	Stacey Williams (AUS)	1:49.82	
4	Yang Libo (CHN)	1:52.44	
5	Polina Dzhurova (BUL)	2:05.36	

Heat 2

21 Sept. 2004, morning session

Rank	Athlete	Time	Notes
1	Kristin Hakonardottir (ISL)	1:39.26	
2	Erin Popovich (USA)	1:39.89	
3	Timea Poprocsi (HUN)	1:47.70	
4	Magdalena Jaroslawska (POL)	1:54.14	
5	Nathalie Suter (SUI)	1:56.33	
6	Matia Baun Seling (MAS)	2:08.35	

== Final round ==
21 Sept. 2004, evening session

Rank	Athlete	Time	Notes
1st place, gold medalist(s)	Erin Popovich (USA)	1:38.66	
2nd place, silver medalist(s)	Kristin Hakonardottir (ISL)	1:38.84	
3rd place, bronze medalist(s)	Huang Min (CHN)	1:39.51	
4	Dianne Saunders (AUS)	1:44.99	
5	Timea Poprocsi (HUN)	1:47.01	
6	Stacey Williams (AUS)	1:50.84	
7	Magdalena Jaroslawska (POL)	1:53.09	
	Yang Libo (CHN)	DSQ	
