= Weightlifting at the 1984 Summer Paralympics =

Weightlifting at the VII Paralympic Games
- Paralympic Weightlifting
- Competitors: 71 from 20 nations

Paralympic symbol (1988-1994)

Weightlifting at the 1984 Summer Paralympics consisted of fourteen events for men.

== Participating nations ==
There were 71 male competitors representing 20 nations.

- Australia (1)
- Belgium (2)
- Canada (2)
- Ecuador (1)
- Egypt (5)
- Finland (3)
- France (10)
- Great Britain (9)
- Guatemala (2)
- Israel (2)
- Jordan (3)
- South Korea (1)
- Kuwait (3)
- Luxembourg (1)
- Mexico (3)
- Poland (2)
- Sweden (7)
- Switzerland (2)
- Trinidad and Tobago (2)
- United States (10)

== Medal summary ==
=== Medal table ===
There were 40 medal winners representing 13 nations.

Rank	Nation	Gold	Silver	Bronze	Total
1	Sweden (SWE)	5	0	1	6
2	France (FRA)	2	5	1	8
3	Finland (FIN)	2	1	0	3
4	Israel (ISR)	2	0	0	2
4	Poland (POL)	2	0	0	2
6	Great Britain (GBR)	1	3	2	6
7	United States (USA)	1	2	2	5
8	Belgium (BEL)	0	1	1	2
8	Switzerland (SUI)	0	1	1	2
10	Australia (AUS)	0	0	1	1
10	Luxembourg (LUX)	0	0	1	1
10	Mexico (MEX)	0	0	1	1
10	South Korea (KOR)	0	0	1	1
Totals (13 entries)		15	13	12	40

=== Men's events ===
Event	Gold		Silver		Bronze	
Men's -51 kg integrated	Nils-Ake Lindahl; Sweden	107.5	Herve Paillet; France	105.0	Keum-Jong Jung; South Korea	100.0
Men's -51 kg paraplegic	Shmuel Haimovitz; Israel	152.5	J. M. Barberane; France	150.0	M. Knutson; United States	137.5
Men's -57 kg integrated	Timo Palonen; Finland	130.0	Veikko Vaananen; Finland	125.0	—	
Men's -57 kg paraplegic	Brian Stones; Great Britain	142.5	C. Wood; Great Britain	120.0	—	
Men's -65 kg integrated	Raimo Aalto; Finland	140.0	Patrick Garnier; France	130.0	Alper Ali; Great Britain	100.0
Men's -65 kg paraplegic	Ryszard Fornalczyk; Poland	172.5	Pietro Valsangiacomo; Switzerland	170.0	Dominique Hainault; France	160.0
Men's -75 kg integrated	Kurt Henningsson; Sweden	152.0	Donald Deutsch; United States	142.0	Marcel Kockelmann; Luxembourg	100.0
Men's -75 kg paraplegic	Jean Grandsire; France Charles Roedelbronn; United States	192.5	—		Carl Muylle; Belgium Brian McNicholl; Australia	170.0
Men's -85 kg integrated	Bernard Barberet; France	185.0	Theo Decicco; Belgium	180.0	Fred McKenzie; Great Britain	142.5
Men's -85 kg paraplegic	Abraham Strauch; Israel	217.5	Gerard Houdmond; France	200.0	Mitchell Strickland; United States	182.5
Men's -95 kg integrated	Arne Karlsson; Sweden	175.0	Anthony Bishop; Great Britain	147.5	—	
Men's -95 kg paraplegic	Ryszard Tomaszewski; Poland	222.5	R. Rowe; Great Britain	182.5	Víctor Valdez; Mexico	180.0
Men's +95 kg integrated	Stanislaw Rogowski; Sweden	180.0	David Bowers; United States	172.5	Nils Karreberg; Sweden	155.0
Men's +95 kg paraplegic	Bengt Lindberg; Sweden	275.0	N. Clemente; France	210.0	Alfredo Battistini; Switzerland	195.0
