= Juan Carlos Prieto =

Spanish Paralympic athlete

Medal record

Paralympic athletics

Representing Spain

Paralympic Games
Silver medal – second place	1992 Barcelona	High Jump - B2

Juan Carlos Prieto is a paralympic athlete from Spain, competing mainly in category B2 events.

Prieto competed in the 1992 Summer Paralympics in his home country of Spain. He competed in the 800m, 1500m and long jump and won a silver medal in the high jump.
