= Reuben Ngata =

New Zealand paralympian

Personal information
- Nationality: New Zealander
- Born: 31 October 1936 (age 89) Tikitiki, New Zealand

Sport
- Sport: Athletics; Table tennis Weightlifting
Medal record
Men's weightlifting
Representing New Zealand
Paralympic Games
Bronze medal – third place	1976 Toronto	Lightweight

Reuben Ngata (born 31 October 1936) is a former New Zealand Paralympic athlete of Ngāti Porou descent. In 1961, he became diagnosed with Polio. In the 1968 Summer Paralympics he competed in athletics. In the 1976 Summer Paralympics he competed in athletics, table tennis and weightlifting, winning a bronze medal in the Weightlifting in men's lightweight.

He would later take up boccia after the Toronto Games.
