= Shmuel Haimovitz =

Israeli Paralympic competitor

Personal information
- Native name: שמואל חיימוביץ
- Born: 9 March 1953
- Died: 30 August 2017 (aged 64)

Sport
- Country: Israel
- Sport: Weightlifting
Medal record
Event / 1st / 2nd / 3rd; Paralympic Games / 3 / 0 / 2
Representing Israel
Paralympic Games
Gold medal – first place	1976 Toronto	Light-Featherweight
Gold medal – first place	1980 Arnhem	Light-Featherweight -51 kg Paraplegic
Gold medal – first place	1984 Stoke Mandeville	-51 kg Paraplegic
Bronze medal – third place	1972 Heidelberg	Featherweight
Bronze medal – third place	1988 Seoul	-51 kg

Shmuel Haimovitz (Hebrew: שמואל חיימוביץ) was an Israeli weightlifter who won five Paralympic medals and set several world records. From 2001 to his death in 2017 was the commissioner for equal rights for people with disabilities in Israel.

== Career ==
Haimovitz was injured in a car accident at the age of six and was a wheelchair user. Since 1965 he was active in sports at the Israel Sports Center for the Disabled.

At the 1972 Summer Paralympics, he competed in the featherweight category and won his first bronze medal, pushing 127.5 kg.

At the 1976 Summer Paralympics, he competed in the light-featherweight classification and won the gold medal, pushing 142.5 kg. He also took part in the wheelchair slalom race, but came last and was ranked 23rd.

At the 1980 Summer Paralympics, he won his second gold medal, pushing 162.5 kg.

At the 1984 Summer Paralympics, he won his third gold medal, pushing 152.5 kg.

At the 1988 Summer Paralympics, he won a bronze medal, pushing 150 kg.

His final appearance at the Paralympic Games was at the 1992 Summer Paralympics was unsuccessful, ranking seventh, alongside Israeli competitor Amos Ginosar who won the gold medal.

Haimovitz was an architect and from 2001 to his death in 2017 was the commissioner for equal rights for people with disabilities at the Ministry of Justice. He lived at Elkana.
