= Fred Creba =

New Zealand Paralympic weightlifter

Personal information
- Full name: Frederick George Creba
- Nationality: New Zealander
- Born: 1945 Waimate, New Zealand
- Died: 27 October 2013 (aged 67–68) Waimate, New Zealand

Sport
- Sport: Athletics; Weightlifting
Medal record
Men's weightlifting
Representing New Zealand
Paralympic Games
Bronze medal – third place	1976 Toronto	Light heavyweight

Frederick George (Fred) Creba (1945–2013) was a New Zealand Paralympic sportsperson. In the 1976 Summer Paralympics he competed in athletics and weightlifting, winning a bronze medal in the Weightlifting in men's light heavy weight, despite being from a town of only 3 thousand.

Creba died in 2013 when he was 68 years old. In 1975, his sporting performances, including setting a world record in weightlifting, earned him the title of South Canterbury Sportsperson of the Year, the first disabled person to do so.

Fred Creba trained in the Toc - H gym, made up of a set of equipment in a small garage. He would practice discus throw by going out with his father and sometimes his nephew and take one throw his father would then go and retrieve and start over. Freddy's wit and toughness enabled him to a Paralympic bronze medal.
