= Li Bing (powerlifter) =

Chinese Paralympic powerlifter

Sport
- Country: China
- Sport: Paralympic powerlifting
Medal record
Paralympic Games
Bronze medal – third place	2004 Athens	100 kg
Bronze medal – third place	2008 Beijing	+100 kg

Li Bing is a Chinese Paralympic powerlifter. He represented China at the 2004 Summer Paralympics held in Athens, Greece and at the 2008 Summer Paralympics held in Beijing, China and he won two medals: the bronze medal in the men's 100 kg event in 2004 and the bronze medal in the men's +100 kg event in 2008.
