= Swimming at the 2004 Summer Paralympics – Men's 150 metre individual medley SM4 =

Men's 150m Individual Medley SM4 at the XII Paralympic Games
- Paralympic Swimming
- Venue: Olympic Aquatic Centre
- Dates: 26 September 2004
- Competitors: 14 from 11 nations
- Winning time: 2:39.15

Medalists
1st place, gold medalist(s)		Clodoaldo Silva	Brazil
2nd place, silver medalist(s)		Javier Torres	Spain
3rd place, bronze medalist(s)		Sebastian Facundo Ramirez	Argentina

The Men's 150 metre individual medley SM4 swimming event at the 2004 Summer Paralympics was competed on 26 September. It was won by Clodoaldo Silva, representing Brazil.

== 1st round ==
Qualified for final round

Heat 1

26 Sept. 2004, morning session

Rank	Athlete	Time	Notes
1	Clodoaldo Silva (BRA)	2:41.73	
2	Sanit Songnork (THA)	2:47.35	
3	Sebastian Facundo Ramirez (ARG)	2:51.76	
4	Takayuki Suzuki (JPN)	2:57.71	
5	Chee Kin Wong (MAS)	3:00.13	
6	Thomas Rosenberger (AUT)	3:06.49	
7	Moises Batista (BRA)	3:09.61	

Heat 2

26 Sept. 2004, morning session

Rank	Athlete	Time	Notes
1	Javier Torres (ESP)	2:44.97	
2	Krzyzstof Sleczka (POL)	2:46.27	
3	Miguel Luque (ESP)	2:51.59	
4	Zeng Hua Bin (CHN)	3:03.21	
5	Jan Povysil (CZE)	3:04.57	
6	Hiroshi Karube (JPN)	3:14.88	
	Kestutis Skucas (LTU)	DNS	

== Final round ==
26 Sept. 2004, evening session

Rank	Athlete	Time	Notes
1st place, gold medalist(s)	Clodoaldo Silva (BRA)	2:39.15	
2nd place, silver medalist(s)	Javier Torres (ESP)	2:40.94	
3rd place, bronze medalist(s)	Sebastian Facundo Ramirez (ARG)	2:42.57	
4	Krzyzstof Sleczka (POL)	2:47.01	
5	Miguel Luque (ESP)	2:48.66	
6	Sebastian Facundo Ramirez (ARG)	2:56.15	
7	Chee Kin Wong (MAS)	2:56.80	
8	Takayuki Suzuki (JPN)	2:58.61	
