= Abraham Strauch =

Israeli paralympic athlete

Personal information
- Native name: אברהם שטראוך

Sport
- Country: Israel
- Sport: Weightlifting
Medal record
Event / 1st / 2nd / 3rd; Paralympic Games / 4 / 1 / 0
Representing Israel
Paralympic Games
| Gold medal – first place | 1976 Toronto | Men's Light-Heavyweight |
| Gold medal – first place | 1980 Arnhem | Men's Light-Heavyweight |
| Gold medal – first place | 1984 Stoke Mandeville | Men's -85 kg Paraplegic |
| Gold medal – first place | 1988 Seoul | Men's -95 kg |
| Silver medal – second place | 1992 Barcelona | Men's -90 kg |

Abraham (Avi) Strauch (Hebrew: אברהם (אבי) שטראוך) is an Israeli former weightlifter who won five Paralympic medals and set several world records.

== Career ==
Since 1975 and for more than a decade, he was world champion in light-heavyweight up to 85 kg.

At the 1976 Summer Paralympics, he competed in the light-heavyweight classification and won the gold medal, pushing 207.5 kg and setting a new world record in his category.

At the 1980 Summer Paralympics, he won his second gold medal, pushing 230 kg and setting a new world record and paralympic record.

At the 1984 Summer Paralympics, he won his third gold medal, pushing 217 kg.

At the 1988 Summer Paralympics, he won his fourth gold medal, pushing 200 kg on his first attempt, while injuring his shoulder.

At the 1992 Summer Paralympics, he won his final paralympic medal, achieving a silver medal.

Strauch was active in the Israel Sports Center for the Disabled. He lived in kibbutz Ga'ash and married in 1985.
