= Igor Pashchenko =

Ukrainian Paralympic athlete

Medal record

Paralympic athletics

Representing Ukraine

Paralympic Games
Silver medal – second place	2000 Sydney	100 metres - T12
Bronze medal – third place	2000 Sydney	200 metres - T12

Igor Pashchenko is a paralympic athlete from Ukraine competing mainly in category T12 sprint events.

Igor Competed in the 100m and 200m at both the 2000 and 2004 Summer Paralympics winning the 100m bronze and silver in the 200m at the 2000 games, but unable to win any medals in 2004.
