= Powerlifting at the 2004 Summer Paralympics – Women's 56 kg =

Women's Up To 56 kg at the XII Paralympic Games
- Paralympic Powerlifting
- Venue: Nikaia Olympic Weightlifting Hall
- Dates: 21 September 2004
- Competitors: 8 from 8 nations
- Winning weight(kg): 127.5

Medalists
| 1st place, gold medalist(s) | | Fatma Omar | Egypt |
| 2nd place, silver medalist(s) | | Aghimile Patience Igbiti | Nigeria |
| 3rd place, bronze medalist(s) | | Huo Zhenling | China |

The Women's 56 kg powerlifting event at the 2004 Summer Paralympics was competed on 21 September. It was won by Fatma Omar, representing Egypt.

== Final round ==
21 Sept. 2004, 14:30

| Rank | Athlete | Weight(kg) | Notes |
|---|---|---|---|
| 1st place, gold medalist(s) | Fatma Omar (EGY) | 127.5 | WR |
| 2nd place, silver medalist(s) | Aghimile Patience Igbiti (NGR) | 122.5 | |
| 3rd place, bronze medalist(s) | Huo Zhenling (CHN) | 112.5 | |
| 4 | Natalie Blake (GBR) | 87.5 | |
| 5 | Moekie Grobbelaar (RSA) | 87.5 | |
| 6 | Arawan Bootpo (THA) | 85.0 | |
| 7 | Lin Ya Hsuan (TPE) | 77.5 | |
| 8 | Maria Bartosova (SVK) | 77.5 | |
