= Powerlifting at the 2004 Summer Paralympics – Men's 75 kg =

Men's Up To 75 kg at the XII Paralympic Games
- Paralympic Powerlifting
- Venue: Nikaia Olympic Weightlifting Hall
- Dates: 25 September 2004
- Competitors: 16 from 16 nations
- Winning weight(kg): 225.0

Medalists
1st place, gold medalist(s)		Zhang Hai Dong	China
2nd place, silver medalist(s)		El Sayed Abd El Aal	Egypt
3rd place, bronze medalist(s)		Reza Boromand Gharehlar	Iran

The Men's 75 kg powerlifting event at the 2004 Summer Paralympics was competed on 25 September. It was won by Zhang Hai Dong, representing China.

== Final round ==
25 Sept. 2004, 17:15

Rank	Athlete	Weight(kg)	Notes
1st place, gold medalist(s)	Zhang Hai Dong (CHN)	225.0	
2nd place, silver medalist(s)	El Sayed Abd El Aal (EGY)	210.0	
3rd place, bronze medalist(s)	Reza Boromand Gharehlar (IRI)	195.0	
4	Ryszard Fornalczyk (POL)	192.5	
5	Ammar Cheikh Ahmad (SYR)	190.0	
6	Okechukwu Alfa (NGR)	190.0	
7	Hussein Al Hejji (KSA)	187.5	
8	Bong Duk Hwan (KOR)	187.5	
9	Vadim Rakitin (RUS)	180.0	
10	Ovezgeldy Orjiyev (TKM)	170.0	
11	Jose Marino (ECU)	162.5	
12	Mohd Yuspi Md Dali (MAS)	157.5	
13	Dmitrijus Archipovas (LTU)	150.0	
14	Spas Spasov (BUL)	150.0	
	Juan Chavez (PER)	NMR	
	Yusup Kadyrov (UZB)	NMR	
