= Powerlifting at the 2004 Summer Paralympics – Women's 75 kg =

Women's Up To 75 kg at the XII Paralympic Games
- Paralympic Powerlifting
- Venue: Nikaia Olympic Weightlifting Hall
- Dates: 25 September 2004
- Competitors: 8 from 8 nations
- Winning weight(kg): 137.5

Medalists
1st place, gold medalist(s)		Lin Tzu-hui	Chinese Taipei
2nd place, silver medalist(s)		Zhu Mingxia	China
3rd place, bronze medalist(s)		Kike Adedeji Ogunbamowo	Nigeria

The Women's 75 kg powerlifting event at the 2004 Summer Paralympics was competed on 25 September. It was won by Lin Tzu Hui, representing Chinese Taipei.

== Final round ==
25 Sept. 2004, 13:00

Rank	Athlete	Weight(kg)	Notes
1st place, gold medalist(s)	Lin Tzu-hui (TPE)	137.5	
2nd place, silver medalist(s)	Zhu Mingxia (CHN)	132.5	
3rd place, bronze medalist(s)	Kike Adedeji Ogunbamowo (NGR)	120.0	
4	Fatimah Wagiman (MAS)	107.5	
5	Olga Kisseleva (RUS)	100.0	
6	Sahar Elgnemi (LBA)	80.0	
	Lyubov Semenyuk (UKR)	NMR	
	Perla Barcenas Ponce de Leon (MEX)	NMR	
