= Akihito Motohashi =

Japanese Paralympic athlete

Medal record

Paralympic athletics

Representing Japan

Paralympic Games
| Bronze medal – third place | 1992 Barcelona | High Jump – B2 |

Akihito Motohashi (本橋 昭人, Motohashi Akihito) is a Japanese former paralympic athlete and cyclist.

== Sporting career ==
At the age of 21, Motohashi was diagnosed as having atrophy of the optic nerve.

He has subsequently competed at three paralympics in two different sports. He first competed in the 1992 Summer Paralympics, where he ran in the marathon, finishing in 6th place, and won a bronze medal in the high jump. In the 1996 Summer Paralympics, Motohashi competed in the marathon only. In the 2000 Summer Paralympics, he moved over to cycling, but failed to win any medals despite competing in four different events.

== Teaching career ==
From 1996, Motohashi worked as an assistant teacher at the Yamagata School for the Blind. From 2003, he became a psychotherapy instructor, teaching techniques such as acupuncture and massage.

== Arrest for assault ==
In the early hours of 15 April 2008, Motohashi was arrested for assault after punching a restaurant worker in the face in Yamagata while under the influence of alcohol.
