= Irina Kazantseva =

Russian Paralympic powerlifter

Sport
- Country: Russia
- Sport: Paralympic powerlifting
Medal record
Paralympic Games
Silver medal – second place	2008 Beijing	56 kg

Irina Kazantseva is a Russian Paralympic powerlifter. She represented Russia at the 2008 Summer Paralympics and at the 2012 Summer Paralympics and she won the silver medal in the women's 56 kg event in 2008.

At the 2019 World Para Powerlifting Championships held in Nur-Sultan, Kazakhstan, she competed in the women's 61 kg event without winning a medal.
