= Fatma Omar =

Egyptian powerlifter (born 1973)

Personal information
- Nationality: Egyptian
- Born: 17 November 1973 (age 52) Cairo, Egypt
- Height: 145 cm (57 in)

Sport
- Country: Egypt
- Sport: Powerlifting
- Event: 56kg
Medal record
Women's powerlifting
Representing Egypt
Paralympic Games
Gold medal – first place	2000 Sydney	−44 kg
Gold medal – first place	2004 Athens	−56 kg
Gold medal – first place	2008 Beijing	−56 kg
Gold medal – first place	2012 London	−56 kg
Silver medal – second place	2016 Rio de Janeiro	−61 kg
IPC World Championships
Gold medal – first place	1998 Dubai	−44 kg
Gold medal – first place	2002 Kuala Lumpur	−44 kg
Gold medal – first place	2006 Busan	−56 kg
Gold medal – first place	2014 Dubai	−61 kg
Bronze medal – third place	2021 Tbilisi	−67 kg

Fatma Omar (born 17 November 1973) is an Egyptian powerlifter competing in the -56 kg category. She is a dominant power in her sport, winning gold in her event in four Summer Paralympics, and another four gold medals at the IPC Powerlifting World Championships.

== Personal history ==
Omar was born in Cairo, Egypt in 1973. At the age of one she was contracted polio, which resulted in spinal damage. She has two daughters.

== Powerlifting career ==
Omar first represented her country at the 1998 IPC Powerlifting World Championships, held in Dubai. She entered one of the lowest weight categories, the 44 kg, winning the gold medal. Following this success she was selected to compete at the 2000 Summer Paralympics in Sydney, Australia. At the Sydney Games she competed in the 44 kg weight class taking the gold medal with a lift of 109 kg, beating Lucy Ogechukwu Ejike of Nigeria. Four years later at the Athens Games, Omar moved up to the 56 kg class. She outclassed the field with a lift of 127.5 kg.

At the 2008 Beijing Games, Omar again competed at the 56 kg level. She broke the world record with a winning lift of 141.5 kg.

After her win in Beijing, Nigeria's Lucy Ejike stated that she would move up to Omar's weight division to challenge for the 56 kg weight class. This led to a showdown at the 2012 Summer Paralympics in London with her rival from Athens. Ejike took the lead in the first round with a lift of 135 kg but she was unable to better this attempt, while Omar improved her record from Beijing with a final lift of 142 kg taking her fourth gold medal.

Four years later Ejike and Omar met for the third time at a Paralympic Games, when thy both entered the 2016 Games in Rio. After London the International Paralympic Committee changed the powerlifting weight categories for both men and women, and the two competed in the women's 61 kg division. The year previous Mexico's Amalia Perez had set a world record in the 61 kg with a lift of 133 kg, which Ejike surpassed with her first lift of 135 kg. Omar had failed at 133 kg on her first lift, but was successful at the same weight on her second attempt. Ejike improved her lead with her second lift, setting her second world record of the day with a weight of 138 kg. Omar responded with a final lift of 140 kg, putting Ejike into silver medal place. Unfortunately for Omar, Ejike lifted 142 kg to leave Omar with the silver medal for the first time in her Paralympic career.

She won the bronze medal in her event at the 2021 World Para Powerlifting Championships held in Tbilisi, Georgia.
