= Nurul Suhada Zainal =

Personal information
- Full name: Nurul Suhada binti Zainal
- Born: 10 September 1993 (age 33) Banting, Selangor
- Height: 1.59 m (5 ft 3 in)

Cycling career
- Sport: Cycling
- Disciplines: Road; Track; Para-cycling
- Role: Rider sighted pilot

Major wins
- One-day races and Classics National Road Race Championships (2015)
Medal record
Women's Road bicycle race
Representing Malaysia
Southeast Asian Games
| Bronze medal – third place | 2015 Singapore | Road race |
Women's Para-cycling
Representing Malaysia
ASEAN Para Games
| Gold medal – first place | 2017 Kuala Lumpur | B Sprint |
| Gold medal – first place | 2017 Kuala Lumpur | B kilometre |
| Gold medal – first place | 2017 Kuala Lumpur | B 3000 m individual pursuit |
| Gold medal – first place | 2017 Kuala Lumpur | B Road race |
| Silver medal – second place | 2017 Kuala Lumpur | B Time trial |
Asian Para Games
| Gold medal – first place | 2017 Jakarta | B Road race |
| Gold medal – first place | 2017 Jakarta | B 3000 m individual pursuit |
| Gold medal – first place | 2017 Jakarta | B Kilometre |
| Silver medal – second place | 2017 Jakarta | B Time trial |
Asian Para Cycling Championships
| Gold medal – first place | 2019 Jakarta | B Sprint |
| Gold medal – first place | 2019 Jakarta | B Individual pursuit |
| Gold medal – first place | 2019 Jakarta | B Time trial |

Nurul Suhada Zainal (born 10 September 1993) is a Malaysian cyclist. She was also a sighted pilot for Malaysian para-cycling athletes. With Nur Azlia Syafinaz Mohd Zais, they competed in 2020 Paralympic Games held in Tokyo.

== Major results ==
=== Road ===
2013
National Road Championships

3rd Time Trial

2015
National Road Championships

1st Road Race

Southeast Asian Games

3rdd Road Race

2016
National Road Championships

2nd Road Race
