= Amos Ginosar =

Israeli weightlifter

Personal information
- Native name: עמוס גינוסר

Sport
- Country: Israel
- Sport: Weightlifting
Medal record
Event / 1st / 2nd / 3rd; Paralympic Games / 1 / 1 / 0
Representing Israel
Paralympic Games
Gold medal – first place	1992 Barcelona	Men's -60 kg
Silver medal – second place	1988 Seoul	Men's -57 kg

Amos Ginosar (Hebrew: עמוס גינוסר) is a former Israeli weightlifter who won two Paralympic medals and set several world records.

Ginosar was born in Kibbutz Ma'ayan Tzvi and later a resident of Kibbutz Ma'agan Michael.

He competed twice in the Summer Paralympics, winning a gold medal at the 1988 Summer Paralympics and a silver medal at the 1992 Summer Paralympics. His result in 1992 set a new world record in the men's -60 kg, pushing 175 kg.

Ginosar was associated with the Israel ParaSport Center. In 1990, he set a world record on live television while pushing 142.5 kg. While taking part in the Stoke Mandeville Games in 1991 he set another world record in the Men's -56 kg category, pushing 152.5 kg.
