= Athletics at the 1992 Summer Paralympics – Men's high jump B2 =

Men's high jump B2 at the IX Paralympic Games
- Paralympic Athletics
- Venue: Estadi Olímpic de Montjuïc
- Dates: September 1992
- Competitors: 7 from 5 nations

Medalists
1st place, gold medalist(s)		Alejo Velez	Spain
2nd place, silver medalist(s)		Juan Carlos Prieto	Spain
3rd place, bronze medalist(s)		Mohamad Khasseri Othman	Malaysia
3rd place, bronze medalist(s)		Akihito Motohashi	Japan

The Men's high jump B2 was a field event in athletics at the 1992 Summer Paralympics, for visually impaired athletes.

== Results ==
=== Final ===
Place	Athlete	Time
1	Alejo Velez (ESP)	1.86
2	Juan Carlos Prieto (ESP)	1.60
3	Mohamad Khasseri Othman (MAS)	1.60
3	Akihito Motohashi (JPN)	1.60
5	Yolmer Urdaneta (VEN)	1.60
-	Yean Kil Jung (KOR)	DNS
-	Juan António Prieto (ESP)	DNS
