= Weightlifting at the 1976 Summer Paralympics =

Weightlifting at the V Paralympic Games
- Paralympic Weightlifting
- Venue: Centennial Park West Arena
- Competitors: 43 from 16 nations

Weightlifting at the 1976 Summer Paralympics consisted of six events for men. The competition was held at the Centennial Park West Arena in Toronto, Ontario, Canada.

== Participating nations ==
There were 43 male competitors representing 16 nations.

- Australia (2)
- Belgium (2)
- Brazil (3)
- Canada (2)
- Finland (2)
- France (5)
- Great Britain (6)
- Guatemala (2)
- Israel (2)
- New Zealand (3)
- Norway (2)
- Poland (1)
- Sweden (2)
- Switzerland (2)
- United States (6)
- West Germany (1)

== Medal summary ==
=== Medal table ===
There were 18 medal winners representing nine nations.

Rank	Nation	Gold	Silver	Bronze	Total
1	United States	2	0	1	3
2	Israel	2	0	0	2
3	Sweden	1	1	0	2
4	Australia	1	0	1	2
5	France	0	4	0	4
6	Great Britain	0	1	0	1
7	New Zealand	0	0	2	2
8	Finland	0	0	1	1
8	Guatemala	0	0	1	1
Totals (9 entries)		6	6	6	18

=== Men's events ===
Event	Gold	Silver	Bronze
Men's light featherweight	Shmuel Haimovitz; Israel	Jean-Michel Barberane; France	Terry Mason; Australia
Men's featherweight	Benny Nilsson; Sweden	Joseph Ponnier; France	Jose Rolando; Guatemala
Men's lightweight	Edward Coyle; United States	Alex Eguers; France	Reuben Ngata; New Zealand
Men's middleweight	Vic Renalson; Australia	Aoudmond; France	Richard Taurer; United States
Men's light heavyweight	Abraham Strauch; Israel	R. Rowe; Great Britain	Fred Creba; New Zealand
Men's heavyweight	Jon Brown; United States	Bengt Lindberg; Sweden	Aimo Sohlmann; Finland
