= Powerlifting at the 2020 Summer Paralympics – Men's 107 kg =

Powerlifting – Men's 107 kg at the XVI Paralympic Games
- Venue: Tokyo International Forum
- Date: 30 August 2021
- Competitors: 9 from 9 nations

Medalists
1st place, gold medalist(s)		Enkhbayaryn Sodnompiljee	Mongolia
2nd place, silver medalist(s)		Jong Yee Khie	Malaysia
3rd place, bronze medalist(s)		Saman Razi	Iran

The men's 107 kg powerlifting event at the 2020 Summer Paralympics was contested on 30 August at Tokyo International Forum.

== Records ==
There are twenty powerlifting events, corresponding to ten weight classes each for men and women. Prior to this competition, the existing world and Paralympic records were as follows.

World Record	Enkhbayaryn Sodnompiljee (MGL)	247 kg	Nur-Sultan, Kazakhstan	18 July 2019
Paralympic Record	Pavlos Mamalos (GRE)	238 kg	Rio de Janeiro, Brazil	14 September 2016

== Results ==
Rank	Name	Body weight (kg)	Attempts (kg)				Result (kg)
Rank	Name	Body weight (kg)	1	2	3	4	Result (kg)
1st place, gold medalist(s)	Enkhbayaryn Sodnompiljee (MGL)	104.85	241	245 PR	~~248~~	–	245
2nd place, silver medalist(s)	Jong Yee Khie (MAS)	104.05	~~230~~	237	~~245~~	–	237
3rd place, bronze medalist(s)	Saman Razi (IRI)	105.95	~~231~~	231	~~233~~	–	231
4	Akaki Jintcharadze (GEO)	106.30	210	~~221~~	221	–	221
5	José de Jesús Castillo (MEX)	104.97	220	~~231~~	~~231~~	–	220
6	Jacob Schrom (USA)	105.79	215	218	~~221~~	–	218
7	Abbas Naisan (IRQ)	105.65	~~200~~	200	~~210~~	–	200
	Nuriddin Davlatov (UZB)	103.38	~~217~~	~~218~~	~~218~~	–	NM
	Elshan Huseynov (AZE)	105.47	~~225~~	~~225~~	~~231~~	–	NM
