= Brian McNicholl =

New Zealand-born Australian Paralympic athlete

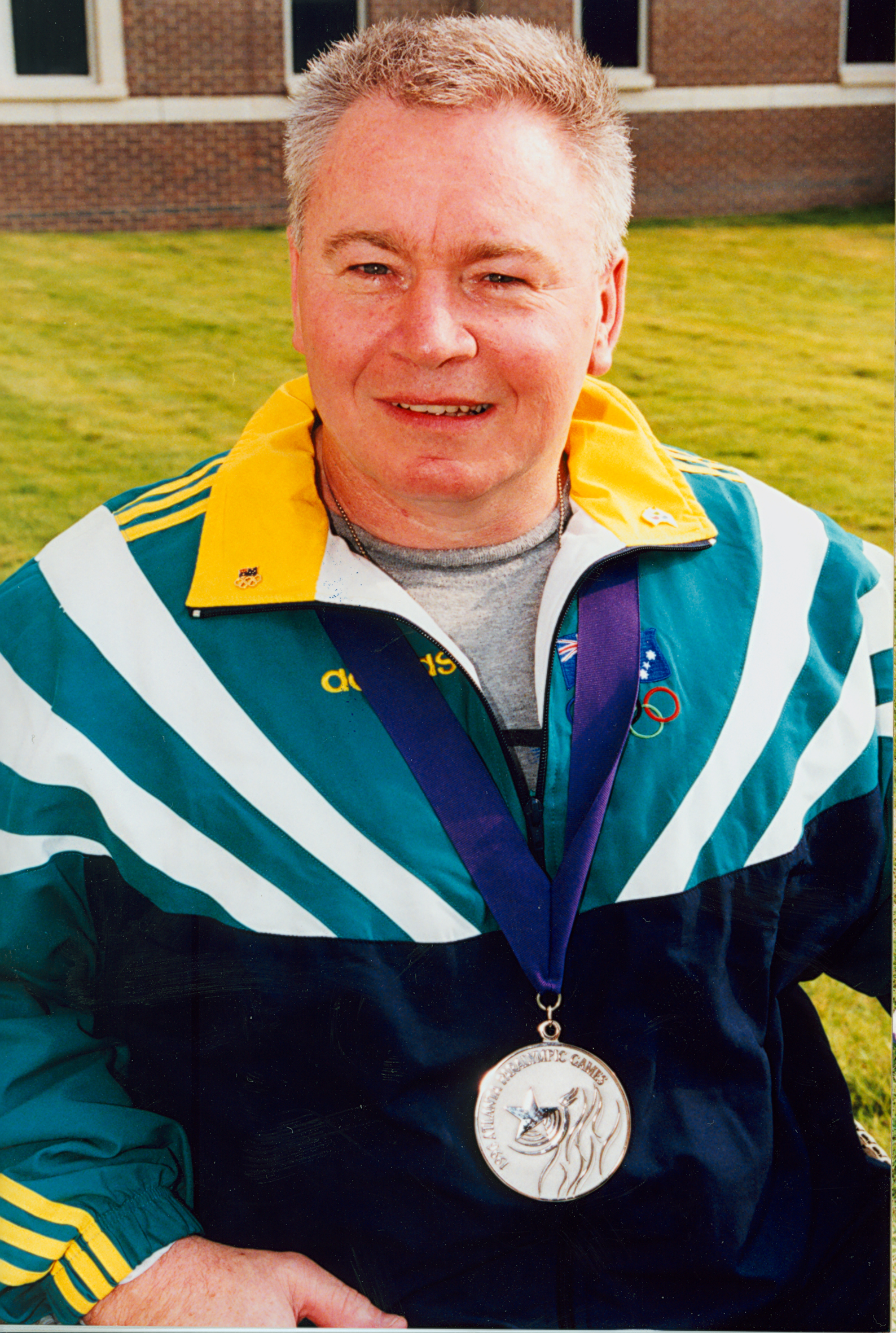
- McNicholl and his 1996 Summer Paralympic Games silver medal

Personal information
- Full name: Brian Frederick McNicholl
- Nationality: Australian
- Born: 30 December 1951 (age 74) Christchurch, New Zealand
Medal record
Paralympic Games
Representing New Zealand
Men's athletics
Silver medal – second place	1976 Toronto	Slalom 4
Representing Australia
Men's weightlifting
Gold medal – first place	1992 Barcelona	−90 kg
Bronze medal – third place	1980 Arnhem	−75 kg paraplegic
Bronze medal – third place	1988 Seoul	−85 kg
Men's powerlifting
Silver medal – second place	1996 Atlanta	−90 kg

Brian Frederick McNicholl, OAM (born 30 December 1951) is a New Zealand-born Australian Paralympic powerlifter, weightlifter, wheelchair basketballer, and athlete, who won five medals at six Paralympic games from 1976 to 1996.

== Personal ==
McNicholl was born on 30 December 1951 in Christchurch, New Zealand, and became a paraplegic after contracting polio at the age of eleven months. During school, he was forced to sit in the library while sport lessons were taking place; this fuelled his love for sport. He moved from New Zealand to Australia in 1978.

== Career ==
McNicholl's first and only medal for New Zealand was silver at the 1976 Toronto Games in the Men's Slalom 4 event. At the same games McNicholl competed in the 100 m race, and placed fourth in both shot put and the lightweight weightlifting event.

After moving to Australia in 1978, he represented the country at five Paralympics and won three bronze, another silver and a gold medal, all in weightlifting and powerlifting. At the 1980 Arnhem Games, he placed fourth again in the shot put event, was part of the Australia men's national wheelchair basketball team that came thirteenth at the Games, and won a bronze medal in the Men's Middleweight −75 kg paraplegic weightlifting event. At the 1984 New York/Stoke Mandeville Games, McNicholl finished 4th in the same weight bracket. In 1985, he won his first World Wheelchair Championships. McNicholl won another bronze medal at the 1988 Seoul Games in the Men's Up To 85 kg weightlifting event.

In 1991, McNicholl won his second World Wheelchair Weightlifting Championships at the University of Rhode Island, US, where he set a world record of 205 kilograms (452 lb). McNicholl's gold medal came at the 1992 Barcelona Games in the Men's Up To 90 kg event with his world record lift of 227.5 kilograms (502 lb), for which he was awarded the Medal of the Order of Australia. He later said of the win: "Although placed in other Paralympics (before '92), I was inexperienced and didn't quite know how to handle the pressure." In 1994, he set another world record when he lifted 230 kilograms (510 lb), and won his third World Wheelchair Weightlifting Championships in Melbourne, Australia. In 1995, he competed at the European Weightlifting Championships in Strasbourg, France, and won a gold medal with a lift of 200 kilograms (440 lb). He was coached by Blagoy Blagoev, and advised by Olympic runner Herb Elliott, who he has known since the 1980s. In 1995, he was an Australian Institute of Sport Athlete with a Disability scholarship holder.

His second silver medal, and first for Australia, was at the 1996 Atlanta Games in the Men's Up To 90 kg powerlifting event.

Despite being ranked second in the world in 1999, McNicholl retired from competitive lifting a few months before the 2000 Sydney Paralympics due to injury. That year, he received an Australian Sports Medal.

== Other sports work ==
McNicholl served as the Chairman of Australian Weightlifting for People With Disabilities. From 1995 to 1998, he was the strength and conditioning coach for Collingwood Football Club. He also spent six years promoting sport in schools for the Victorian Department of Sport and Recreation.
