= Mohamad Shaharuddin =

Malaysian paracyclist (born 1997)

Personal information
- Nationality: Malaysian
- Born: Mohamad Yusof Hafizi bin Shaharuddin; 30 September 1997 (age 29) Kuala Kangsar, Perak, Malaysia

Sport
- Country: Malaysia
- Sport: Para-cycling
- Disability class: C1
- Coached by: Sallehudin Noh
Medal record
Men's para-cycling
Representing Malaysia
Track World Championships
Gold medal – first place	2025 Rio de Janeiro	Sprint C1
Silver medal – second place	2025 Rio de Janeiro	1 km time trial C1
Silver medal – second place	2026 Apeldoorn	1 km time trial C1
Bronze medal – third place	2020 Milton	Scratch race C1
Bronze medal – third place	2022 Saint-Quentin-en-Yvelines	1 km time trial C1
Bronze medal – third place	2024 Rio de Janeiro	1 km time trial C1
Bronze medal – third place	2026 Apeldoorn	Scratch race C1
Bronze medal – third place	2026 Apeldoorn	Elimination C1
Bronze medal – third place	2026 Apeldoorn	Sprint C1
Asian Track Championships
Gold medal – first place	2024 New Delhi	1 km time trial C1
Asian Para Games
Silver medal – second place	2018 Jakarta	1 km time trial C1–3
Silver medal – second place	2018 Jakarta	Team sprint C1–5
Silver medal – second place	2022 Hangzhou	Team sprint C1-5
Bronze medal – third place	2022 Hangzhou	Individual pursuit C1
ASEAN Para Games
Gold medal – first place	2017 Kuala Lumpur	Mixed road time trial C1–3
Silver medal – second place	2017 Kuala Lumpur	1 km time trial C1–3
Bronze medal – third place	2017 Kuala Lumpur	Road race C1–3

Mohamad Yusof Hafizi Shaharuddin (born 30 September 1997) is a Malaysian racing cyclist who competes in para-cycling track and road events. He has won medals at the Track World Championships, ASEAN Para Games and Asian Para Games.

== Early life ==
Mohamad was born in Kuala Kangsar with nerve issues on his left side of his body.

== Career ==
Mohamad had won a gold medal, a silver medal and a bronze medal in the 2017 ASEAN Para Games organized in Kuala Lumpur. He also competed at the 2018 Asian Para Games in the Kilo C1–2–3 and C1-5 Men's Team Sprint events, winning the silver medal in both events.

Mohamad won a bronze medal at the Track World Championships in the men's 15 km scratch race event. He then participated in the 2020 Summer Paralympics held in Tokyo and placed fifth in the C1 men's individual time trial (road bicycle race).

Mohamad competed in the 2022 Track World Championships, winning a bronze medal in the time trial. He competed in the 2022 Asian Para Games, winning the silver medal at the team sprint event and the bronze medal in the individual pursuit.

Mohamad competed in the 2024 Track World Championships, winning the bronze medal in the time trial. He competed at the 2025 Track World Championships, winning the silver medal in the time trial and the gold medal in the sprint race.
