= Asian Para Cycling Championships =

Tournament for track cyclists with physical disabilities

The Asian Para Cycling Championships are the two asian championships for para-cycling, where athletes with a physical disability compete, organized by the Asian Cycling Confederation (ACC). The two separate competitions the Asian Para Track Cycling Championships and the Asian Para Road Cycling Championships are held annually.

== Asian Para Track Cycling Championships ==
Edition	Year	City	Country	Date	Velodrome	Ref
9	2021	Nur Sultan	Kazakhstan	13–18 June 2021	Saryarka Velodrome	
10	2022	New Delhi	India	18–20 June 2022	Indira Gandhi Arena	
11	2023	Nilai	Malaysia	14–19 June 2023	Velodrom Nasional Malaysia	
12	2024	New Delhi	India	21–26 February 2024	Indira Gandhi Arena	
13	2025	Phitsanulok	Thailand	7–16 February 2025		
14	2026	Al-Qassim Province	Saudi Arabia	5–13 February 2025		

Uzbekistan’s para-cycling victory at the 2025 Asian Championships with 26 medals — 12 gold, 9 silver and 5 bronze and 19 medals — 10 gold, 3 silver and 6 bronze in 2024.
