= Weightlifting at the 1992 Summer Paralympics =

Weightlifting at the IX Paralympic Games
- Paralympic Weightlifting
- Competitors: 44 from 18 nations

Paralympic symbol (1988-1994)

Weightlifting at the 1992 Summer Paralympics consisted of five events for men.

== Participating nations ==
There were 44 male competitors representing 18 nations.

- Australia (3)
- Bahrain (1)
- Burkina Faso (1)
- France (4)
- Great Britain (4)
- India (1)
- Iraq (3)
- Israel (4)
- Kenya (1)
- South Korea (1)
- Kuwait (2)
- Malaysia (3)
- Mexico (1)
- Oman (1)
- Switzerland (3)
- United Arab Emirates (1)
- United States (9)
- Venezuela (1)

== Medal summary ==
=== Medal table ===
There were 15 medal winners representing eight nations.

Rank	Nation	Gold	Silver	Bronze	Total
1	United States (USA)	2	0	2	4
2	Israel (ISR)	1	1	0	2
3	Australia (AUS)	1	0	0	1
3	South Korea (KOR)	1	0	0	1
5	France (FRA)	0	3	0	3
6	Malaysia (MAS)	0	1	1	2
7	Great Britain (GBR)	0	0	1	1
7	Kuwait (KUW)	0	0	1	1
Totals (8 entries)		5	5	5	15

=== Men's events ===
Event	Gold		Silver		Bronze	
Men's -52 kg	Keum-Jong Jung; South Korea	195.0	Cheok Kon Fatt; Malaysia	170.0	Anthony Peddle; Great Britain	160.0
Men's -60 kg	Amos Ginosar; Israel	175.0	Dominique Hainault; France	172.5	Mariappan Perumal; Malaysia	170.0
Men's -75 kg	Charles Roedelbronn; United States	192.5	Jean Grandsire; France	190.0	Gerald Millhouse; United States	172.5
Men's -90 kg	Brian McNicholl; Australia	227.5	Abraham Strauch; Israel	222.5	Mitchell Strickland; United States	222.5
Men's +90 kg	Kim Brownfield; United States	252.5	Edmond Haddad; France	212.5	Fouad Kout; Kuwait	205.0
