= Weightlifting at the 1980 Summer Paralympics =

Weightlifting at the VI Paralympic Games
- Paralympic Weightlifting
- Competitors: 58 from 18 nations

Weightlifting at the 1980 Summer Paralympics consisted of eleven events for men.

== Participating nations ==
There were 58 male competitors representing 18 nations.

- Australia (3)
- Belgium (1)
- Canada (1)
- Egypt (1)
- France (11)
- Great Britain (6)
- Iceland (2)
- Indonesia (2)
- Israel (3)
- Kenya (2)
- Luxembourg (1)
- Netherlands (1)
- Norway (1)
- Poland (6)
- Sweden (7)
- Switzerland (5)
- United States (4)
- West Germany (1)

== Medal summary ==
=== Medal table ===
There were 18 medal winners representing nine nations.

Rank	Nation	Gold	Silver	Bronze	Total
1	Sweden (SWE)	4	2	0	6
2	France (FRA)	3	4	3	10
3	Israel (ISR)	2	0	1	3
4	Poland (POL)	1	2	2	5
5	Indonesia (INA)	1	0	0	1
6	United States (USA)	0	2	0	2
7	Australia (AUS)	0	0	2	2
8	Belgium (BEL)	0	0	1	1
8	Iceland (ISL)	0	0	1	1
Totals (9 entries)		11	10	10	31

=== Men's events ===
Event	Gold	Silver	Bronze
Men's light-featherweight -51 kg paraplegic	Shmuel Haimovitz; Israel	Eugeniusz Skarupa; Poland	Jean-Michel Barberane; France
Men's featherweight -57 kg amputee	R. S. Arlen; Indonesia	None	None
Men's featherweight -57 kg paraplegic	Benny Nilsson; Sweden	Joseph Ponnier; France	Zdzislaw Kolodziej; Poland
Men's lightweight -65 kg amputee	Chorrihons; France	B. Dersigneri; France	Barry Kalms; Australia
Men's lightweight -65 kg paraplegic	Jerzy Kuskowski; Poland	Charles Roedelbronn; United States	Bogdan Lis; Poland
Men's middleweight -75 kg amputee	Bernard Barberet; France	Kurt Henningsson; Sweden	Jonas Oskarson; Iceland
Men's middleweight -75 kg paraplegic	Jean Grandsire; France	Edward Coyle; United States	Brian McNicholl; Australia
Men's light-heavyweight -85 kg amputee	Stig Soederborg; Sweden	J. Chauvel; France	Marcel Chollot; Belgium
Men's light-heavyweight -85 kg paraplegic	Abraham Strauch; Israel	Ryszard Tomaszewski; Poland	Gerard Houdmond; France
Men's heavyweight +85 kg amputee	Arne Karlsson; Sweden	Nils Karreberg; Sweden	J. L. Dury; France
Men's heavyweight +85 kg paraplegic	Bengt Lindberg; Sweden	N. Clemente; France	Shalom Dlugatch; Israel
