= Mario Hochberg =

German Paralympic weightlifter

Mario Hochberg (born 11 December 1970) was a German Paralympic weightlifter. His coach was Thomas Mersdorf and he is a sports instructor and physiotherapist head coach weightlifting in DBS.

== Biography ==
Mario Hochberg was born on 11 December 1970 in Gotha, East Germany. He trained in weightlifting and bench press even before he was disabled by an industrial accident in 1995. After the accident he was diagnosed with permanent spinal injury (Complete paraplegia TH 10). Mario Hochberg is still an athlete, father, caretaker, EU pensioner, club chairman Gotha beer keg lifter eV.

== Weightlifting achievements ==
2014 World Championship in Dubai, 5–11 April 2014 Occupied the 20th place of 35 athletes. 170 kg

2012 10th Place London Paralympics 170 kg (injury) 8th place out of 19 competitors 4th International Arabian Championships in Dubai with a capacity of 200 kg German champion Disabled Sports DBS with a capacity of 200 kg 1st place AK1 Giessener Championscup with 200 kg + 2nd place in the relative rating of all Masters one 1st place in the team standings of all competitors (Gotha team beer keg lift club) 1st place in the Thuringian State Championships assets AK 1 with 190 kg

2011 7th place out of 13 starters at the Third International Arabian Championships in Dubai with a capacity of 180 kg (after elbow surgery) German champion Disabled Sports DBS with a capacity of 180 kg (91.5 kg) 2nd place Giessener Championscup + first place in the team standings of all competitors (team GBFHV) 1st place Thuringian State Championships AK 1 with 180 kg 3rd International Cup in Bydgoszcz, Poland, with 190 kg 2nd place for international Dutch Championship in Breda with 200 kg of 6th Place 3rd Khor Fakkan IPC Powerlifting International Championship (UAE)

2010 4th place at the Second International Arabian Championships in Dubai with a capacity of 210 kg German champion Disabled Sports DBS with a capacity of 190 kg 1st place AK1 Giessener Championscup 190 kg + 2nd place in the relative rating of all Masters 1

2009 1st place for the 1st International Arabian Championships in Dubai on 17.03.2009 with a new personal best of 215 kg Sportsman of the year 2008 of the district of Gotha Thuringian State champion in the active (not disabled) with 210 kg German champion Disabled Sports DBS with a capacity of 210 kg (215 just fail) overall victory in the relative rating 1st place Giessener Championscup 210 kg + 2nd place in the relative rating of all active competitor 2nd place with the team at the Thuringia national championship with 205 kg 1st place in the international Dutch Championships in Breda with a capacity of 207.5 kg 2nd place in my weight class 100 + at the Polish Championship in Wrocław with a capacity of 202.5 kg

2008 1st place at the International Championship in Thessaloniki / Greece 26.01.08 with a capacity of 207.5 kg = personal best Thuringian State champion in the active (not disabled) with 205 kg German champion Disabled Sports DBS with a capacity of 210 kg = personal best + overall victory in the relative rating 2nd place Giessener Championscup 210 kg + 3rd place in the relative rating of all active competitors 5th Place and best Europeans at the Paralympics in Beijing with a capacity of 210 kg = international personal best Disabled athlete of the year 2008, the town of Gotha

2007 German champion Disabled Sports DBS with a capacity of 190 kg + overall victory in the relative rating Thuringian State champion in the active (not disabled) with 192.5 kg 3rd place at the European Championships in Kavala / Greece Mooslandl with 202.5 kg

2006 7th World Championship in Busan, South Korea with a capacity of 197.5 kg 2nd place to the Thuringian State Championships on the assets (not disabled)

2005 Thuringian State champion in the active (not disabled) with 200 kg of German champion Disabled Sports DBS with a capacity of 200 kg 3 Pl European Championships in Quarteira / Portugal with a capacity of 200 kg

2004 Thuringian State champion in the active (not disabled) German champions in DBS 1st place International Dutch Championship, Nijmegen pB 202.5 kg Participation in the Paralympics in Athens no placement (unfortunately ill)

2003 Thuringian State champion in the active (not disabled) German champion Disabled Sports DBS European champions in Piešťany / Slovakia with a capacity of 200 kg

2002 Thuringian State champion in the active (not disabled) German champion in the German Disabled Sports Association 5th World Cup in Kuala Lumpur / Malaysia (best Europeans) with 195 kg

2001 Thuringian State champion in the active (not disabled) German champion Disabled Sports DBS Vice European Champion in Hungary with a capacity of 197.5 kg Sportsman of the year 2001 of the district of Gotha

2000 1st place at the Thuringian State Championships on the assets (not disabled) German Championships in disabled sports DBS 3rd place 1st place at the Thuringian State Championships on the assets in the team classification Participation in the Paralympics in Sydney / Australia with the 11th place 192.5 kg

1999 2nd place to the Thuringian State Championships on the assets (not disabled) first participation at the German Championships in disabled sports DBS 3 Pl 1st place in the Thuringian State Championships on the assets in the team first international participation in a European Championship in Hungary 8 Pl 175 kg

1998 2nd place to the Thuringian State Championships on the assets (not disabled) 1st place at the Thuringian State Championships on the assets in the team 8th place at the German Championships of assets 3rd place at the German championships with the team

1997 first competition after his accident (1995) 2nd place to the Thuringian State Championships on the assets non-disabled participants
