= Weightlifting at the 1988 Summer Paralympics =

Weightlifting at the VIII Paralympic Games
- Paralympic Weightlifting
- Venue: Seoul Olympic Weightlifting Gymnasium
- Competitors: 66 from 21 nations

Paralympic symbol (1988-1994)

Weightlifting at the 1988 Summer Paralympics consisted of seven events for men.

== Participating nations ==
There were 66 male competitors representing 21 nations.

- Australia (5)
- Bahrain (2)
- Egypt (4)
- Finland (1)
- France (7)
- Great Britain (6)
- Guatemala (1)
- Indonesia (2)
- Israel (3)
- Italy (1)
- Jordan (3)
- South Korea (6)
- Kuwait (3)
- Malaysia (3)
- Mexico (1)
- Oman (1)
- Poland (3)
- Sweden (2)
- Switzerland (3)
- Trinidad and Tobago (2)
- United States (7)

== Medal summary ==
=== Medal table ===
There were 21 medal winners representing 12 nations.

Rank	Nation	Gold	Silver	Bronze	Total
1	Poland (POL)	2	0	0	2
2	United States (USA)	1	2	0	3
3	Israel (ISR)	1	1	1	3
4	Sweden (SWE)	1	1	0	2
5	Guatemala (GUA)	1	0	0	1
5	South Korea (KOR)	1	0	0	1
7	Egypt (EGY)	0	2	0	2
8	Mexico (MEX)	0	1	0	1
9	France (FRA)	0	0	3	3
10	Australia (AUS)	0	0	1	1
10	Malaysia (MAS)	0	0	1	1
10	Switzerland (SUI)	0	0	1	1
Totals (12 entries)		7	7	7	21

=== Men's events ===
Event	Gold		Silver		Bronze	
Men's -51 kg	Keum-Jong Jung; South Korea	180.0	Gomma G. Ahmed; Egypt	157.5	Shmuel Haimovitz; Israel	150.0
Men's -57 kg	Jose Rolando; Guatemala	175.0	Amos Ginosar; Israel	167.5	S/O M. Pe Mariappa; Malaysia	165.0
Men's -65 kg	Ryszard Fornalczyk; Poland	192.5	Gaed Moh Abdel Ha; Egypt	177.5	Dominique Hainault; France	172.5
Men's -75 kg	Charles Roedelbronn; United States	222.5	Kristoffer Hulecki; Sweden	205.0	Jean Grandsire; France	187.5
Men's -85 kg	Ryszard Tomaszewski; Poland	230.5	Mitchell Strickland; United States	200.0	Brian McNicholl; Australia	192.5
Men's -95 kg	Abraham Strauch; Israel	200.0	Victor Valdez; Mexico	195.0	Alfredo Battistini; Switzerland	187.5
Men's +95 kg	Bengt Lindberg; Sweden	250.0	Kim Brownfield; United States	230.0	Edmond Haddad; France	222.5
