= Matteo Tassetti =

Italian Paralympic athlete

Medal record

Track and field (athletics)

Representing Italy

Paralympic Games
Gold medal – first place	2000 Sydney	4x100 metre relay - T13

Matteo Tassetti is a paralympic athlete from Italy competing mainly in category T12 sprint events.

Matteo has competed in the 100m and 200m in the 1996, 2000 and 2004 Summer Paralympics but it was in the 2000 games where he won a gold medal in the 4 × 100 m relay as part of the Italian gold medal relay team.
