= Jong Yee Khie =

Malaysian Paralympic powerlifter

Personal information
- Nickname: Yee Khie
- Born: Jong Yee Khie; 19 November 1988 (age 37) Kuching, Sarawak, Malaysia

Sport
- Country: Malaysia
- Sport: Para powerlifting
- Disability: Limb deficiency
- Coached by: Jamil Adam
Medal record
Powerlifting
Representing Malaysia
Paralympic Games
Silver medal – second place	2020 Tokyo	Men's 107 kg
World Para Powerlifting World Cup
Silver medal – second place	2021 Dubai	Men's 107 kg
Commonwealth Games
Silver medal – second place	2018 Gold Coast	Men's heavyweight
Bronze medal – third place	2014 Glasgow	Men's +72 kg
Asian Para Games
Bronze medal – third place	2014 Incheon	Men's 97 kg
ASEAN Para Games
Gold medal – first place	2017 Kuala Lumpur	Men's 97 kg
Gold medal – first place	2015 Singapore	Men's 97 kg

Jong Yee Khie (simplified Chinese: 杨裕其; traditional Chinese: 楊裕其; pinyin: Yáng Yùqí; Jyutping: Joeng4 Jyu6 Kei4; Pe̍h-ōe-jī: Iôⁿ Jū-kî; born 19 November 1988) is a Malaysian powerlifter. He won a silver medal for Malaysia in powerlifting in the men's -107 kg event at the 2020 Summer Paralympics in Tokyo.

== Early and personal life ==
Jong hails from Batu Kawa, Kuching, Sarawak and worked as a hairdresser. He had his right leg amputated above the knee after being involved in a motorcycle accident in 2005. Jong was encouraged to take up the sport by his family during his recovery in 2008.
