= Hasihin Sanawi =

Malaysian Paralympic archer

Hasihin Sanawi SIS
Personal information
- Full name: Hasihin bin Sanawi
- Nickname: Hasihin
- Nationality: Malaysian
- Born: 15 June 1983 (age 43) Kuala Lumpur, Malaysia

Sport
- Sport: Archery
- Coached by: Amirullah Ahmad
Medal record
Representing Malaysia
Paralympic Games
Archery
Silver medal – second place	2012 London	Men's individual recurve W1/W2

Hasihin bin Sanawi (born 15 June 1983) is a Malaysian Paralympic archer.

In the 2012 Summer Paralympics, Sanawi won a silver medal. He was Malaysia's first Paralympic medalist in Archery.

== Honours ==
- Selangor
  - Companion of the Order of Sultan Sharafuddin Idris Shah (SIS) (2012)
