= Mohamad Khasseri Othman =

Malaysian Paralympic athlete

Medal record
Paralympic athletics
Representing Malaysia
Paralympic Games
Bronze medal – third place	1992 Barcelona	High Jump - B2

Mohamad Khasseri bin Othman is a former Malaysian Paralympian who won a bronze medal at the 1992 Paralympic Games in Barcelona.
