= Siow Lee Chan =

Malaysian Paralympic powerlifter

Siow Lee Chan 萧丽娟
Personal information
- Nationality: Malaysian
- Born: 27 February 1971 (age 55)

Sport
- Country: Malaysia
- Sport: Powerlifting
Medal record
Representing Malaysia
Women's powerlifting
Paralympic Games
Bronze medal – third place	2008 Beijing	56 kg
Asian Para Games
Silver medal – second place	2010 Guangzhou	60 kg

Siow Lee Chan (born 27 February 1971) is a former Malaysian Paralympic powerlifter. She won bronze at the 2008 Summer Paralympics in Beijing. She is also the first Malaysian female paralympian to ever win a medal at the Paralympics.
