= Cheok Kon Fatt =

Malaysian Paralympic weightlifter

Personal information
- Nationality: Malaysian

Sport
- Country: Malaysia
- Sport: Weightlifting, Powerlifting
Medal record
Representing Malaysia
Men's weightlifting
Paralympic Games
Silver medal – second place	1992 Barcelona	−52 kg
Commonwealth Games
Bronze medal – third place	2002 Manchester	Bench press

Cheok Kon Fatt is a former Malaysian Paralympic weightlifter. He won silver at the 1992 Summer Paralympics in Barcelona.
