= Mariappan Perumal =

Malaysian Paralympic Powerlifter

Personal information
- Full name: Mariappan a/l Perumal
- Nickname: P. Mariappan
- Nationality: Malaysian
- Born: 25 February 1958 (age 68) Malacca
- Weight: 72 kg (159 lb)

Sport
- Country: Malaysia
- Sport: Weightlifting, Powerlifting
- Disability: Polio
Medal record
Representing Malaysia
Men's powerlifting
Asian Para Games
Bronze medal – third place	2010 Guangzhou	75 kg
Men's weightlifting
Paralympic Games
Bronze medal – third place	1992 Barcelona	−60 kg
Bronze medal – third place	1988 Seoul	−57 kg

Mariappan Perumal (born 25 February 1958) is a former Malaysian Paralympic weightlifter. He won bronze at the 1988 Summer Paralympics and 1992 Summer Paralympics. He also won Malaysia's first Paralympic medal.
