= Paralympic Council Malaysia =

National Paralympic Committee of Malaysia

National Paralympic Committee
- Country: Malaysia
- Code: MAS
- Created: 18 May 1989
- Recognized: 1989
- Continental association: APC
- Headquarters: Pusat Kecemerlangan Sukan Paralimpik Malaysia, Jalan Perwira, Kampung Pandan, 55100 Kuala Lumpur, Malaysia
- President: Megat Shahriman Zaharudin
- Secretary General: First Admiral Dato' Subramaniam Raman (R)
- Website: paralympic.org.my

Paralympic Council Malaysia, (Malay: Majlis Paralimpik Malaysia, PCM or MPM) is the National Paralympic Committee (NPC) of Malaysia. The council was established on 18 May 1989 as the Malaysian Disabled Sports Council (Majlis Sukan Orang Cacat Malaysia). In 1996, it was renamed as Malaysian Paralympic Council and later as Paralympic Council of Malaysia. The Paralympic Council of Malaysia is currently headquartered at the Malaysia Paralympic Sports Excellence Centre (Malay: Pusat Kecemerlangan Sukan Paralimpik Malaysia, MPSEC or PKSPM).

== List of presidents ==
- 1991-2003: Fauzi Abdul Rahman
- 2005-2015: Zainal Abu Zarin
- 2015-2019: SM Nasarudin SM Nasimuddin
- 2019-present: Megat Shahriman Zaharudin

== See also ==
Malaysian achievements in Para Sports:

- Malaysia at the Paralympics
- Malaysia at the Asian Para Games
- Malaysia at the ASEAN Para Games

Olympic Counterpart:

- Olympic Council of Malaysia
