= Nigeria at the Paralympics =

- IPC code: NGR
- NPC: Nigeria Paralympic Committee
- Medals Ranked 37th: Gold 40 Silver 19 Bronze 21 Total 80

Summer appearances
- 1992; 1996; 2000; 2004; 2008; 2012; 2016; 2020; 2024

Nigeria made its Paralympic Games début at the 1992 Summer Paralympics in Barcelona. It sent a delegation of six male athletes to compete in track & field, powerlifting and table tennis.

== History ==
Nigeria made its Paralympic Games début at the 1992 Summer Paralympics in Barcelona when they sent a delegation of six men to compete in track & field, powerlifting and table tennis. Adeoye Ajibola won two gold medals in sprint, while Monday Emoghawve obtained one in powerlifting. Nigeria has participated in every subsequent edition of the Summer Paralympics, though it has never taken part in the Winter Paralympics.

At the Tokyo 2020 Summer Games, Nigeria won 10 medals (4 gold, 1 silver, and 5 bronze), and Nigeria won 7 more medals (2 gold, 3 silver, and 2 bronze) at the Paris 2024, bringing its total to 87.

== Medals ==
=== Medals by Summer Games ===
Games	Athletes	Gold	Silver	Bronze	Total	Rank
(Italy) 1960 Rome	did not participate					
(Japan) 1964 Tokyo	did not participate					
(Israel) 1968 Tel Aviv	did not participate					
(Germany) Heidelberg 1972	did not participate					
(Canada) Toronto 1976	did not participate					
(Netherlands) Arnhem 1980	did not participate					
(United States) New York 1984 - (United Kingdom) Stoke Mandeville 1984	did not participate					
(South Korea) Seoul 1988	did not participate					
(Spain) Barcelona 1992	6	3	0	0	3	21
(United States) Atlanta 1996	8	3	2	3	8	21
(Australia) Sydney 2000	31	7	1	5	13	23
(Greece) Athens 2004	14	5	4	3	12	23
(China) Beijing 2008	28	4	4	1	9	29
(United Kingdom) London 2012	27	6	5	2	13	23
(Brazil) Rio de Janeiro 2016	23	8	2	2	12	30
(Japan) Tokyo 2020	22	4	1	5	10	33
(France) Paris 2024	24	2	3	2	7	40
(United States) Los Angeles 2028
(Australia) Brisbane 2032
Total		40	19	21	80	36

=== Medals by Winter Games ===
Games	Athletes	Gold	Silver	Bronze	Total	Rank
(Sweden) Örnsköldsvik 1976	did not participate					
(Norway) Geilo 1980	did not participate					
(Austria) Innsbruck 1984	did not participate					
(Austria) Innsbruck 1988	did not participate					
(France) Albertville 1992	did not participate					
(Norway) Lillehammer 1994	did not participate					
(Japan) Nagano 1998	did not participate					
(United States) Salt Lake City 2002	did not participate					
(Italy) Turin 2006	did not participate					
(Canada) Vancouver 2010	did not participate					
(Russia) Sochi 2014	did not participate					
(South Korea) Pyeongchang 2018	did not participate					
(China) Beijing 2022	Future event					
Total		0	0	0	0	−

=== Medals by Summer Sport ===
Games	Gold	Silver	Bronze	Total
Athletics	14	4	4	22
Powerlifting	26	18	14	58
Table tennis	2	0	4	6
Badminton	0	0	1	1
Total	42	22	23	87

=== Medals by Winter Sport ===
Games	Gold	Silver	Bronze	Total
Total	0	0	0	0

== Medallists ==
Nigeria made its Paralympic debut at the 1992 Summer Paralympics, where they claimed three gold medals.

Medal	Name	Games	Sport	Event
Gold	Adeoye Ajibola	(Spain) 1992 Barcelona	Athletics	Men's 100m TS4
Gold	Adeoye Ajibola	(Spain) 1992 Barcelona	Athletics	Men's 200M TS4
Gold	Monday Emoghawve	(Spain) 1992 Barcelona	Powerlifting	Men's 48 kg
Gold	Adeoye Ajibola	(United States) 1996 Atlanta	Athletics	Men's 100m T45-46
Gold	Adeoye Ajibola	(United States) 1996 Atlanta	Athletics	Men's 200m T45-46
Gold	Monday Emoghawve	(United States) 1996 Atlanta	Powerlifting	Men's 60 kg
Silver	Adeoye Ajibola	(United States) 1996 Atlanta	Athletics	Men's long jump F45-46
Silver	Abraham Obaretin	(United States) 1996 Atlanta	Powerlifting	Men's 48 kg
Bronze	Johnson Sulola	(United States) 1996 Atlanta	Powerlifting	Men's 52 kg
Bronze	Patrick Akutaekwe	(United States) 1996 Atlanta	Powerlifting	Men's 100 kg
Bronze	Nasiru Sule	(United States) 1996 Atlanta	Table tennis	Women's open 1-5
Gold	Edith Nzuruike	(Australia) 2000 Sydney	Athletics	Women's javelin F58
Gold	Monday Emoghawve	(Australia) 2000 Sydney	Powerlifting	Men's 67.5 kg
Gold	Iyabo Ismaila	(Australia) 2000 Sydney	Powerlifting	Women's 48 kg
Gold	Victoria Nneji	(Australia) 2000 Sydney	Powerlifting	Women's 60 kg
Gold	Patricia Okafor	(Australia) 2000 Sydney	Powerlifing	Women's 67.5 kg
Gold	Tajudeen Agunbiade	(Australia) 2000 Sydney	Table Tennis	Men's singles class 9
Gold	Tajudeen Agunbiade; Tunde Adisa; Femi Alabi	(Australia) 2000 Sydney	Table Tennis	Men's team class 9
Silver	Lucy Ejike	(Australia) 2000 Sydney	Powerlifting	Women's 44 kg
Bronze	Stephen Davou	(Australia) 2000 Sydney	Powerlifting	Men's 56 kg
Bronze	Patricia Nnaji	(Australia) 2000 Sydney	Powerlifting	Women's 52 kg
Bronze	Kike Adedeji	(Australia) 2000 Sydney	Powerlifting	Women's 75 kg
Bronze	Faith Igbinehin	(Australia) 2000 Sydney	Powerlifting	Women's +82.5kg
Bronze	Femi Alabi	(Australia) 2000 Sydney	Table tennis	Men's singles class 9
Gold	Adekundo Adesoji	(Greece) 2004 Athens	Athletics	Men's 100m T12
Gold	Adekundo Adesoji	(Greece) 2004 Athens	Athletics	Men's 200m T12
Gold	Adekundo Adesoji	(Greece) 2004 Athens	Athletics	Men's 400m T12
Gold	Silver Ezeikpe	(Greece) 2004 Athens	Athletics	Men's javelin F58
Gold	Lucy Ejike	(Greece) 2004 Athens	Powerlifting	Women's 44 kg
Silver	Eucharia Iyiazi	(Greece) 2004 Athens	Athletics	Women's javelin F56-58
Silver	Solomon Ikechukwu	(Greece) 2004 Athens	Powerlifting	Men's 100 kg
Silver	Ijeoma John	(Greece) 2004 Athens	Powerlifting	Women's 40 kg
Silver	Patience Aghimile	(Greece) 2004 Athens	Powerlifting	Women's 56 kg
Bronze	Ruel Ishaku	(Greece) 2004 Athens	Powerlifting	Women's 48 kg
Bronze	Kike Adedeji	(Greece) 2004 Athens	Powerlifting	Women's 75 kg
Bronze	Grace Anozie	(Greece) 2004 Athens	Powerlifting	Women's +82.5kg
Gold	Eucharia Iyiazi	(China) 2008 Beijing	Athletics	Women's shot put F57/58
Gold	Eucharia Iyiazi	(China) 2008 Beijing	Athletics	Women's discus F57/58
Gold	Lucy Ejike	(China) 2008 Beijing	Powerlifting	Women's 48 kg
Gold	Ruel Ishaku	(China) 2008 Beijing	Powerlifting	Men's 48 kg
Silver	Adekunle Adesoji	(China) 2008 Beijing	Athletics	Men's 100m T12
Silver	Obioma Daleth	(China) 2008 Beijing	Powerlifting	Men's 100 kg
Silver	Grace Anozie	(China) 2008 Beijing	Powerlifting	Women's +82.5kg
Silver	Amoge Victoria	(China) 2008 Beijing	Powerlifting	Women's 67.5kg
Bronze	Patience Aghimile	(China) 2008 Beijing	Powerlifting	Women's 60 kg
Gold	Yakubu Adesokan	(United Kingdom) 2012 London	Powerlifting	Men's 48 kg
Gold	Ivory Nwokorie	(United Kingdom) 2012 London	Powerlifting	Women's 44 kg
Gold	Esther Oyema	(United Kingdom) 2012 London	Powerlifting	Women's 48 kg
Gold	Joy Onaolapo	(United Kingdom) 2012 London	Powerlifting	Women's 52 kg
Silver	Ikechukwu Obichukwu	(United Kingdom) 2012 London	Powerlifting	Men's 52 kg
Silver	Anthony Ulonnam	(United Kingdom) 2012 London	Powerlifting	Men's 56 kg
Silver	Folashade Oluwafemiayo	(United Kingdom) 2012 London	Powerlifting	Women's 75 kg
Silver	Ifeanyi Nnajiofor	(United Kingdom) 2012 London	Powerlifting	Men's 60 kg
Silver	Lucy Ejike	(United Kingdom) 2012 London	Powerlifting	Women's 56 kg
Bronze	Eucharia Iyiazi	(United Kingdom) 2012 London	Athletics	Women's shot put F57-58
Bronze	Victoria Nneji	(United Kingdom) 2012 London	Powerlifting	Women's 67.5 kg
Gold	Roland Ezuruike	(Brazil) 2016 Rio de Janeiro	Powerlifting	Men's 54 kg
Gold	Paul Kehinde	(Brazil) 2016 Rio de Janeiro	Powerlifting	Men's 65 kg
Gold	Lauritta Onye	(Brazil) 2016 Rio de Janeiro	Athletics	Women's shot put F40
Gold	Lucy Ejike	(Brazil) 2016 Rio de Janeiro	Powerlifting	Women's 61 kg
Gold	Ndidi Nwosu	(Brazil) 2016 Rio de Janeiro	Powerlifting	Women's 73 kg
Gold	Bose Omolayo	(Brazil) 2016 Rio de Janeiro	Powerlifting	Women's 79 kg
Gold	Josephine Orji	(Brazil) 2016 Rio de Janeiro	Powerlifting	Women's +86 kg
Silver	Latifat Tijani	(Brazil) 2016 Rio de Janeiro	Powerlifting	Women's 45 kg
Silver	Esther Oyema	(Brazil) 2016 Rio de Janeiro	Powerlifting	Women's 55 kg
Bronze	Nnamdi Innocent	(Brazil) 2016 Rio de Janeiro	Powerlifting	Men's 72 kg
Bronze	Eucharia Iyiazi	(Brazil) 2016 Rio de Janeiro	Athletics	Women's discus throw F57
Gold	Folashade Oluwafemiayo	(Japan) 2020 Tokyo	Powerlifting	Women's 86 kg
Gold	Bose Omolayo	(Japan) 2020 Tokyo	Powerlifting	Women's 79 kg
Gold	Latifat Tijani	(Japan) 2020 Tokyo	Powerlifting	Women's 45 kg
Gold	Flora Ugunwa	(Japan) 2020 Tokyo	Athletics	Women's Javelin F54
Silver	Loveline Obiji	(Japan) 2020 Tokyo	Powerlifting	Women's 86 kg
Bronze	Tajudeen Agunbiade	(Japan) 2020 Tokyo	Table tennis	Men's Teams Classes 9-10
Bronze	Lucy Ejike	(Japan) 2020 Tokyo	Powerlifting	Women's 61 kg
Bronze	Victor Farinloye	(Japan) 2020 Tokyo	Table tennis	Men's Teams Classes 9-10
Bronze	Olaitan Ibrahim	(Japan) 2020 Tokyo	Powerlifting	Women's 67 kg
Bronze	Eucharia Iyiazi	(Japan) 2020 Tokyo	Athletics	Women's Shot put F57
Bronze	Femi Alabi	(Japan) 2020 Tokyo	Table Tennis	Men's Teams Classes 9-10
Bronze	Lauritta Onye	(Japan) 2020 Tokyo	Athletics	Women's Shot put F40
Gold	Onyinyechi Mark	(France) 2024 Paris	Powerlifting	Women's 61 kg
Gold	Folashade Oluwafemiayo	(France) 2024 Paris	Powerlifting	Women's +86 kg
Silver	Esther Nworgu	(France) 2024 Paris	Powerlifting	Women's 41 kg
Silver	Bose Omolayo	(France) 2024 Paris	Powerlifting	Women's 79 kg
Silver	Flora Ugwunwa	(France) 2024 Paris	Athletics	Women's javelin throw F54
Bronze	Mariam Eniola Bolaji	(France) 2024 Paris	Badminton	Women's singles SL3
Bronze	Isau Ogunkunle	(France) 2024 Paris	Table tennis	Men's individual Class 4

== See also ==
- Nigeria at the Olympics
