= Münchhausen (surname) =

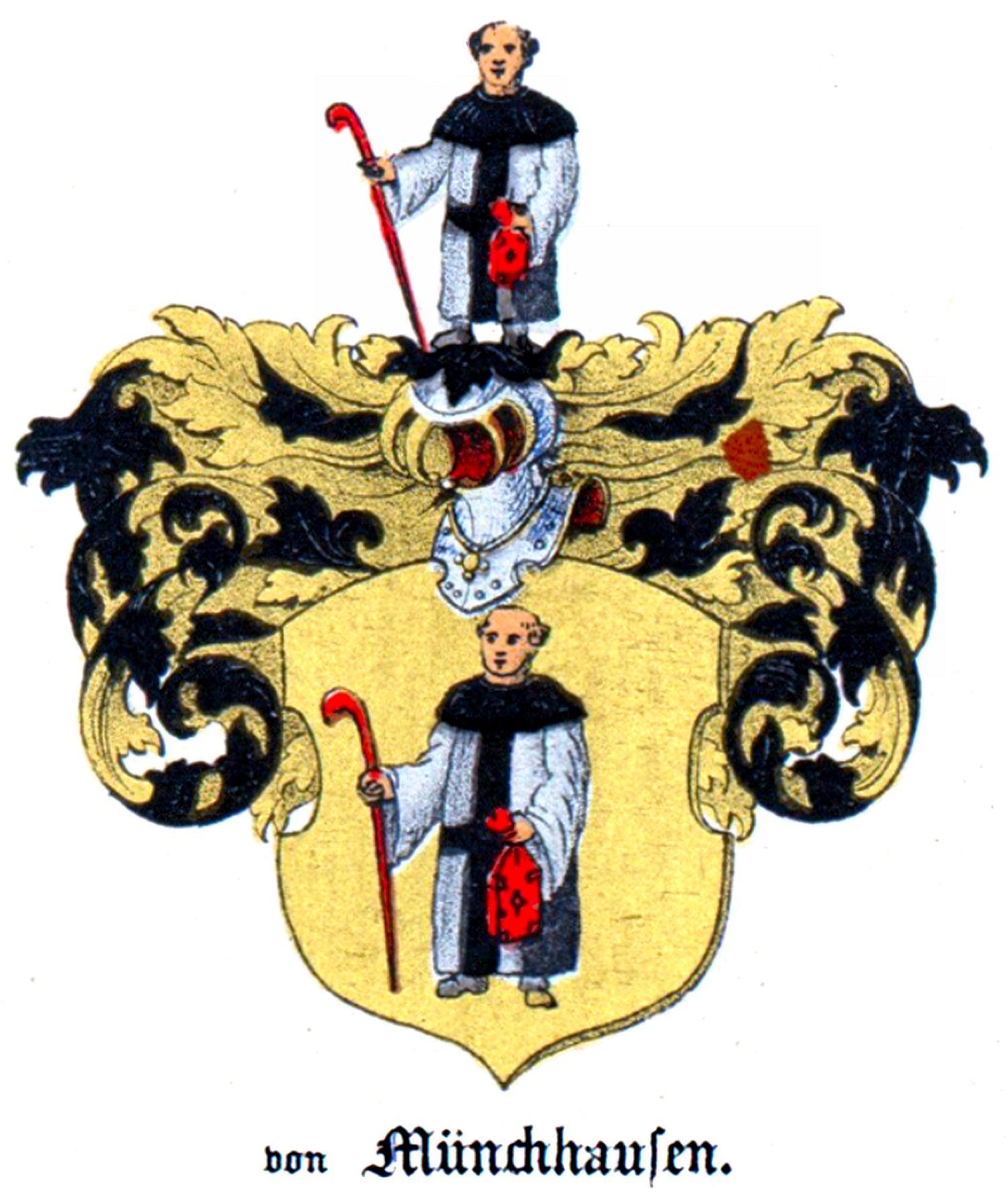
Arms of the Münchhausen family

The Münchhausen family (German pronunciation: [ˈmʏnçˌhaʊzn̩]) or von Münchhausen is an ancient German noble family from Lower Saxony and Saxony-Anhalt.

== History ==
The family first appeared in written documents in 1183 with dominus Rembertus, pater Gyselheri de Monechusen. Their family seat was in Munichehausen, near Loccum Abbey. At first, they were Ministerialis, but later rose to the position of Erbmarshall of the Prince-Bishops of Minden.

In the 15th century, two branches of the family were formed, the so called black line and a white line, both extant until today.

Members of the family held the title of Freiherr and occupied many important ecclesiastical and diplomatic positions in the history within the Holy Roman Empire and later in the German Empire.

== Notable members ==
- Hieronymus Karl Friedrich, Freiherr von Münchhausen, German nobleman and storyteller
- Baron Munchausen, fictional character inspired by Hieronymus Karl Friedrich, Freiherr von Münchhausen
- Börries von Münchhausen, German poet
- Otto von Münchhausen, German botanist
- Johannes V von Münchhausen (1542–1560), Prince-Bishop of Ösel–Wiek
- Philipp Adolph von Münchhausen (1694-1762), Head of the German Chancery in London

== See also ==
- Münchhausen (disambiguation), for other uses
- Freiherr von Münchhausen (disambiguation)
