= Kim Brownfield =

American Paralympic powerlifter

Personal information
- Born: Dewar, Oklahoma, U.S.
- Height: 178 cm (5 ft 10 in)
- Weight: 100 kg (220 lb)

Sport
- Country: United States
- Sport: Paralympic powerlifting
- Disability: Polio
- Retired: 2006
Medal record
Paralympic powerlifting
Representing United States
Paralympic Games
Gold medal – first place	1992 Barcelona	Men's +100kg
Gold medal – first place	1996 Atlanta	Men's +100kg
Silver medal – second place	2000 Sydney	Men's +100kg

Kim Brownfield is a former Paralympic powerlifter who has won five Paralympic medals. He won his first medal in 1988 Summer Paralympics, aged 23.
