= Ryszard Tomaszewski =

Polish sportsperson (born 1951)

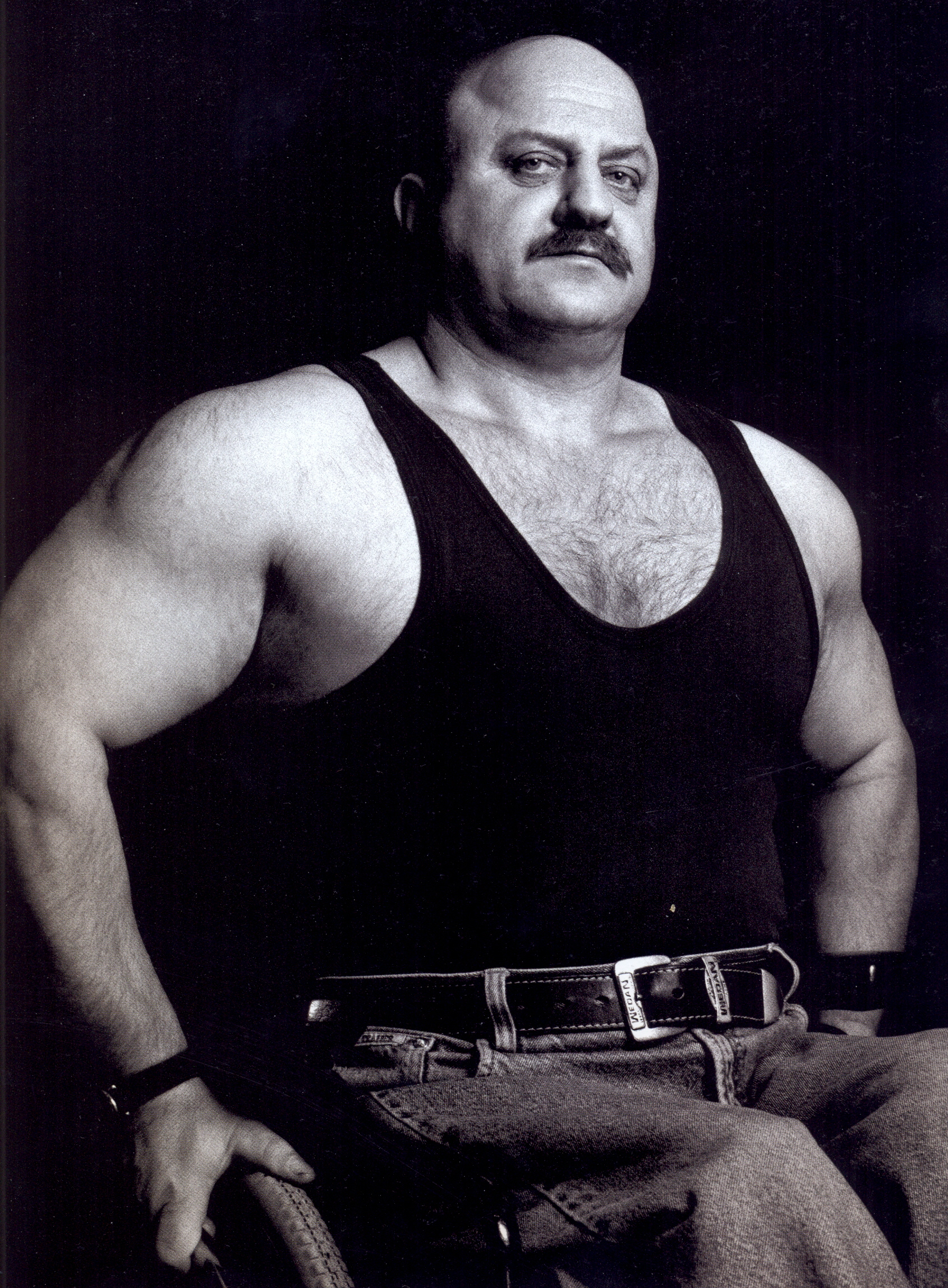

Personal information
- Born: 20 August 1951 (age 74) Stawiszyn, Poland

Sport
- Country: Poland
- Sport: Paralympic powerlifting Paralympic athletics
- Disability: Spinal cord injury
Medal record
Representing Poland
Paralympic Games
Paralympic powerlifting
Gold medal – first place	1988 Seoul	Men's -85kg
Gold medal – first place	1992 Barcelona	Men's -90kg
Gold medal – first place	1996 Atlanta	Men's -90kg
Silver medal – second place	1980 Arnhem	Men's -85kg
Paralympic athletics
Silver medal – second place	1984 Stoke Mandeville/New York	Discus throw 2
Bronze medal – third place	1984 Stoke Mandeville/New York	Shot put 2

Ryszard Tomaszewski (born 20 August 1951) is a retired Polish Paralympic powerlifter, discus thrower and shot putter. He was a triple Paralympic champion in powerlifting and a two-time medalist in athletics.

== Life changing accident ==
In 1971, he was involved in an accident at work in Żelazno where he and a team of other geologists went to research the construction of a bridge near the town. A 800 kg chisel from a drilling tower fell onto him and a drill technician, the mechanical instrument hit the technician on the head and hit Tomaszewski's back. The pier that they both stood on collapsed and they fell into the water. They were both rescued from the water but they were both unconscious, the technician had lost a lot of blood from the accident but Tomaszewski had a suspected broken vertebra. The two casualties were thrown into the back of a car and were taken to hospital in Kłodzko, halfway through the journey, the technician was taken by ambulance and went to the nearest hospital while Tomaszewski was still in the car, he described the road as very bumpy and the car was travelling very fast. Once he reached to the nearest hospital, the doctor who examined him confirmed that he had suffered a spinal cord injury.

Tomaszewski was in an induced coma in a hospital in Wrocław to receive treatment and received rehabilitation in Konstancin.
