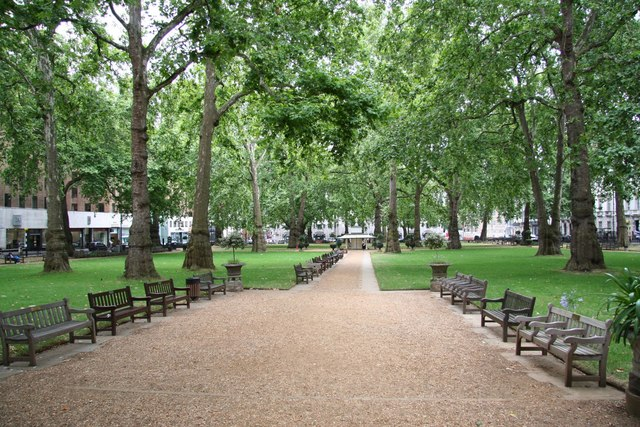
- London plane trees in Berkeley Square, London, planted 1789

Scientific classification
- Kingdom: Plantae
- Clade: Tracheophytes
- Clade: Angiosperms
- Clade: Eudicots
- Order: Proteales
- Family: Platanaceae
- Genus: Platanus
- Species: P. × hispanica

Binomial name
- Platanus × hispanica Mill. ex Münchh.

Synonyms
- Platanus × acerifolia (Aiton) Willd.; Platanus orientalis var. acerifolia Aiton; Platanus × acerifolia f. pyramidalis (Bolle ex Janko) C.K.Schneid.; Platanus × acerifolia f. suttneri (Jaennicke) C.K.Schneid.; Platanus × acerifolia var. hispanica auct. non Mill. ex Münchh., nom. dub.; Platanus × acerifolia var. kelseyana (Jaennicke) C.K.Schneid.; Platanus × hybrida Brot.

= London plane =

Species of tree

The London plane, or sometimes hybrid plane, Platanus × hispanica, is a tree in the genus Platanus. It is often known by the synonym Platanus × acerifolia, a later name. It is a hybrid of Platanus orientalis (oriental plane) and Platanus occidentalis (American sycamore).

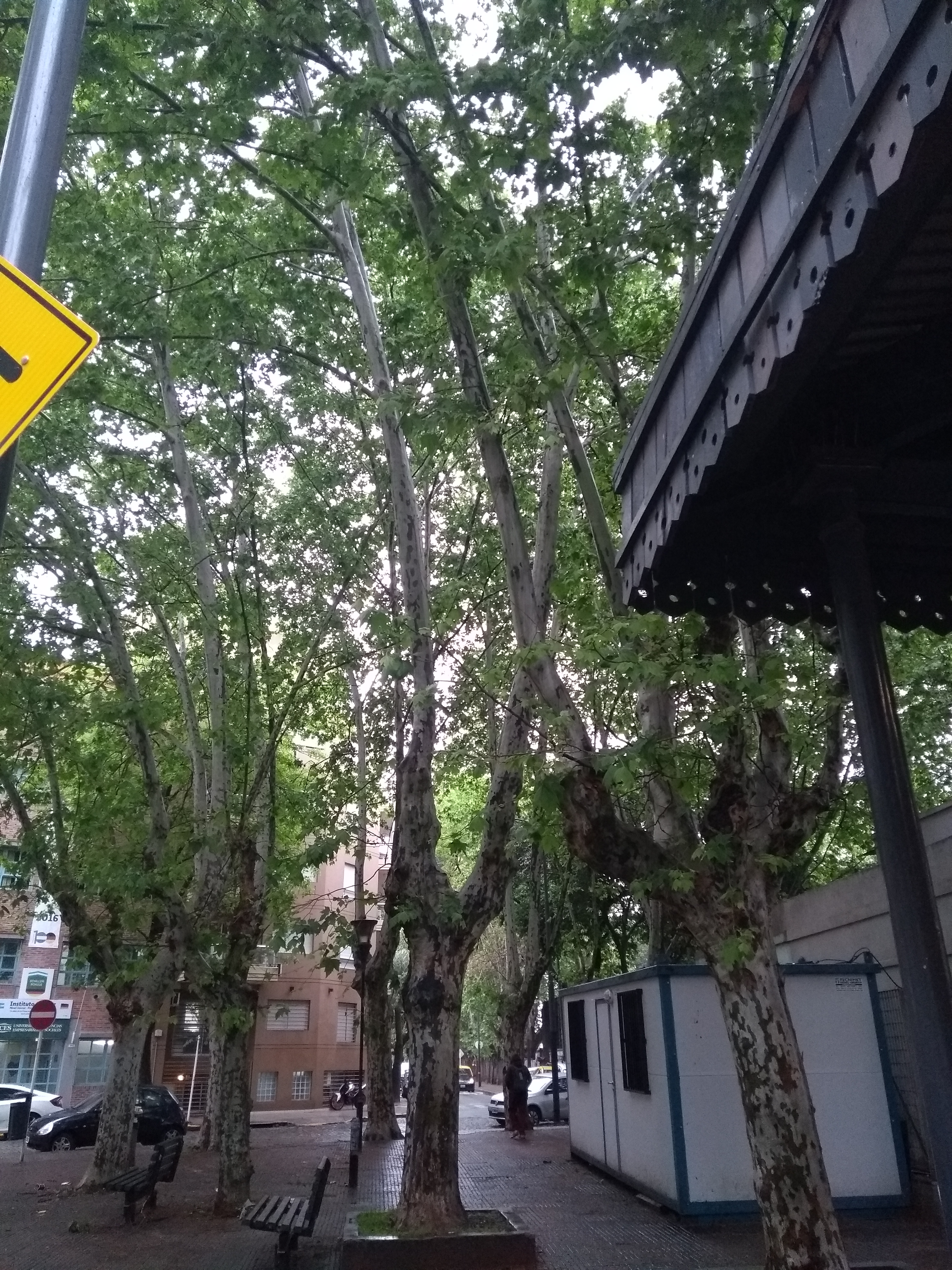
Platanus x hispanica

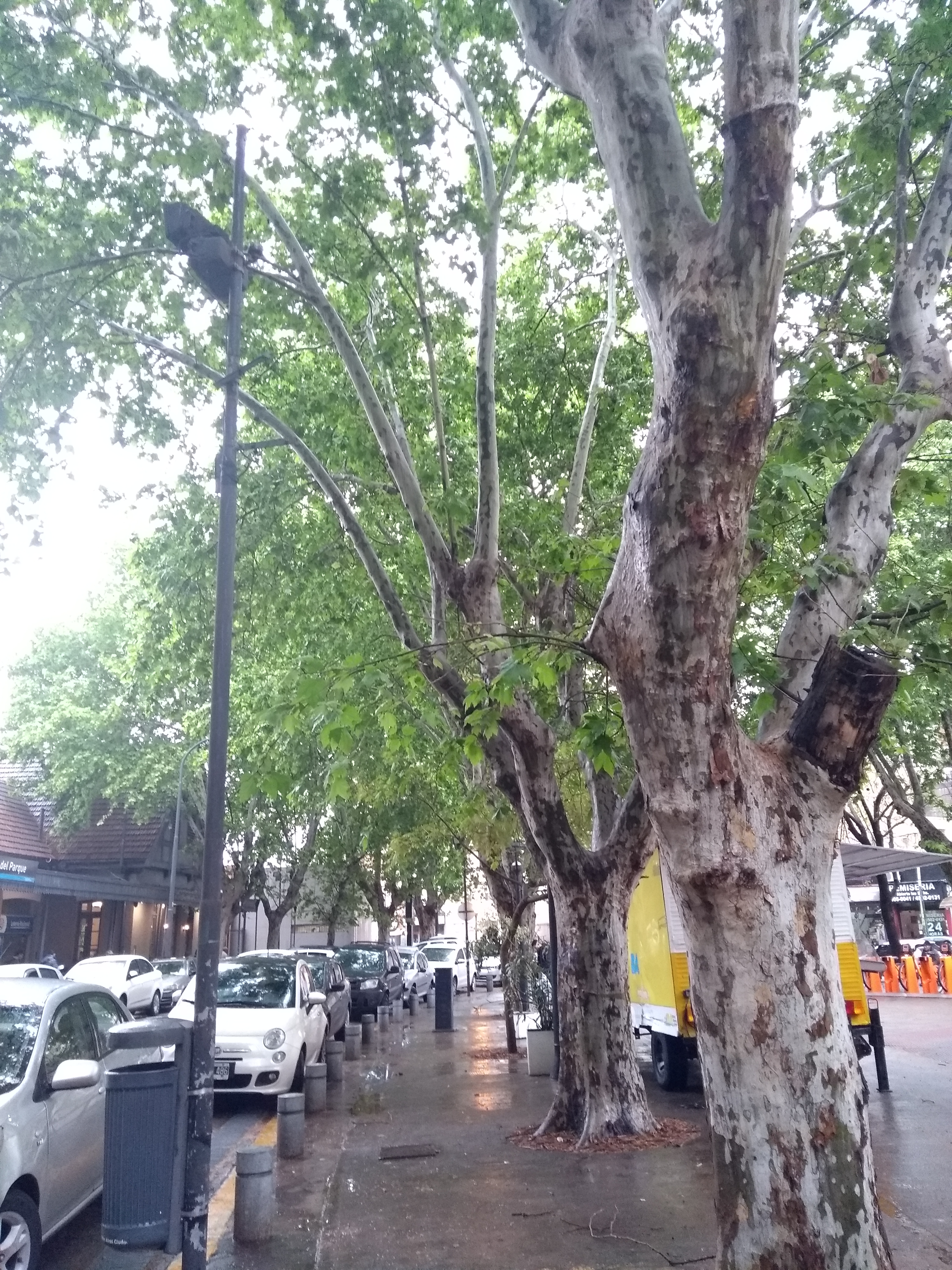
Hybrid plane trees in Villa del Parque Train Station, Buenos Aires

== Description ==
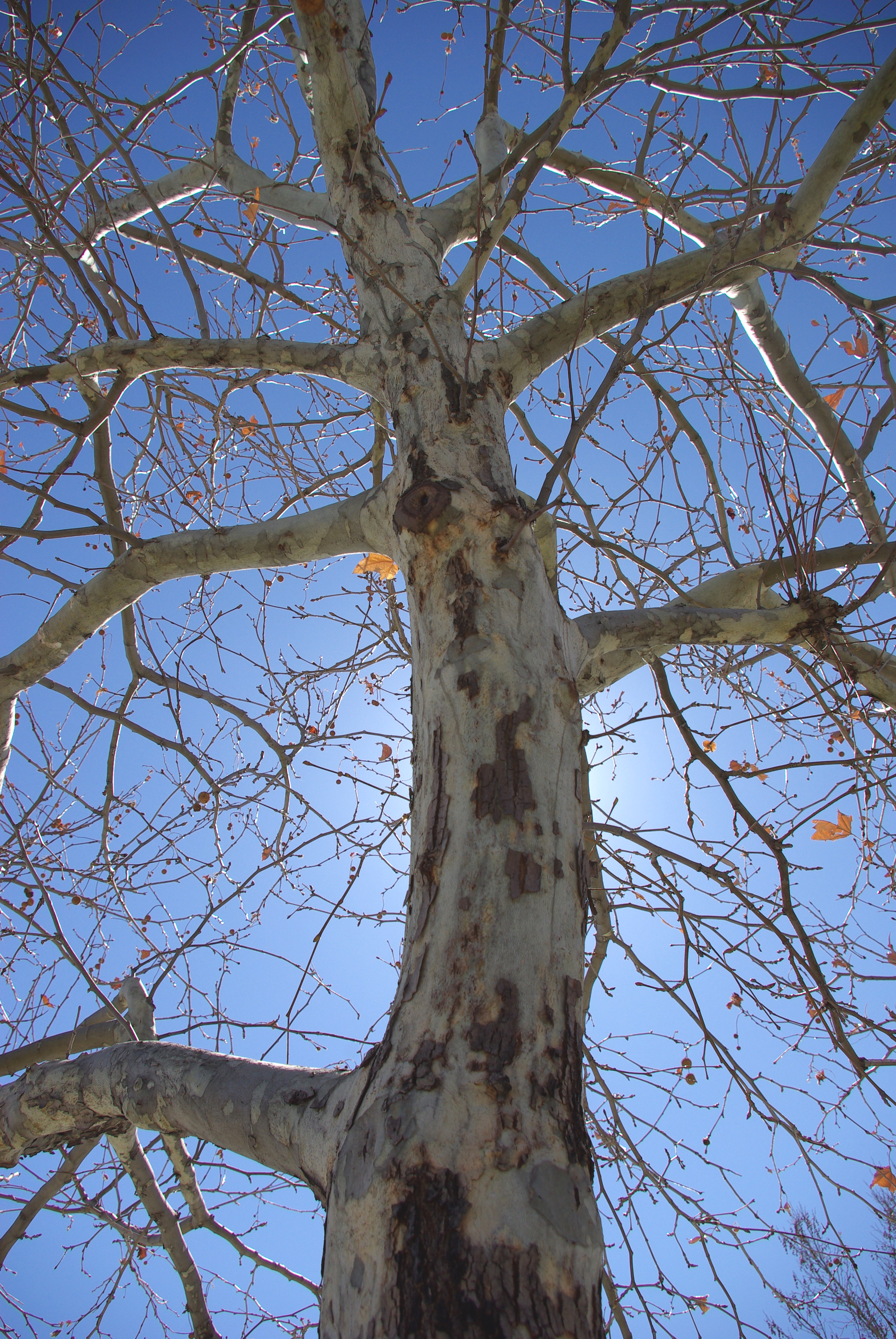
London plane on the campus of New Mexico State University

The London plane is a large deciduous tree growing 20–40 m (65–130 ft), exceptionally to 50 m (160 ft) tall, with a trunk up to 10 m (33 ft) in circumference. The bark is usually pale grey-green, smooth and exfoliating, or buff-brown and not exfoliating. The leaves are thick and stiff-textured, broad, palmately lobed, superficially maple-like, the leaf blade 10–20 cm (4–8 in) long and 12–25 cm (5–10 in) broad, with a petiole 3–10 cm (1–4 in) long. The young leaves in spring are coated with minute, fine, stiff hairs at first, but these wear off and by late summer the leaves are hairless or nearly so. The flowers are borne in one to three (most often two) dense spherical inflorescences on a pendulous stem, with male and female flowers on separate stems (monoecy). The fruit matures in about 6 months, to 2–3 centimetres (0.8–1.2 in) diameter, and comprises a dense spherical cluster of achenes with numerous stiff hairs which aid wind dispersal; the cluster breaks up slowly over the winter to release the numerous 2–3 mm (0.08–0.12 in) seeds. The London Plane is one of the most efficient trees in removing small particulate pollutants in urban areas.

It shares many visual similarities with American sycamore (Platanus occidentalis), from which it is derived; however, the two species are relatively easy to distinguish, considering the London plane is almost exclusively planted in urban habitats, while American sycamore is most commonly found growing in lowlands and alluvial soils along streams.

== Origin ==
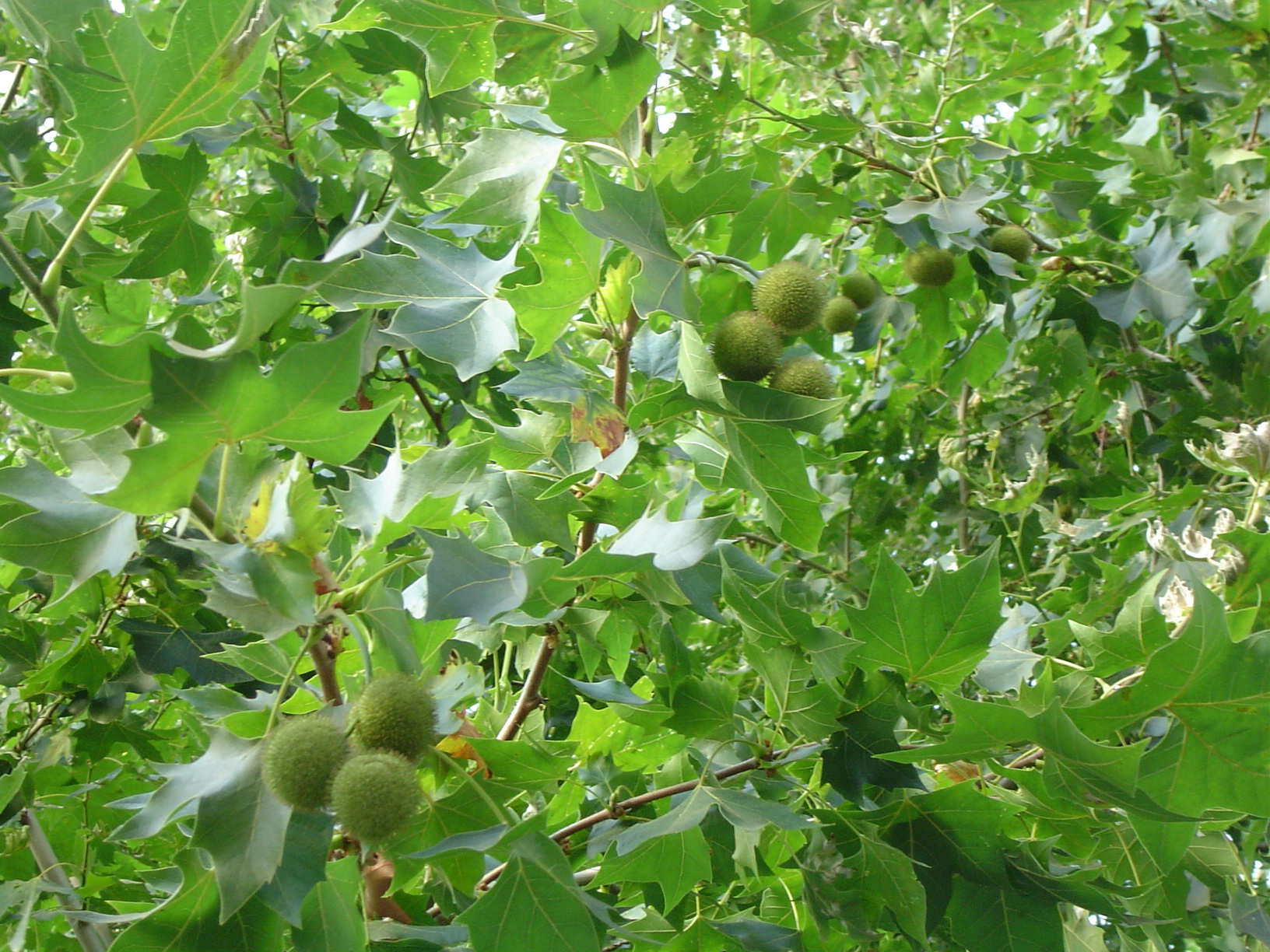
London plane in Whittier College

The species was formed by hybridization in the 17th century after P. orientalis and P. occidentalis had been planted in proximity to one another. It is most likely that the hybridization took place in Spain or southern France, as the P. occidentalis parent needs considerable summer heat to grow well and is near-impossible to grow successfully in cooler climates like Britain, but there is also speculation that it could have happened in Vauxhall Gardens in London where John Tradescant the Younger saw the tree in the mid-17th century. The leaf and flower characteristics are intermediate between the two parent species, the leaf being more deeply lobed than P. occidentalis but less so than P. orientalis, and the seed balls typically two per stem (one in P. occidentalis, 3–6 in P. orientalis). The hybrid is fertile, and seedlings are occasionally found near mature trees.

Controlled reciprocal pollinations between P. occidentalis and P. orientalis resulted in good yields of germinable seed and true hybrid seedlings. Crosses of both species, as females, with P. racemosa and P. wrightii produced extremely low yields of germinable seed, but true hybrids were obtained from all interspecific combinations. Apomixis (asexual reproduction from non-fertilized seeds) appeared common in P. orientalis.

In 1968 and 1970, Frank S. Santamour Jr. recreated the P. orientalis by P. occidentalis cross using a P. orientalis of Turkish origin with American sycamores (P. occidentalis). The offspring were evaluated following several years of exposure to anthracnose infection. Two selections, 'Columbia' and 'Liberty', were released in August 1984.

== Taxonomy ==
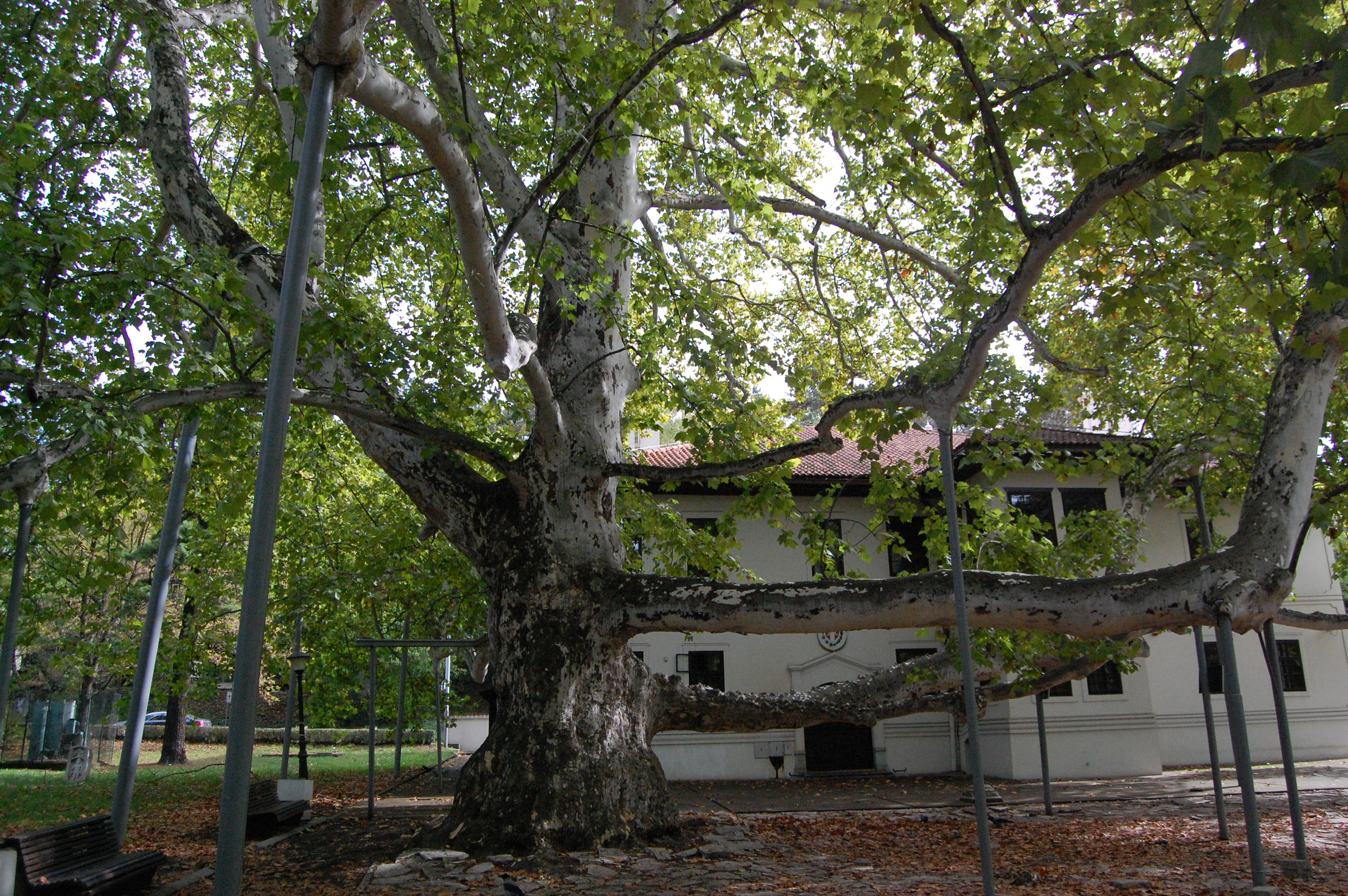
This example, Topčider Park, Belgrade, was planted in 1834.

Platanus × hispanica was first described by the German botanist Otto von Münchhausen in his 1770 work der Hausvater. Later, it was described in the botanical literature by the Scottish botanist William Aiton in his 1789 work Hortus Kewensis as a variety of P. orientalis. Aiton described this variety with a two-word Latin diagnosis, "foliis transversis", and called it the Spanish plane tree. In 1805, Carl Ludwig Willdenow chose to elevate Aiton's variety to species rank, publishing the new species P. acerifolia in the fourth edition of Species Plantarum.

== Cultivation and uses ==
Stereo image
Right frame
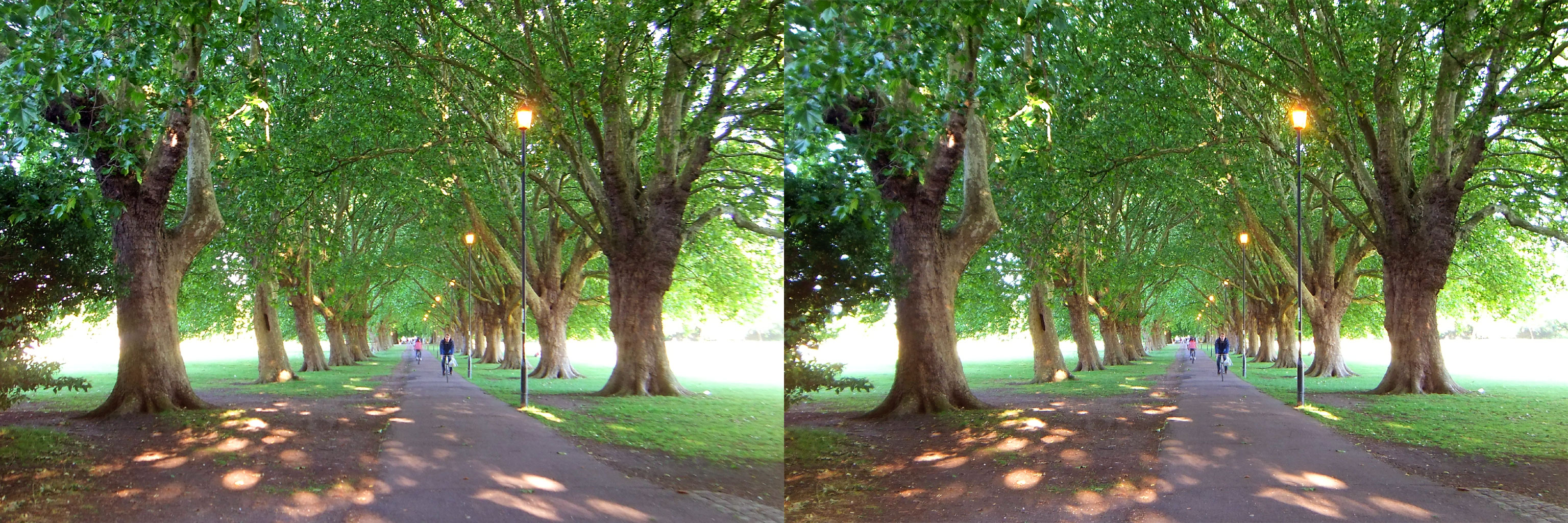
Left frame
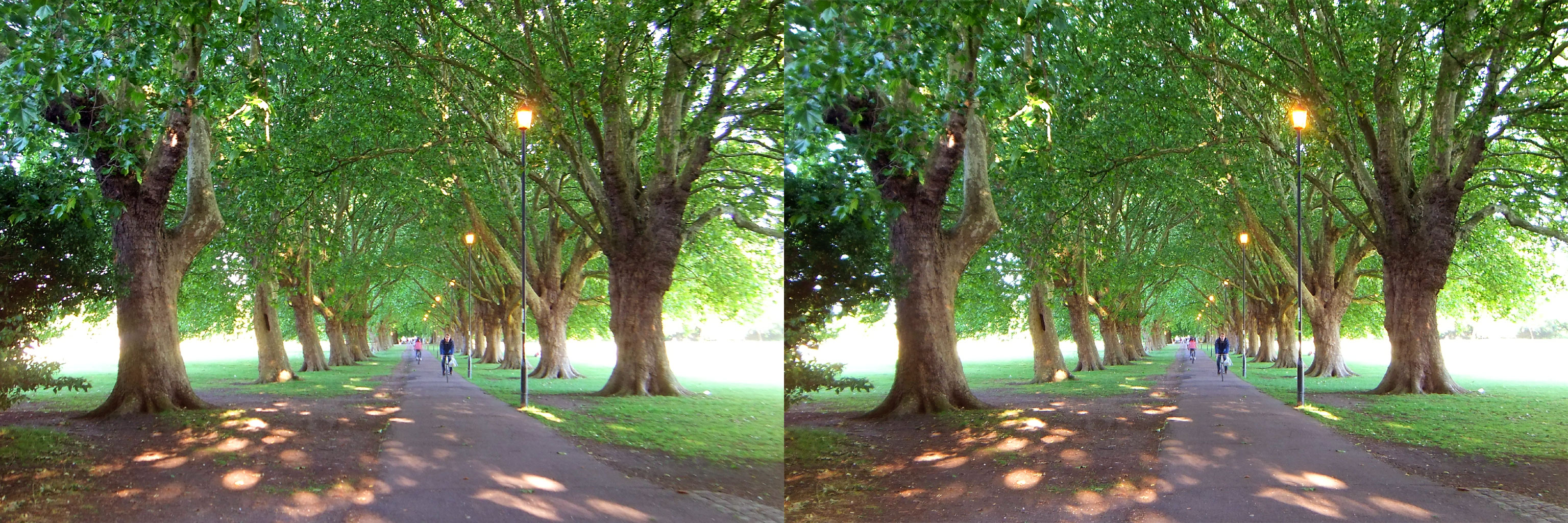
Cross-eye view
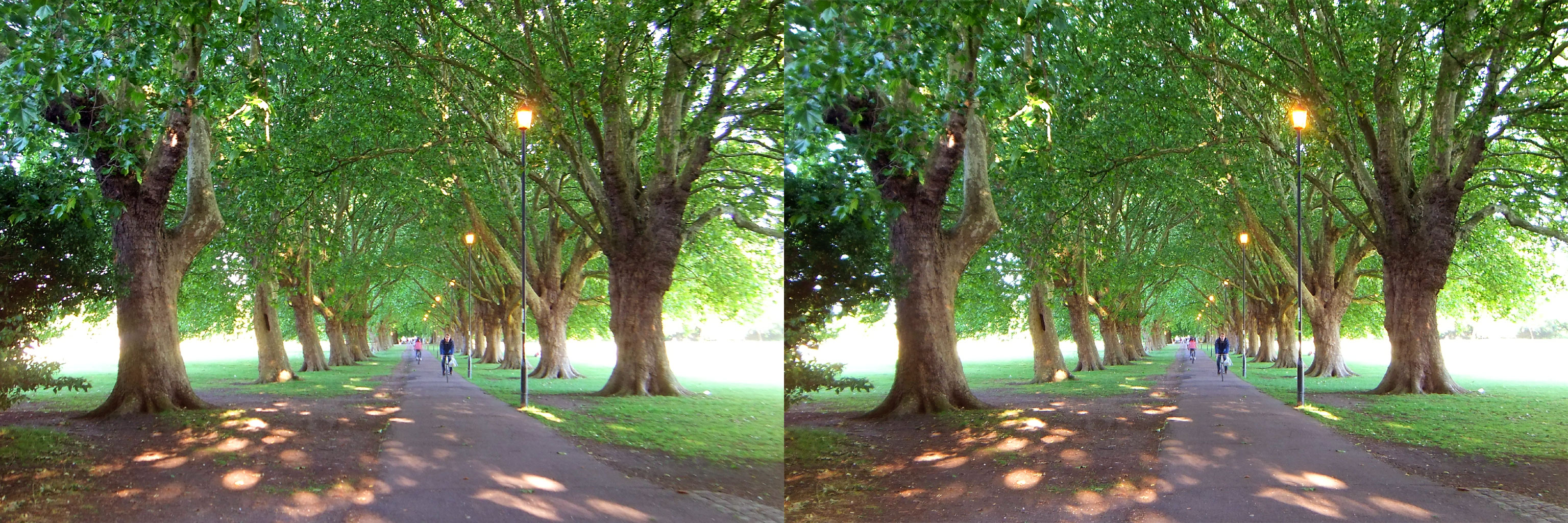
Parallel view
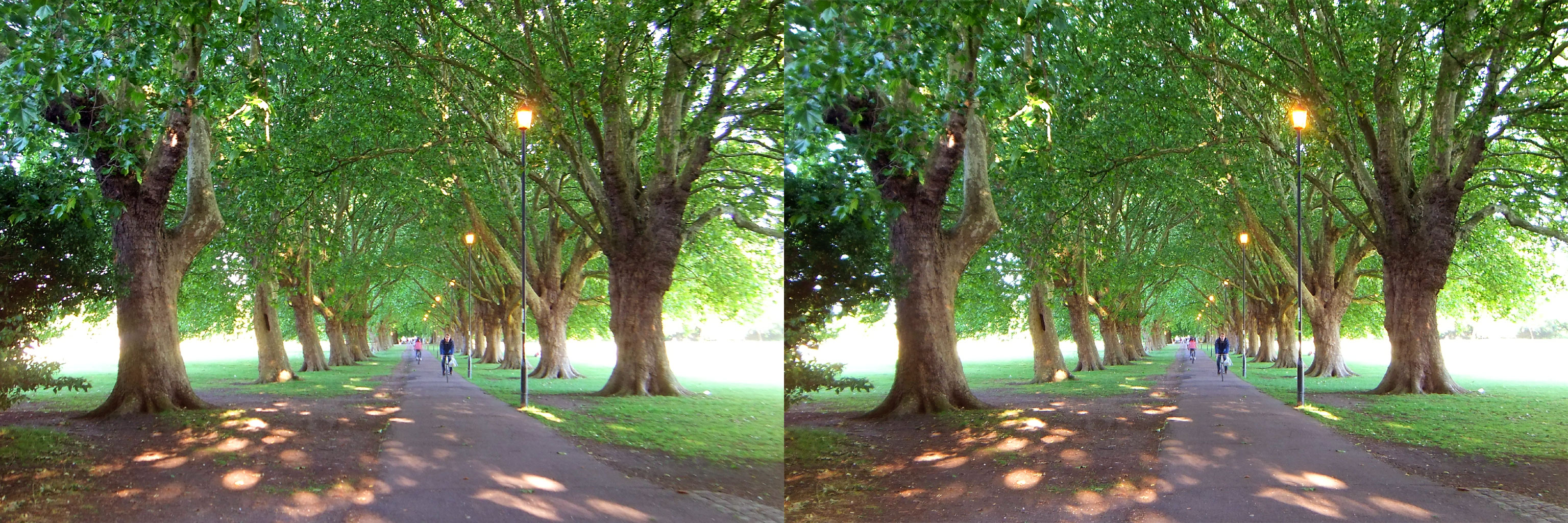

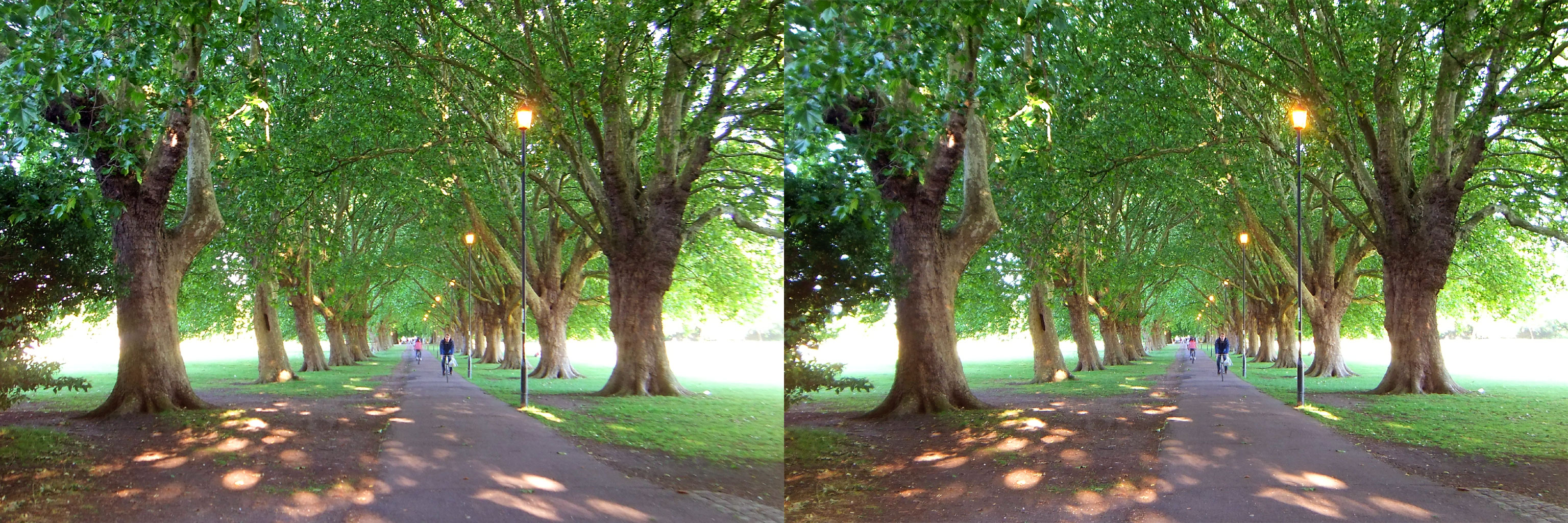
- Avenue of London plane trees on Jesus Green

The London plane is very tolerant of atmospheric pollution and root compaction, and for this reason it is a popular urban roadside tree. It was planted extensively in Victorian times to weather the pollution of London. It is now extensively cultivated in most temperate latitudes as an ornamental and parkland tree, and is a commonly planted tree in cities throughout the temperate regions of the world, in London and many other cities. It has a greater degree of winter cold tolerance than P. orientalis, and is less susceptible to anthracnose disease than P. occidentalis. The tree has gained the Royal Horticultural Society of Great Britain's Award of Garden Merit. Two of 50 "Great British Trees" that the Tree Council selected in 2002 in honour of Queen Elizabeth II's Golden Jubilee are London planes. The list specifically mentions Britain's first London plane being in the city of Ely, Cambridgeshire.

The tree is fairly wind-resistant. However, it has a number of problems in urban use, most notably the short, stiff hairs shed by the young leaves and the dispersing seeds; these are an irritant if breathed in, and can exacerbate breathing difficulties for people with asthma. The vigorous roots can also cause problems with paving in cities, making uneven surfaces with tripping hazards. The large leaves can create a disposal problem in cities, as they are tough and sometimes can take more than one year to break down if they remain whole.

London planes are often pruned by a technique called pollarding. A pollarded tree has a drastically different appearance than an unpruned tree, being much shorter with stunted, club-like branches. Although pollarding requires frequent maintenance (the trees must usually be repruned every year), it creates a distinctive shape that is often sought after in plazas, main streets, and other urban areas.

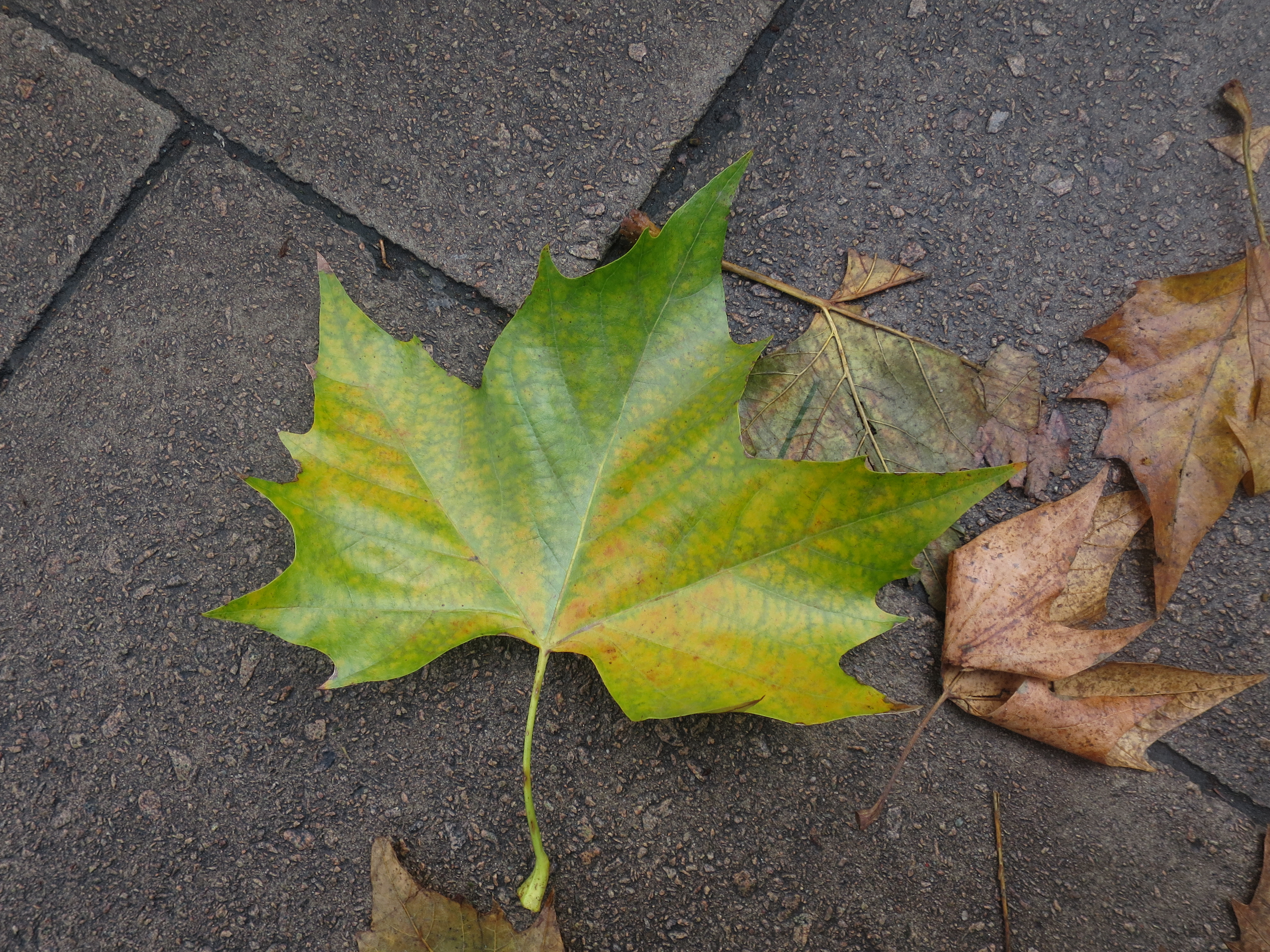
Foliage close-up seen near Westminster Abbey

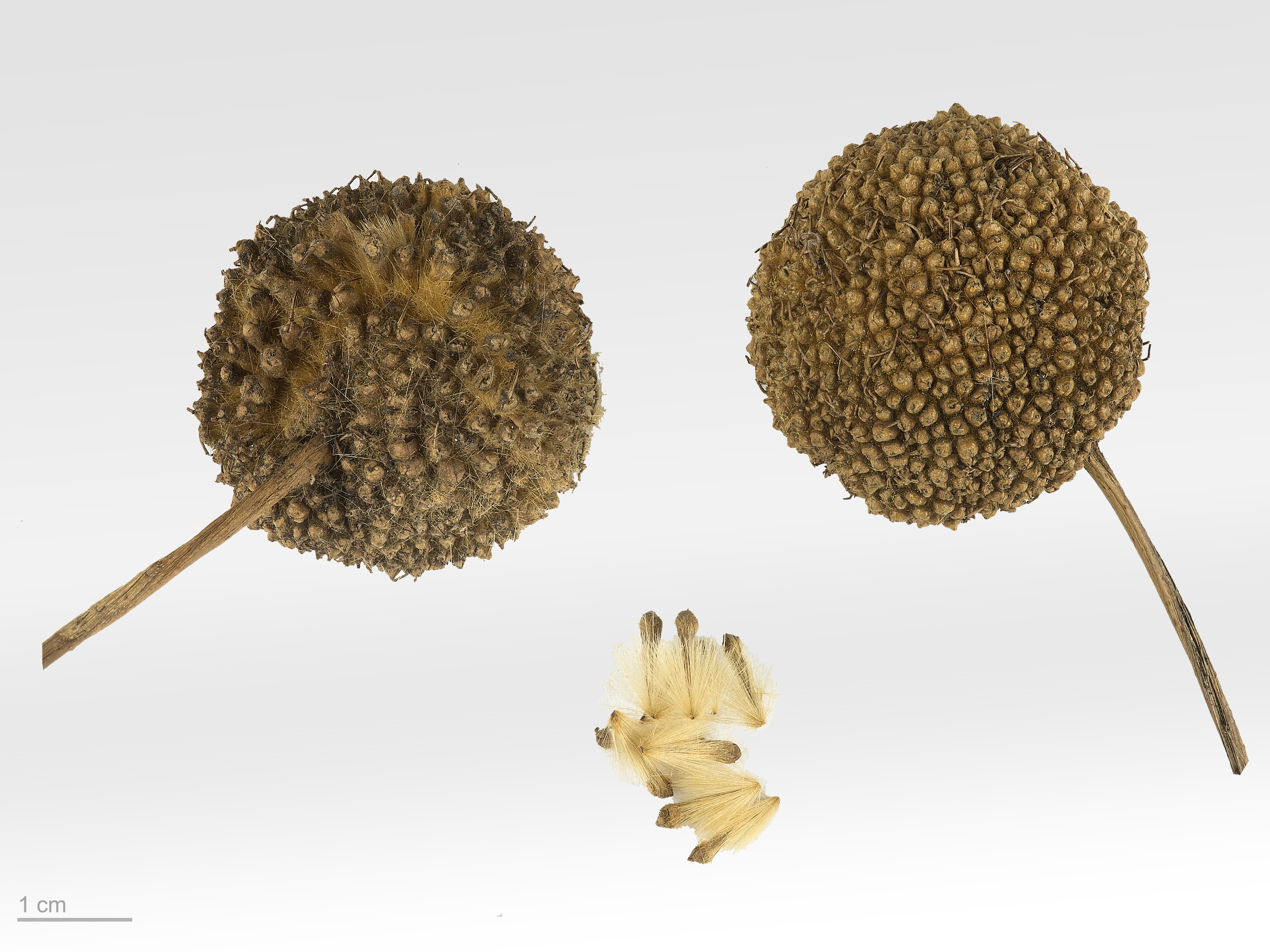
Fruit

=== In other locations ===
According to the New York City Department of Parks and Recreation the symbol of that organization is a cross between the leaf of the London plane and a maple leaf. It is prominently featured on signs and buildings in public parks across the city. The tree is on the NYC Parks Department's list of restricted use species for street tree planting, because it constitutes more than 10% of all street trees.

In Australia, the London plane is used extensively as a street tree in major cities, particularly Sydney, Melbourne, Adelaide and Perth. The tree is commonly used because of its resilience to warm weather, its benefits as a shade tree, resistance to breakage and tolerance of urban pollution.

In Johannesburg, South Africa many London planes line streets in older suburbs. In recent years the trees have been infested with the Polyphagous shot hole borer beetle (Euwallacea fornicatus). Some trees are reportedly developing resistance mechanisms but there are currently no effective measures against the borer beetle and it remains unclear how many trees will have to be cut down.

The London plane is cultivated in central, northeastern and southern China.

=== Timber ===
When quarter-sawn, the timber has a distinctive and highly decorative appearance of dark reddish-brown flecks against a lighter background and is known as lacewood.

== Cultivars ==
- 'Augustine Henry'. This is a tall growing cultivar, with very large, pale green leaves. It produces a strong leader and a cylindrical trunk.
- 'Bloodgood', This is one of the first cultivars to be selected for anthracnose resistance. It is a rounded tree with deep green leaves that turn a poor yellow in fall. The plant tolerates poor cultural conditions, including heat, drought and poor soil. Recent observations indicate susceptibility to ozone.
- 'Columbia'. Resists mildew and anthracnose, this tree has deeply lobed, dark green leaves.
- 'Liberty'. A U.S. National Arboretum introduction, this pyramidal tree grows vigorously. It shows good tolerance for mildew, anthracnose, heat and drought.
- 'Metzam' (Metroshade), A new introduction that grows strongly with a pyramidal habit, this cultivar is also said to be disease resistant with lustrous green foliage that emerges with a reddish cast.
- 'Mirkovec'. Has a dwarf, shrubby habit and unusual variegated lobed leaves with pink, cream and bronze regions.
- 'Pyramidalis'. A cultivar or cultivar group common in London, with rich glossy green leaves, and a characteristic tendency to produce straight branches, compared to sinuous ones in other forms.
- 'Suttneri'. Leaves are variegated creamy white.
- 'Yarwood'. Very resistant to powdery mildew and highly susceptible to anthracnose. Poor structure. Being abandoned in California.
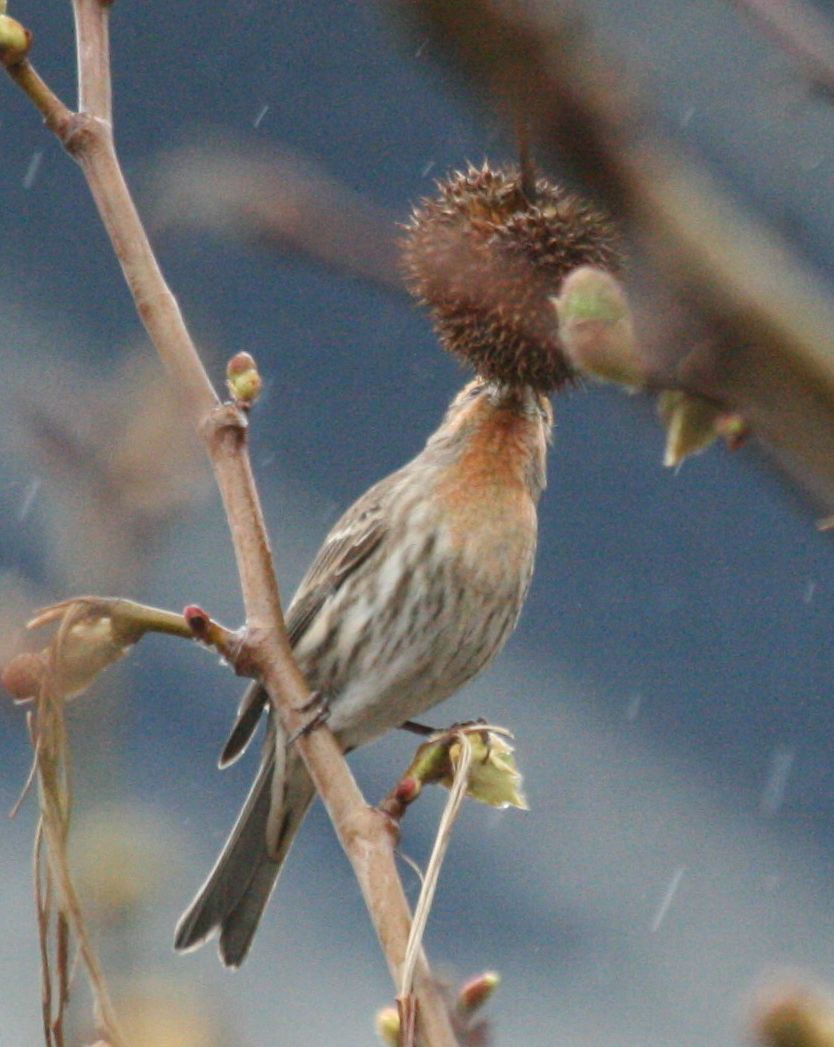
A house finch eating London plane seeds in Seattle

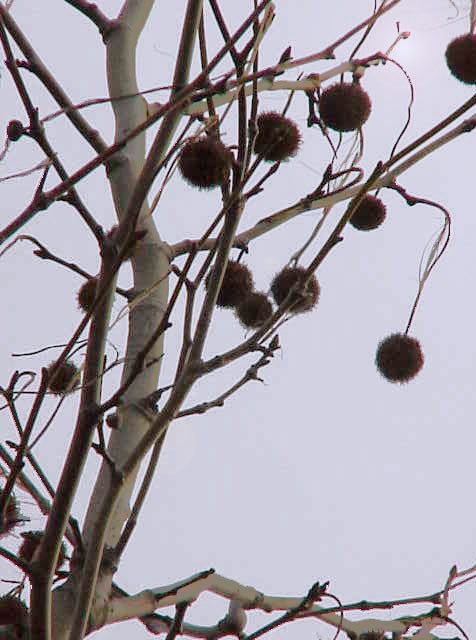
Single seed ball per stem: similar to P. occidentalis, not found in all clones

== See also ==
- Pollen
- Allergic rhinitis
