= Freiherr von Münchhausen =

Freiherr von Münchhausen may refer to:

- Hieronymus Karl Friedrich, Freiherr von Münchhausen (1720–1797), German noble storyteller
- Otto von Münchhausen (Otto Freiherr von Münchhausen) (1716–1774), German botanist
- Börries von Münchhausen (1874–1945), German poet and Nazi activist

== See also ==
- Münchhausen (disambiguation)
- Baron Munchausen, a fictional German nobleman
