= Powerlifting at the 2000 Summer Paralympics =

Powerlifting at the XI Paralympic Games
- Paralympic Powerlifting
- Venue: Downes Pavilion
- Dates: 21 to 28 October 2000
- Competitors: 258 from 67 nations

Paralympic symbol (1994-2004)

Powerlifting at the 2000 Summer Paralympics consisted of 20 events.

== Medal summary ==
=== Medal table ===
Rank	Nation	Gold	Silver	Bronze	Total
1	China (CHN)	5	2	3	10
2	Nigeria (NGR)	4	1	4	9
3	Egypt (EGY)	3	6	3	12
4	South Korea (KOR)	2	1	0	3
5	Great Britain (GBR)	2	0	1	3
6	Iran (IRI)	1	3	1	5
7	United States (USA)	1	1	0	2
8	Germany (GER)	1	0	0	1
8	Russia (RUS)	1	0	0	1
10	Mexico (MEX)	0	2	1	3
11	Thailand (THA)	0	1	1	2
11	Ukraine (UKR)	0	1	1	2
13	Australia (AUS)	0	1	0	1
13	France (FRA)	0	1	0	1
15	Chinese Taipei (TPE)	0	0	1	1
15	Libya (LBA)	0	0	1	1
15	Netherlands (NED)	0	0	1	1
15	Philippines (PHI)	0	0	1	1
15	South Africa (RSA)	0	0	1	1
Totals (19 entries)		20	20	20	60

=== Participating nations ===
- Algeria (2)
- Armenia (1)
- Australia (13)
- Austria (1)
- Azerbaijan (3)
- Bahrain (1)
- Belarus (1)
- Brazil (3)
- Burkina Faso (1)
- Canada (2)
- Chile (2)
- China (18)
- Chinese Taipei (8)
- Ecuador (1)
- Egypt (19)
- Finland (2)
- France (8)
- Germany (3)
- Great Britain (8)
- Greece (2)
- Hungary (2)
- India (2)
- Indonesia (1)
- Individual Paralympic Athletes (1)
- Iran (7)
- Israel (1)
- Japan (1)
- Jordan (3)
- Kazakhstan (1)
- Kenya (1)
- Kuwait (5)
- Kyrgyzstan (2)
- Laos (2)
- Libya (2)
- Malaysia (5)
- Mali (1)
- Mauritania (1)
- Mexico (9)
- Morocco (5)
- Netherlands (2)
- New Zealand (2)
- Nigeria (18)
- Norway (2)
- Oman (2)
- Pakistan (1)
- Papua New Guinea (1)
- Peru (1)
- Philippines (1)
- Poland (9)
- Qatar (2)
- Romania (1)
- Russia (10)
- Slovakia (3)
- South Africa (2)
- South Korea (6)
- Spain (1)
- Sri Lanka (1)
- Sweden (1)
- Syria (4)
- Thailand (6)
- Tunisia (1)
- Turkmenistan (1)
- Ukraine (8)
- United Arab Emirates (2)
- United States (12)
- Venezuela (6)
- Vietnam (1)

== Events ==
=== Men's events ===
Event	Gold	Silver	Bronze
−48 kg	Anthony Peddle; Great Britain	Jung Yong Kwak; South Korea	Thongsa Marasri; Thailand
−52 kg	Keum Jong Jung; South Korea	Osama El Sernegawy; Egypt	Jian Wang; China
−56 kg	Gomma G. Ahmed; Egypt	Fereydoun Karimipour; Iran	Stephen Davou; Nigeria
−60 kg	Metwaly Mathana; Egypt	Richard Nicholson; Australia	Taqy Parnian; Netherlands
−67.5 kg	Monday Emoghavwe; Nigeria	Shaban Ibrahim; Egypt	Allahbakhsh Akbari; Iran
−75 kg	Hai Dong Zhang; China	Mansour Dimasi; Iran	El Sayed Abd El Aal; Egypt
−82.5 kg	Jong Chul Park; South Korea	Saeid Bafandeh; Iran	Mostafa Hamed; Egypt
−90 kg	Bernd Vogel; Germany	Abd Elmonem Farag; Egypt	Ya Dong Wu; China
−100 kg	Amrollah Dehghani; Iran	Sherif Bakr; Egypt	Nicholas Slater; Great Britain
+100 kg	Pernell Cooper; United States	Kim Brownfield; United States	Abdelrahim Hamed; Libya

=== Women's events ===
Event	Gold	Silver	Bronze
−40 kg	Bian Jianxin; China	Lidiya Solovyova; Ukraine	Laura Cerero Gabriel; Mexico
−44 kg	Fatma Omar; Egypt	Lucy Ejike; Nigeria	Li Hua Lu; Chinese Taipei
−48 kg	Iyabo Ismaila; Nigeria	Abir Ibrahim Aly Nail; Egypt	Xia Zhang; China
−52 kg	Tamara Popdalnaia; Russia	Amalia Perez; Mexico	Patricia Nnaji; Nigeria
−56 kg	Taoying Fu; China	Somkhoun Anon; Thailand	Moekie Grobbelaar; South Africa
−60 kg	Victoria Nneji; Nigeria	Yu Zuo; China	Lyudmyla Osmanova; Ukraine
−67.5 kg	Patricia Okafor; Nigeria	Mingxia Zhu; China	Nadia Ali; Egypt
−75 kg	Rui Fang Li; China	Patricia Barcenas; Mexico	Kike Adedeji Ogunbamowo; Nigeria
−82.5 kg	Emma Brown; Great Britain	Hend Abd Elaty; Egypt	Adeline Dumapong; Philippines
+82.5 kg	Ping Cao; China	Carine Burgy; France	Faith Igbinehin; Nigeria
