= Nigeria at the 1992 Summer Paralympics =

- IPC code: NGR
- NPC: Nigeria Paralympic Committee

in Barcelona
- Competitors: 6
- Medals Ranked 36th: Gold 3 Silver 0 Bronze 0 Total 3

Summer Paralympics appearances (overview)
- 1992; 1996; 2000; 2004; 2008; 2012; 2016; 2020; 2024

Nigeria competed at the 1992 Summer Paralympics in Barcelona, Spain, making their Paralympic debut. 6 competitors from Nigeria won 3 medals, all gold, and so finished 33rd the medal table. They competed in athletics, table tennis and powerlifting. Adeoye Ajibola was the country's big success story of these Games, going on to represent Nigeria in non-disability athletics and coming within a second of the men's non-disability 100m world record. Monday Emoghawve was the country's other gold medal winner in Barcelona, claiming gold in men's powerlifting.

== Background ==
In many parts of Black Africa, people who have disabilities that include insanity, and physical disabilities such as impairments and deformities often face cultural barriers to participation because of attitudes related to their disabilities. These include beliefs that they acquired their disabilities because their parents were witches or they are wizards. Their disability is often seen as a result of a personal failing on their part. As such, there is often tremendous cultural pressure for people with physical disabilities to remain hidden and out of the public eye. In many places, they are perceived to be monsters in need of healing. This is the context to which Nigerian Paralympians engage both society and sport internally, in their own country.

== Team ==
The 1992 Games were Nigeria's debut Games. The country sent a six sportspeople strong delegation to Barcelona. All members of the team were men. The team included athletics competitor Adeoye Ajibola, powerlifters Monday Emoghawve and Patrick Akutaekwe, table tennis players Aden Bamgbose, Nasiru Sule, Ibrahim Murtala and Segun Toriola.

== Medals ==
Nigeria won three gold medals at the 1992 Summer Paralympics.

Medal	Name	Sport	Event
Gold	Adeoye Ajibola	Athletics	Men's 100 m TS4
Gold	Adeoye Ajibola	Athletics	Men's 200 m TS4
Gold	Monday Emoghawve	Powerlifting	Men's Up To 48 kg

== Athletics ==
Adeoye Ajibola won two gold medals in sprint events. Ajibola posted a DNS in heat 1 of the Men's 100 m TS4 event, before going on to the final where he set a world record time of 10.72 seconds to finish first. A single-arm amputee, when his time is corrected for his disability, it would have been 10.05 seconds. Assuming he had no disability, his time would have given him a fourth-place finish at the 1992 Summer Olympics. His time would be a little more than a second slower than the record for the men's non-disability 100m, which was 9.84 seconds and set by Canadian Donavan Bailey at the 1996 Summer Olympics. In semi-final of heat 1 of the Men's 200 m TS4 event, he posted a world record time of 22.18 seconds in finishing first. In the final, he bettered his own just set world record, posting a time of 21.83 seconds to claim his second gold. Ajibola would later go on to represent Nigeria in able-bodied competition.

== Powerlifting ==
Nigeria competed in powerlifting at the Barcelona Games, making their Paralympic debut in the sport. They were the only African country competing in the sport in 1992.

The country had two representatives, Monday Emoghawve, and Patrick Akutaekwe. Emoghawve won gold in a thirteen deep field in the Men's Up To 48 kg event with a world record lift of 165 kg. Akutaekwe finished fifth in the Men's Up To 100 kg with a best lift of 180 kg, well behind the Paralympic Record of 200 kg set by gold medalist Krzysztof Palubicki of Poland.

== Table tennis ==
Nigeria was represented in table tennis by Nasiru Sule, Ibrahim Murtala, and Aden Bamgbose.

In the 1/64th round of the Men's Open 1–5, Bamgbose met Great Britain's Evan Martins, defeating him 2 - 0 and allowing Bamgbose to advance to the 1/32 final. There, he went up against Switzerland's Ignaz Casutt, whom he also beat 2 - 0 to advance to the 1/16th finals. He lost 0 - 2 in that round to Austria's Franz Mandl. Bamgbose also competed in the Men's Singles 2 event. In Group C with Austria's Gerhard Scharf, Ireland's Ronan Rooney, American Gary Blanks and Venezuela's Humberto Linares, Bamgbose, posted 2 wins and 2 losses, winning 2 - 0 against the American and Venezuelan.

Murtala met American Diego Bolanos in the 1/64th round of the Men's Open 1–5, winning 2 - 0 to advance to the next round. There, he lost 2 - 1 to higher seeded French player Daniel Hatton. Murtala also competed in Men's Singles 4. He was put into Group C with Belgium's Dimitri Ghion, Austria's Franz Mandl, France's Christophe Pinna and American Charles Focht. He had a 2 - 2 record in group play, with wins against France and the United States.

Sule opened his Paralympic Games against Spain's Francisco Jodar, defeating him 2 - 0 to advance to the 1/32 final. He then defeated Sweden's Jan-Krister Gustavsson 2 - 1. In the 1/16th round, Sule then dispatched Hong Kong's Sui Lam Ip 0 - 2 to make it into the 1/8ths final of the Men's Open 1–5. He continued his winning streak against Austria's Leo Hochrathner 2 - 0. Meeting France's Guy Tisserant in the next round, Sule was then eliminated after losing 0 - 2 to the eventual gold medalist. Sule also competed in the Men's Singles 5 event. He was in Group B with Sweden's Ernst Bollden and Spain's Francisco Jodar. He won both his matches in group play. This qualified him for the elimination round. He beat Austria's Leo Hochrathner 0 - 2 in the 1/8th final. He then lost 2 - 0 to Spain's Manuel Robles in the quarterfinal.

Nigeria had a team in the Men's Teams 5 event. It included Bamgbose, Murtala and Sule. They were in Group B with Sweden and Great Britain. They finished with a pair of wins, beating Sweden 3 - 2 and beating Great Britain 3 - 1. They played South Korea in the Quarterfinals, losing 3 - 0.

== See also ==
- Nigeria at the Paralympics
- Nigeria at the 1992 Summer Olympics
