= Münchhausen =

Münchhausen or Munchausen may refer to:

- Hieronymus Karl Friedrich, Freiherr von Münchhausen (1720–1797) a German nobleman whose adventurous life was later fictionalized in literature and film
- Münchhausen, a German noble family
- Münchhausen (surname), a German surname
- Münchhausen am Christenberg, a German town
- Munchhausen, Bas-Rhin, a commune in Bas-Rhin, France
- 14014 Münchhausen, a main belt asteroid
- Münchhausen (1943 film), a German fantasy-comedy film
- Munchausen (2014 film), an American silent short horror film

== See also ==
- Freiherr von Münchhausen (disambiguation)
- Munchausen syndrome, a psychiatric disorder named after Baron Münchausen
  - Munchausen syndrome by proxy
  - Munchausen by Internet
- Münchhausen trilemma in epistemology
- Meet the Baron, 1933 MGM comedy featuring Baron Von Munchausen
- The Adventures of Baron Munchausen, 1988 movie co-written and directed by Terry Gilliam
