= Emma Brown (powerlifter) =

British Paralympic powerlifter

Personal information
- Full name: Emma Brown
- Nationality: British
- Born: 17 September 1979 (age 46)

Sport
- Country: United Kingdom
- Sport: Powerlifting
- Event: 82kg

Achievements and titles
- Paralympic finals: 2000-2004
Medal record
Representing United Kingdom
Women's powerlifting
Paralympic Games
Gold medal – first place	2000 Sydney	−82 kg
Gold medal – first place	2004 Athens	−82 kg

Emma Brown (born 18 September 1979) is a retired British Paralympic powerlifter who won gold medals at the 2000 and 2004 Summer Paralympics.

== Personal life ==
Brown was born in Gravesend, Kent, England to Welsh Parents. Brown is a full-time wheelchair user as she cannot walk as a result of being born with spina bifida. She has lived in Tonteg, South Wales. She has appeared twice (1999-2000 and again in 2014) on Countdown, and appeared on Deal or No Deal in June 2009.

== Powerlifting career ==
Previous to powerlifting Brown participated in other sports such as track and field (especially archery). On one occasion the weather was so atrocious that the teams decided to go in watch some of the indoor sports. So she decided to have a go at powerlifting at Stoke Mandeville and set a British record with her first lift. Emma has said many times in interviews that she preferred the sport because it was indoors and out of the weather!

At the 2000 Summer Paralympics hosted by Sydney, Australia, she lifted 132.5 kg to win the gold medal in the women's up to 82.5 kg event. As the sport was making its Games debut she became the first British woman to win a Paralympic powerlifting gold medal.

She competed at her second Paralympics at the 2004 Games held in Athens, Greece. She successfully defended her title in the women's up to 82.5 kg competition; she lifted a total of 130 kg, tied with French lifter Carine Burgy, but won the gold medal based on her lower body weight.

In addition to her Paralympic games medals Brown won World Championship gold medals in 1998 and 2002 as well as six European titles in 1995, 1997, 1999, 2001, 2003 and 2005.

Injury forced her to retire from competitive powerlifting in 2007.
