= Żelazno, Lower Silesian Voivodeship =

Historical village in Poland

Żelazno
- Village
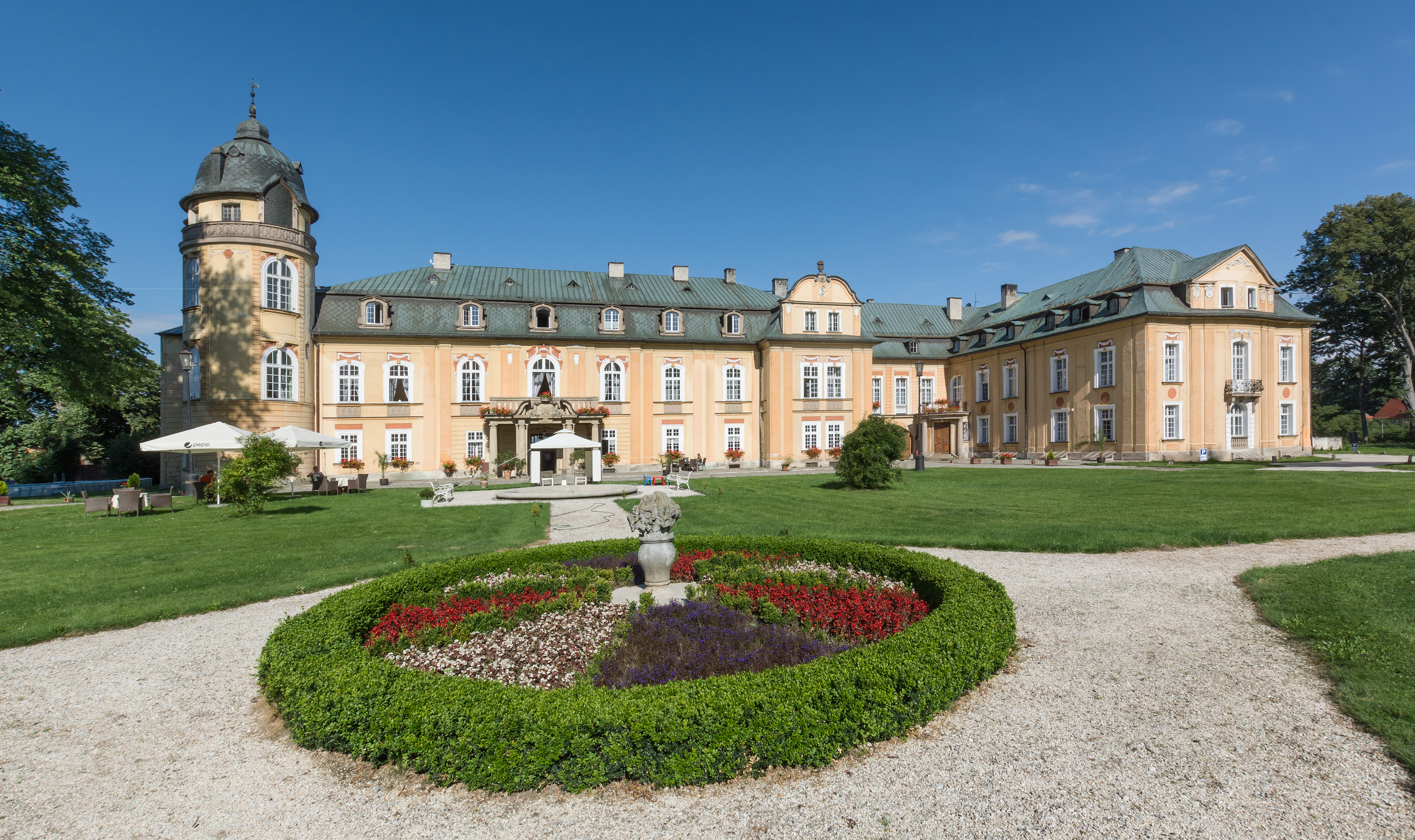
- Żelazno Palace

- Location within Poland
- Coordinates: 50°22′36″N 16°40′15″E
- Country: Poland
- Voivodeship: Lower Silesian
- County: Kłodzko
- Gmina: Kłodzko
- Highest elevation: 350 m (1,150 ft)

Population
  - Total: 973
- Postal code: 57-361

Żelazno (Polish pronunciation: [ʐɛˈlaznɔ]) is a historical village in the administrative district of Gmina Kłodzko, within Kłodzko County, Lower Silesian Voivodeship, in south-western Poland. The population as of 2017 is 973.

== History ==
The history of Żelazno/Eisersdorf goes back to the 13th century when it was part of an ancient trade route called the Amber Road. The settlement was first mentioned as Eyserzdorf in 1326. The settlement's prosperous medieval history left its legacy, which can be seen to this day. The village also features a 15th-century Gothic tower, an 18th-century palace and a manor house that once belonged to the famous Münchhausen aristocratic family. The village was at various times under Polish, Czech, Austrian and German rule, before it became again part of Poland after Germany's defeat in World War II in 1945.

== Gallery ==
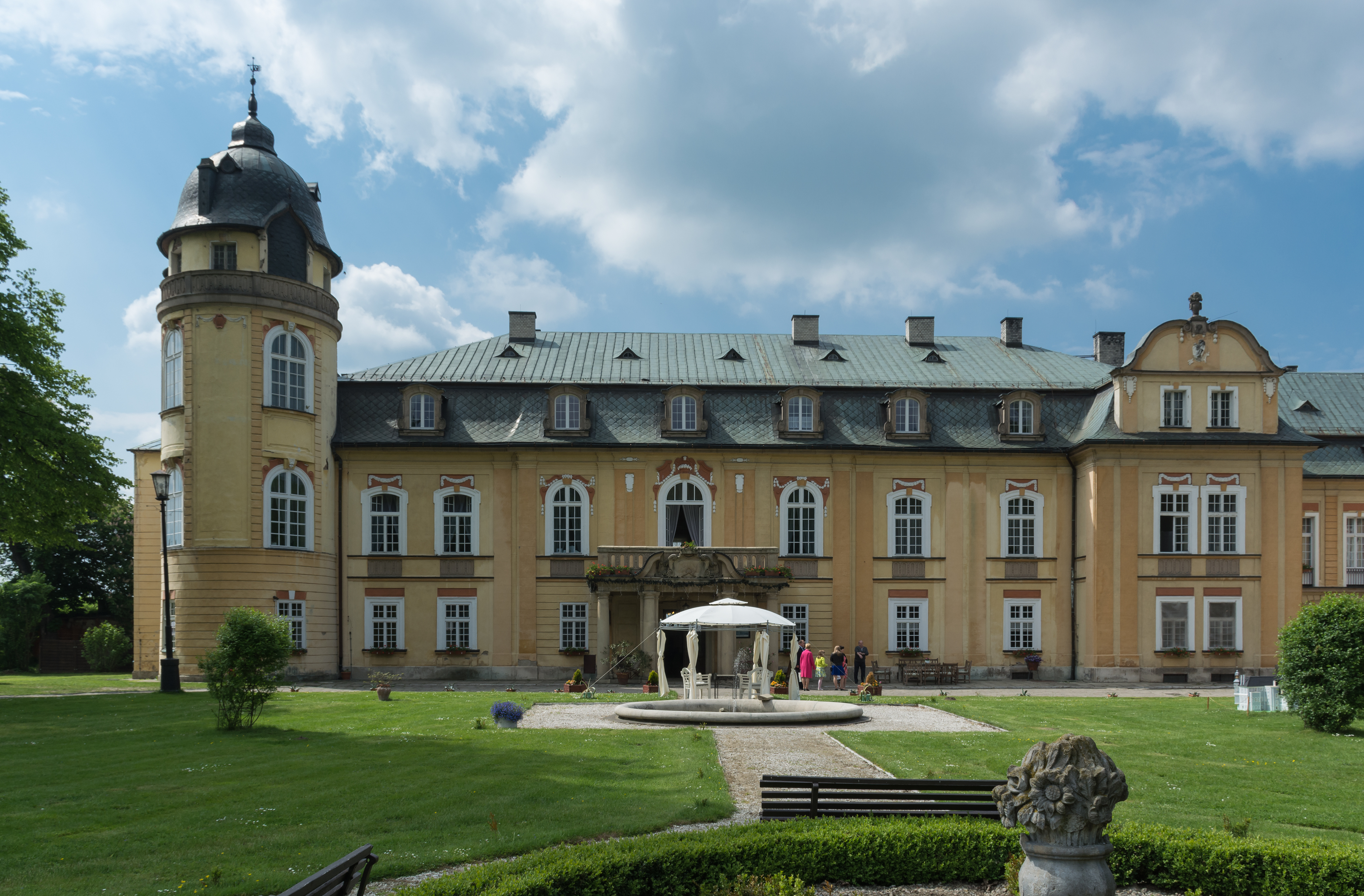
Żelazno Palace

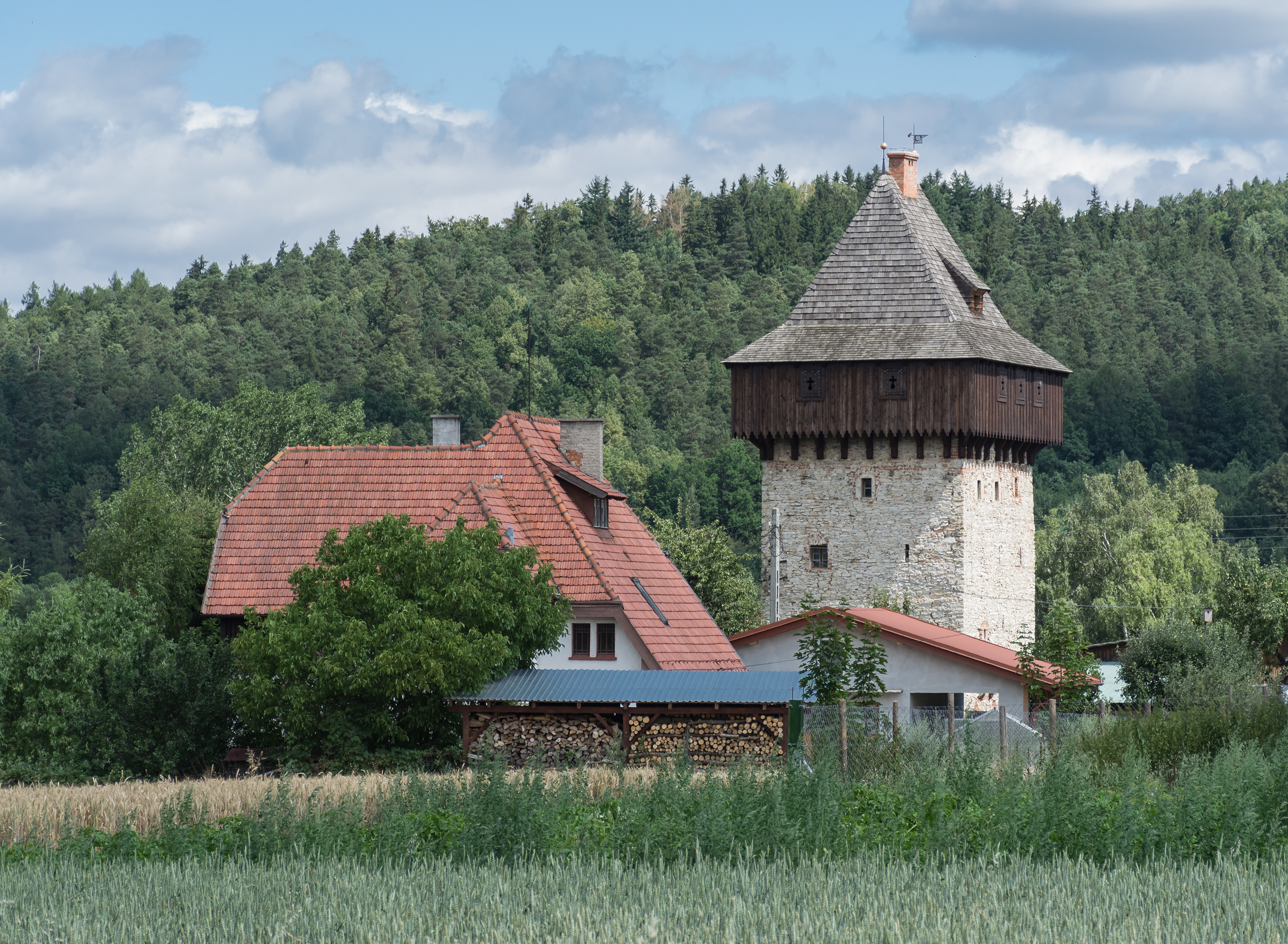
15th-century medieval tower

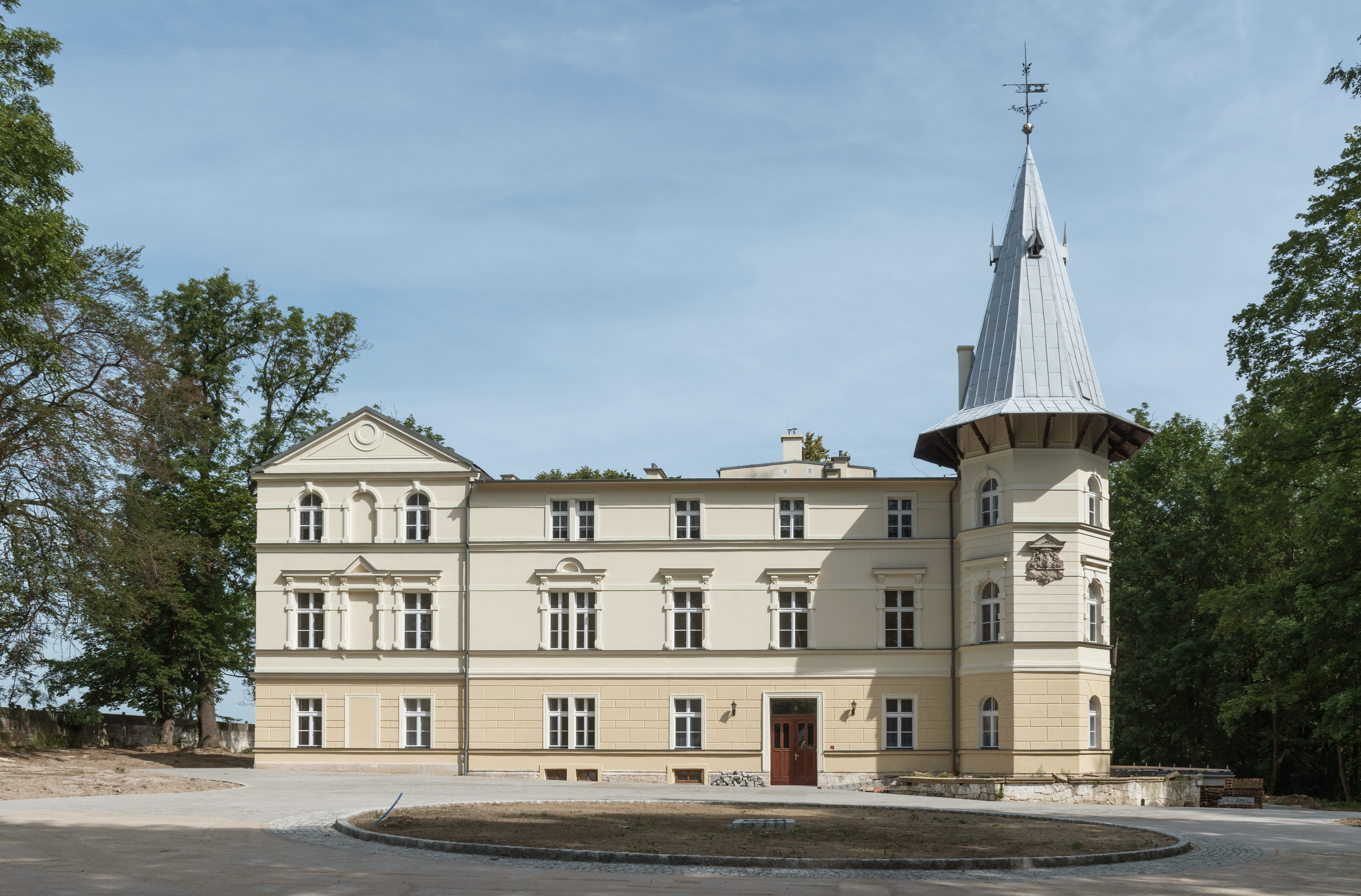
Manor house of the Münchhausens

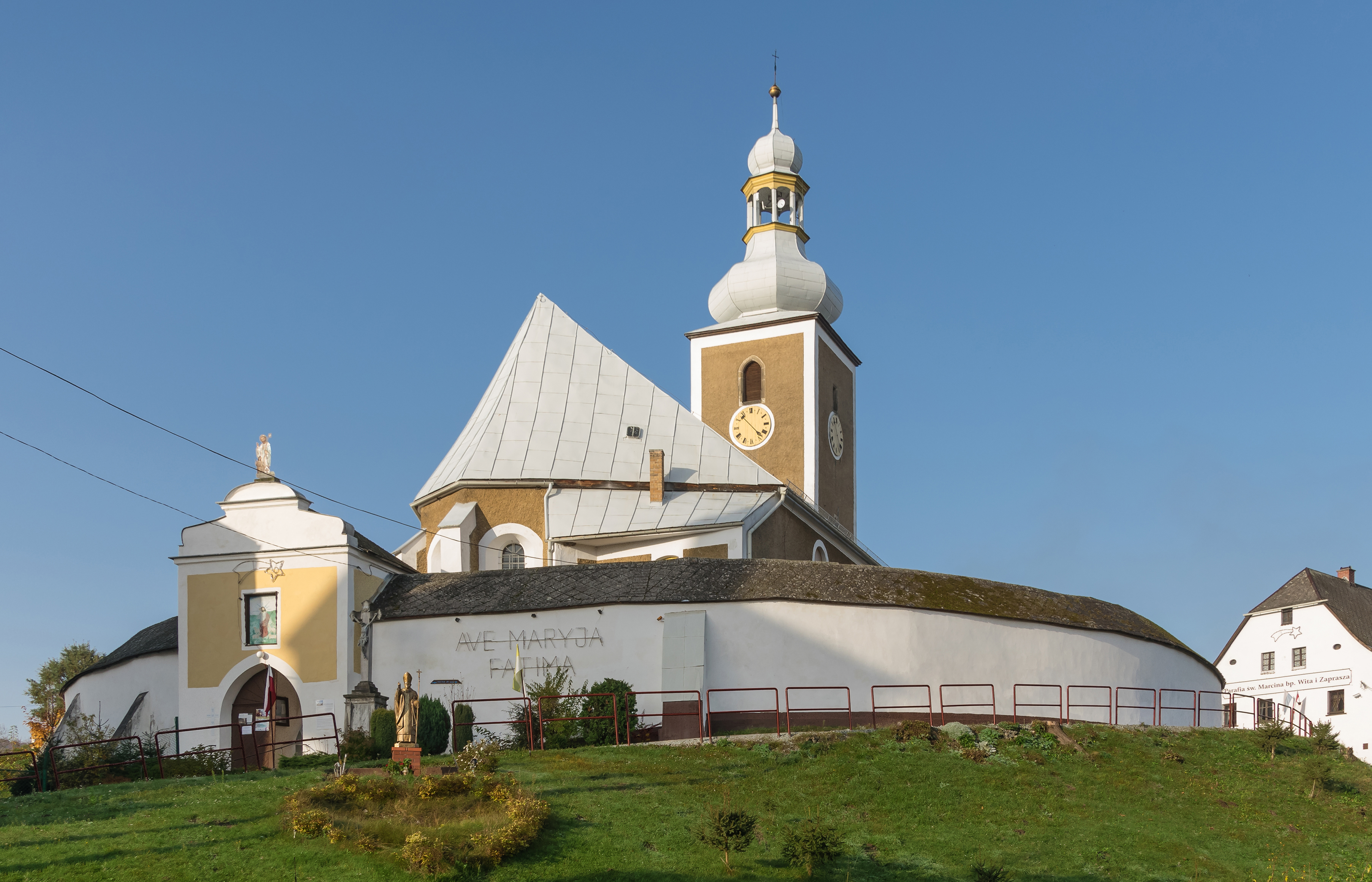
Fortified church of St. Martin
