= Powerlifting at the 2004 Summer Paralympics – Women's 82.5 kg =

Women's Up To 82.5 kg at the XII Paralympic Games
- Paralympic Powerlifting
- Venue: Nikaia Olympic Weightlifting Hall
- Dates: 25 September 2004
- Competitors: 7 from 7 nations
- Winning weight(kg): 130.0

Medalists
| 1st place, gold medalist(s) | | Emma Brown | Great Britain |
| 2nd place, silver medalist(s) | | Carine Burgy | France |
| 3rd place, bronze medalist(s) | | Hend Abd Elaty | Egypt |

The Women's 82.5 kg powerlifting event at the 2004 Summer Paralympics was competed on 25 September. It was won by Emma Brown, representing Great Britain.

== Final round ==
25 Sept. 2004, 13:45

| Rank | Athlete | Weight(kg) | Notes |
|---|---|---|---|
| 1st place, gold medalist(s) | Emma Brown (GBR) | 130.0 | |
| 2nd place, silver medalist(s) | Carine Burgy (FRA) | 130.0 | |
| 3rd place, bronze medalist(s) | Hend Abd Elaty (EGY) | 122.5 | |
| 4 | Li Fengmei (CHN) | 122.5 | |
| 5 | Dora Nelly Lopez Hilerio (MEX) | 95.0 | |
| | Mary Stack (USA) | NMR | |
| | Maria Suska (POL) | NMR | |
