= Patrick Akutaekwe =

Nigerian powerlifter

Sport
- Country: Nigeria
- Sport: Paralympic powerlifting
Medal record
Men's powerlifting
Representing Nigeria
Paralympic Games
| Bronze medal – third place | 1996 Atlanta | 100 kg |

Patrick Akutaekwe is a Nigerian powerlifter. He represented Nigeria at the 1992 Summer Paralympics held in Barcelona, Spain, at the 1996 Summer Paralympics held in Atlanta, United States and at the 2000 Summer Paralympics held in Sydney, Australia. He won the bronze medal in the men's 100 kg event at the 1996 Summer Paralympics.
