= Leszek Hallmann =

Polish Paralympic powerlifter (died 2019)

Sport
- Country: Poland
- Sport: Paralympic powerlifting
Medal record
Paralympic Games
Silver medal – second place	1996 Atlanta	+100 kg

Leszek Hallmann was a Polish Paralympic powerlifter. He won the silver medal in the men's +100 kg event at the 1996 Summer Paralympics held in Atlanta, Georgia, United States.

He also competed at the 2000 Summer Paralympics in Sydney, Australia and the 2004 Summer Paralympics in Athens, Greece.

He died in January 2019.
