= Nigeria at the 1996 Summer Paralympics =

- IPC code: NGR
- NPC: Nigeria Paralympic Committee

in Atlanta
- Competitors: 8 (8 men)
- Medals Ranked 35th: Gold 3 Silver 2 Bronze 3 Total 8

Summer Paralympics appearances (overview)
- 1992; 1996; 2000; 2004; 2008; 2012; 2016; 2020; 2024

8 male athletes from Nigeria competed at the 1996 Summer Paralympics in Atlanta, United States.

== Background ==
In many parts of Africa, people with physical and mental disabilities face widespread stigma. Examples include beliefs that they acquired their disabilities because their parents were witches or they are wizards; there is often intense cultural pressure for people with physical disabilities to remain hidden and out of the public eye. In many places, they are perceived to be monsters in need of healing. This is the context to which Nigerian Paralympians engage both society and sport internally, in their own country.

== Medals ==
The Nigerian Paralympic delegation left the Games having won more medals than their Olympic counterparts. Adeoye Ajibola would later go on to represent Nigeria in able-bodied competition.

Medal	Name	Sport	Event
Gold	Adeoye Ajibola	Athletics	Men's 100m T45-46
Gold	Adeoye Ajibola	Athletics	Men's 200m T45-46
Gold	Monday Emoghavwe	Powerlifting	Men's 60kg
Silver	Adeoye Ajibola	Athletics	Men's long jump F45-46
Silver	Abraham Obaretin	Powerlifting	Men's 48kg
Bronze	Johnson Sulola	Powerlifting	Men's 52kg
Bronze	Patrick Akutaekwe	Powerlifting	Men's 100kg
Bronze	Nasiru Sule	Table tennis	Women's open 1-5

== Athletics ==
Adeoye Ajibola won three medals in athletics.

== Powerlifting ==
Monday Emoghavwe, Abraham Obaretin, Johnson Sulola and Patrick Akutaekwe won a medal in powerlifting.

== See also ==
- Nigeria at the Paralympics
- Nigeria at the 1996 Summer Olympics
