= Abraham Obaretin =

Nigerian Paralympic powerlifter

Sport
- Country: Nigeria
- Sport: Paralympic powerlifting
Medal record
Paralympic Games
Silver medal – second place	1996 Atlanta	48 kg

Abraham Obaretin is a Nigerian Paralympic powerlifter. He represented Nigeria at the 1996 Summer Paralympics held in Atlanta, United States and at the 2000 Summer Paralympics held in Sydney, Australia. He won the silver medal in the men's 48 kg event in 1996.
