= Carine Burgy =

French Paralympic powerlifter

Personal information
- Born: 19 May 1970 (age 56) Colmar, France

Sport
- Country: France
- Sport: Paralympic powerlifting
- Retired: 2011
Medal record
Women's Paralympic powerlifting
Representing France
Paralympic Games
Silver medal – second place	2000 Sydney	+82.5kg
Silver medal – second place	2004 Athens	+82.5kg
World Championships
Silver medal – second place	2002 Kuala Lumpur	+82.5kg
Bronze medal – third place	1998 Dubai	+82.5kg
European Championships
Gold medal – first place	1997 Slovakia	+82.5kg
Gold medal – first place	1999 Budapest	+82.5kg

Carine Burgy (born 19 May 1970) is a retired French Paralympic powerlifter. Burgy won two silver medals in powerlifting at three Games, two-time World Championship medalist and a double European champion.

Burgy is an active member of the French Federation of Youth and Sports, recognised as a Knight in the National Order of Merit in 2000 and an Officer of the National Order of Merit in 2004.
