= Faith Igbinehin =

Nigerian Paralympic powerlifter

Sport
- Country: Nigeria
- Sport: Paralympic powerlifting
Medal record
Paralympic Games
Bronze medal – third place	2000 Sydney	+82.5 kg

Faith Igbinehi is a Nigerian Paralympic powerlifter. She represented Nigeria at the 2000 Summer Paralympics held in Sydney, Australia and she won the bronze medal in the women's +82.5 kg event.
