= Powerlifting at the 1996 Summer Paralympics =

Powerlifting at the X Paralympic Games
- Paralympic Powerlifting
- Competitors: 141 from 56 nations

Paralympic symbol (1994–2004)

Powerlifting at the 1996 Summer Paralympics consisted of ten men's events.

== Medal table ==
Rank	Nation	Gold	Silver	Bronze	Total
1	China (CHN)	2	1	1	4
1	South Korea (KOR)	2	1	1	4
3	Poland (POL)	2	1	0	3
4	Egypt (EGY)	1	4	1	6
5	Nigeria (NGR)	1	1	2	4
6	United States (USA)	1	0	1	2
7	Germany (GER)	1	0	0	1
8	Iran (IRI)	0	1	2	3
9	Australia (AUS)	0	1	0	1
10	Great Britain (GBR)	0	0	1	1
10	Norway (NOR)	0	0	1	1
Totals (11 entries)		10	10	10	30

=== Participating nations ===
- Armenia (1)
- Australia (3)
- Azerbaijan (1)
- Bahrain (2)
- Belarus (1)
- Belgium (2)
- Brazil (1)
- Bulgaria (1)
- Burkina Faso (1)
- Canada (2)
- Chile (1)
- China (5)
- Chinese Taipei (1)
- Egypt (9)
- Estonia (1)
- Finland (4)
- France (7)
- Germany (3)
- Great Britain (4)
- Hungary (1)
- India (1)
- Indonesia (1)
- Iran (6)
- Israel (2)
- Japan (1)
- Jordan (1)
- Kazakhstan (1)
- Kuwait (2)
- Kyrgyzstan (2)
- Libya (4)
- Malaysia (2)
- Mexico (2)
- Moldova (1)
- Morocco (2)
- Netherlands (1)
- Nigeria (5)
- Norway (2)
- Oman (1)
- Peru (1)
- Poland (10)
- Qatar (1)
- Romania (1)
- Russia (4)
- Saudi Arabia (2)
- Slovakia (1)
- South Korea (7)
- Spain (2)
- Sweden (3)
- Switzerland (1)
- Syria (2)
- Thailand (1)
- Uganda (1)
- Ukraine (3)
- United Arab Emirates (1)
- United States (10)
- Venezuela (2)

== Medal summary ==
Event	Gold	Silver	Bronze
Men's 48 kg	Jung Yong Kwak; South Korea	Abraham Obaretin; Nigeria	Anthony Peddle; Great Britain
Men's 52 kg	Keum Jong Jung; South Korea	Jian Wang; China	Johnson Sulola; Nigeria
Men's 56 kg	Gomma G. Ahmed; Egypt	Fereydoun Karimipour; Iran	Sang Jin Yoon; South Korea
Men's 60 kg	Monday Emoghavwe; Nigeria	Metwaly Mathna; Egypt	Allahbakhsh Akbari; Iran
Men's 67.5 kg	Hai Dong Zhang; China	Emadeldin Mohamed; Egypt	Zeinal Siavoshani; Iran
Men's 75 kg	Ryszard Fornalczyk; Poland	Jong Park; South Korea	Abd Elmonem Farag; Egypt
Men's 82.5 kg	Bernd Vogel; Germany	Mostafa Hamed; Egypt	Jiahua Zhou; China
Men's 90 kg	Ryszard Tomaszewski; Poland	Brian McNicholl; Australia	Frank Gyland; Norway
Men's 100 kg	Zhiqiang Luo; China	Sherif Bakr; Egypt	Patrick Akutaekwe; Nigeria
Men's +100 kg	Kim Brownfield; United States	Leszek Hallmann; Poland	Pernell Cooper; United States

== See also ==
- Weightlifting at the 1996 Summer Olympics
