= Iyabo Ismaila =

Nigerian Paralympic powerlifter

Sport
- Country: Nigeria
- Sport: Paralympic powerlifting
Medal record
Paralympic Games
Gold medal – first place	2000 Sydney	48 kg

Iyabo Ismaila is a Nigerian Paralympic powerlifter. She represented Nigeria at the 2000 Summer Paralympics and at the 2004 Summer Paralympics and she won the gold medal in the women's 48 kg event in 2000. In 2004, she competed in the women's 52 kg event where she did not record a mark.
