= Stephen Davou =

Nigerian Paralympic powerlifter

Sport
- Country: Nigeria
- Sport: Paralympic powerlifting
Medal record
Paralympic Games
Bronze medal – third place	2000 Sydney	56 kg

Stephen Davou is a Nigerian Paralympic powerlifter. He represented Nigeria at the 2000 Summer Paralympics held in Sydney, Australia and he won the bronze medal in the men's 56 kg event.
