= Monday Emoghavwe =

Nigerian powerlifter (born 1963)

Personal information
- Born: 2 April 1963 (age 63) Abraka, Nigeria

Sport
- Country: Nigeria
- Sport: Powerlifting
Medal record
Powerlifting
Representing Nigeria
Paralympic Games
Gold medal – first place	1992 Barcelona	48 kg
Gold medal – first place	1996 Atlanta	60 kg
Gold medal – first place	2000 Sydney	67.5 kg

Monday Emoghavwe (Note: Sometimes spelled as Monday Emoghawve in some sources.) (born 2 April 1963) is a Nigerian powerlifter. He represented Nigeria at the 1992 Summer Paralympics, at the 1996 Summer Paralympics and at the 2000 Summer Paralympics. He won the gold medal three times: he won the gold medal in the Men's 48 kg event at the 1992 Summer Paralympics, Men's 60 kg event at the 1996 Summer Paralympics and he also won the gold medal in the Men's 67.5 kg event at the 2000 Summer Paralympics. He also won a gold medal during the 1995 All-Africa Games held in Harare, Zimbabwe.

Emoghavwe also serves as president of the Nigeria Paralympic Committee. In 2018, he received the Distinguished Merit Award by the Nigeria Olympic Committee.
