= Patricia Okafor =

Nigerian Paralympic powerlifter

Sport
- Country: Nigeria
- Sport: Paralympic powerlifting
Medal record
Paralympic Games
Gold medal – first place	2000 Sydney	-67.5 kg

Patricia Okafor is a Nigerian Paralympic powerlifter. She represented Nigeria at the 2000 Summer Paralympics held in Sydney, Australia and she won the gold medal in the women's 67.5 kg event.
