= Johnson Sulola =

Nigerian Paralympic powerlifter

Sport
- Country: Nigeria
- Sport: Paralympic powerlifting
Medal record
Paralympic Games
Bronze medal – third place	1996 Atlanta	52 kg

Johnson Sulola is a Nigerian Paralympic powerlifter. He represented Nigeria at the 1996 Summer Paralympics held in Atlanta, United States and he won the bronze medal in the men's 52 kg event.
