= Powerlifting at the 1992 Summer Paralympics =

Powerlifting event

Powerlifting at the IX Paralympic Games
- Paralympic Powerlifting

Paralympic symbol (1988-1994)

Powerlifting at the 1992 Summer Paralympics consisted of ten events for men.

== Medal summary ==
Event	Gold	Silver	Bronze
Men's 48 kg	Monday Emoghawve; Nigeria	Jung Yong Kwak; South Korea	Talaat Elsdek; Egypt
Men's 52 kg	Gomma G. Ahmed; Egypt	Chris O'Neill; United States	Andrzej Greń; Poland
Men's 56 kg	Sang Jin Youn; South Korea	Krzysztof Owsiany; Poland	Abd Elmonem Farag; Egypt
Men's 60 kg	Emadeldin Mohamed; Egypt	Henryk Kohnke; Poland	Dae Heon Shin; South Korea
Men's 67.5 kg	Ryszard Fornalczyk; Poland	Said M. Abd El Hafez; Egypt	Carl Muylle; Belgium
Men's 75 kg	Kristoffer Hulecki; Sweden	Pierre Vanderheyden; Belgium	Mossad Eleraki; Egypt
Men's 82.5 kg	Bernd Vogel; Germany	Frank Gyland; Norway	Miroslaw Maliszewski; Poland
Men's 90 kg	Ryszard Tomaszewski; Poland	Nicholas Slater; Great Britain	Janusz Sala; Poland
Men's 100 kg	Krzysztof Palubicki; Poland	Jean-Luc Darrondeau; France	Tommy Leck; Sweden
Men's +100 kg	Bengt Lindberg; Sweden	Mohamed Sarhan; Egypt	Alfredo Battistini; Switzerland

=== Medal table ===
Rank	Nation	Gold	Silver	Bronze	Total
1	Poland (POL)	3	2	3	8
2	Egypt (EGY)	2	2	3	7
3	Sweden (SWE)	2	0	1	3
4	South Korea (KOR)	1	1	1	3
5	Germany (GER)	1	0	0	1
5	Nigeria (NGR)	1	0	0	1
7	Belgium (BEL)	0	1	1	2
8	France (FRA)	0	1	0	1
8	Great Britain (GBR)	0	1	0	1
8	Norway (NOR)	0	1	0	1
8	United States (USA)	0	1	0	1
12	Switzerland (SUI)	0	0	1	1
Totals (12 entries)		10	10	10	30
