= Börries von Münchhausen =

German poet and activist

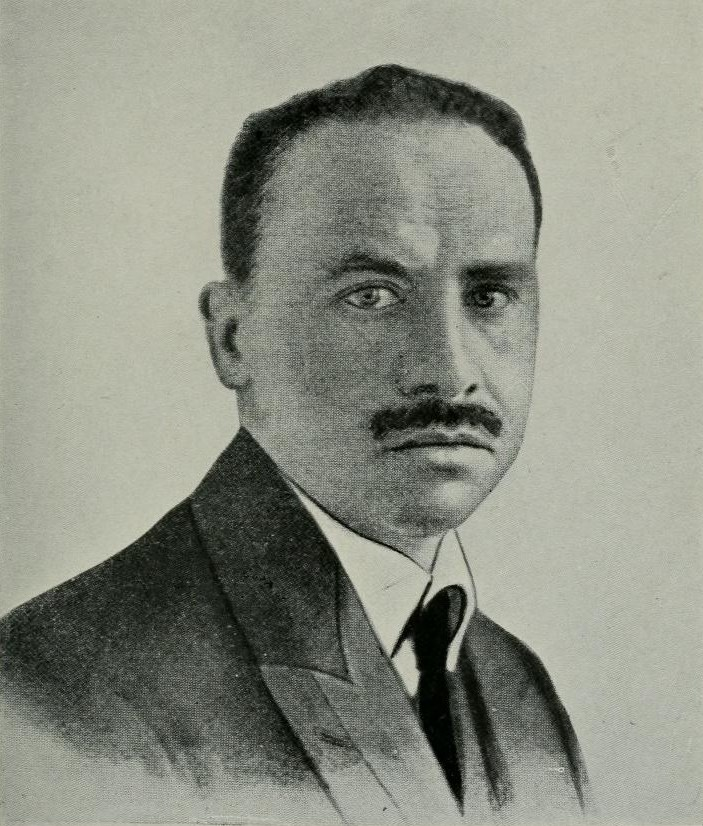
Börries von Münchhausen

Börries Albrecht Conon August Heinrich Freiherr von Münchhausen (20 March 1874 – 16 March 1945) was a German poet and Nazi activist.

== Biography ==
He was born in Hildesheim, the eldest child of Kammerherr Börries von Münchhausen and his wife, Clementine von der Gablentz. At 13, he was sent to Ilfeld to the monastery school. He studied law and political science at the universities of Heidelberg, Munich, Göttingen, and Berlin. He received his degree from the University of Leipzig.

While he was still a student, he composed a number of ballads and published his first collection of poetry in 1898, which expressed adherence to German Romantic poets' fascination with the Middle Ages and the world of German legend. All his works appeared around the turn of the century. After World War I, his popularity quickly waned. His position became more and more reactionary with the founding of the Deutsche Dichterakademie, with its seat on the Wartburg, which belonged to von Münchhausen's cousin Hans von der Gabelentz. The motto of the academy was to be "German, Christian, and above all conscious of tradition." Overly obsessed with his inherited nobility title as a Baron (which was legally void and meaningless in the Weimar Republic), he grew weary of the big modern cities filled with modernized urban commoners and began to spend more and more time on his rural country estates amongst peasants and traditional country folks.

Since his early years, he held ambivalent attitudes about the Jews several of whom he knew personally from his daily life. His early poetry included topics of hebrew nobility and hebrew heroism, which he deeply admired - in contrast to the yiddish Ostenjuden against whom he held hostile resentments. In this way Börries von Münchhausen turned into an early supporter of zionist antisemitism. After the rise of the NSDAP in 1933 (see below) he was repeatedly criticized by the new powers for his earlier pro-hebrew heroism, and begann to modify his earlier works accordingly for revised editions and re-publications under the new regime. Meanwhile, his openly growing antisemitism lead to much disappointment on the side of his former Jewish supporters who had helped him considerably with the production and publication of his early pro-hebrew heroic poetry.

With Hitler's rise to power, many of the members of the Prussian Academy of Sciences in Berlin were either dismissed or resigned. This was von Münchhausen's chance, and he signed the Gelöbnis treuester Gefolgschaft, the vow of fidelity to Adolf Hitler and his friends from the Wartburg were elected to take the place of such writers as Alfred Döblin and Thomas Mann.

Von Münchhausen agreed with Hitler's Machtpolitik and worked hard to make the Prussian Academy into a German Academy. However, these efforts came to naught despite Hermann Göring's support. Baron von Münchhausen took an overdose of sleeping pills and died on 16 March 1945 aged 70.
