= Nigeria at the 2000 Summer Paralympics =

- IPC code: NGR
- NPC: Nigeria Paralympic Committee

in Sydney
- Competitors: 31 (20 male, 11 female)
- Medals Ranked 22nd: Gold 7 Silver 1 Bronze 5 Total 13

Summer Paralympics appearances (overview)
- 1992; 1996; 2000; 2004; 2008; 2012; 2016; 2020; 2024

Nigeria competed at the 2000 Summer Paralympics, sending a 31-member strong delegation that won 13 medals, 7 of which were gold.

== Team ==
Nigeria sent a 31-member strong team, which included 11 women and 20 men.

== Background ==
In many parts of Black Africa, people who have disabilities that include insanity, and physical disabilities such as impairments and deformities often face cultural barriers to participation because of attitudes related to their disabilities. These include beliefs that they acquired their disabilities because their parents were witches or they are wizards. Their disability is often seen as a result of a personal failing on their part. As such, there is often tremendous cultural pressure for people with physical disabilities to remain hidden and out of the public eye. In many places, they are perceived to be monsters in need of healing. This is the context to which Nigerian Paralympians engage both society and sport internally, in their own country.

== Medals ==
Nigeria won seven gold medals at the Sydney Games. This was the most in the country's history after making their debut at the 1992 Summer Paralympics. The Nigerian Paralympic delegation left the Games having won more medals than their Olympic counterparts.

Medal	Name	Sport	Event
Gold	Edith Nzuruike	Athletics	Women's javelin F58
Gold	Monday Emoghavwe	Powerlifting	Men's -67.5 kg
Gold	Iyabo Ismaila	Powerlifting	Women's -48 kg
Gold	Victoria Nneji	Powerlifting	Women's -60 kg
Gold	Patricia Okafor	Powerlifting	Women's -67.5 kg
Gold	Tajudeen Agunbiade	Table tennis	Men's singles 9
Gold	Tunde Adisa; Tajudeen Agunbiade; Femi Alabi	Table tennis	Men's teams 9
Silver	Lucy Ejike	Powerlifting	Women's -44 kg
Bronze	Stephen Davou	Powerlifting	Men's -56 kg
Bronze	Patricia Nnaji	Powerlifting	Women's -52 kg
Bronze	Kike Adedeji Ogunbamowo	Powerlifting	Women's -75 kg
Bronze	Faith Igbinehin	Powerlifting	Women's +82.5 kg
Bronze	Femi Alabi	Table tennis	Men's singles 9

=== Athletics ===
Nigerian athletes competed at the 1999 Disabled Sports USA DS/USA's National Summer Games as part of their preparation efforts for the 2000 Games.

=== Powerlifting ===
Lucy Ejike competed in women's powerlifting. These Games were the ones where she made her Paralympic debut.

== See also ==
- Nigeria at the 2000 Summer Olympics
- Nigeria at the Paralympics

== Bibliography ==
- International Paralympic Committee (2000). "Appendix C: Athlete Numbers - By Delegation". Sydney 2000 Paralympic Games Post Games Report. Sydney.
