= Otto von Münchhausen =

German botanist

Freiherr Otto von Münchhausen
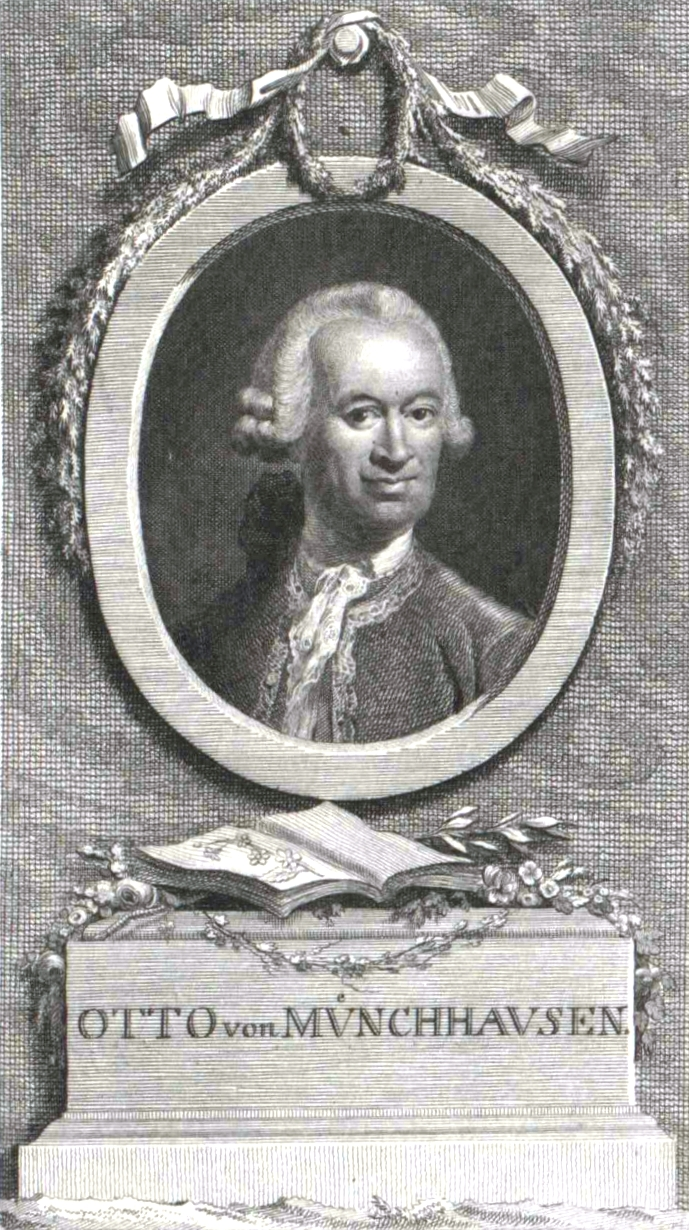
- Born: 11 June 1716; Schwöbber bei Hameln
- Died: 13 July 1774 (aged 58); Kalenberg, Germany
- Known for: Naming several species of oaks
- Scientific career
- Fields: Botany
- Institutions: University of Göttingen (Chancellor)
- Author abbrev. (botany): Münchh

Otto II. Freiherr von Münchhausen (11 June 1716 – 13 July 1774) was a German botanist. He was Chancellor of University of Göttingen and a correspondent of Linnaeus. He named several species of oaks by the Linnean system, as well as other plants.

The standard botanical author abbreviation Münchh. is applied to species he described.
