= Hungary at the Paralympics =

- IPC code: HUN
- NPC: Hungarian Paralympic Committee
- Website: www.hparalimpia.hu
- Medals Ranked 38th: Gold 38 Silver 55 Bronze 65 Total 158

Summer appearances
- 1972; 1976; 1980; 1984; 1988; 1992; 1996; 2000; 2004; 2008; 2012; 2016; 2020; 2024

Winter appearances
- 2002; 2006; 2010; 2014; 2018; 2022

Hungary made its Paralympic Games début at the 1972 Summer Paralympics in Heidelberg, with a delegation of four athletes in track and field. Following another appearance in 1976 the country was then absent in 1980. The Hungarian delegation made a permanent return to the Summer Paralympics in 1984. Hungary first took part in the Winter Paralympics in 2002, and continuously attended the Winter Games through 2010. Hungary was absent from the 2014 Winter Games.

Hungarians have won a total of 144 Paralympic medals (31 gold, 49 silver, 64 bronze), placing the country 38th on the all-time Paralympic Games medal table. All of these medals have been won at the Summer Games.

Arguably Hungary's most successful Paralympian is Attila Jeszenszky, who won four gold medals in swimming at the 1984 Summer Games. Hungary also boasts the only athlete in the world to have won medals at both the Paralympics and the Olympics. Fencer Pál Szekeres won a bronze medal at the 1988 Summer Olympics, before being disabled in a bus accident and beginning a Paralympic career in wheelchair fencing, which brought him six Paralympic medals - of which three gold.

== Medals ==
=== Summer Paralympics ===
| Event | Gold | Silver | Bronze | Total | Ranking |
| 1972 Summer Paralympics | 0 | 0 | 1 | 1 | 30 |
| 1976 Summer Paralympics | 1 | 0 | 1 | 2 | 30 |
| 1984 Summer Paralympics | 12 | 12 | 3 | 27 | 18 |
| 1988 Summer Paralympics | 0 | 4 | 8 | 12 | 40 |
| 1992 Summer Paralympics | 4 | 3 | 4 | 11 | 25 |
| 1996 Summer Paralympics | 5 | 2 | 3 | 10 | 29 |
| 2000 Summer Paralympics | 4 | 5 | 12 | 21 | 32 |
| 2004 Summer Paralympics | 1 | 8 | 10 | 19 | 46 |
| 2008 Summer Paralympics | 1 | 0 | 5 | 6 | 49 |
| 2012 Summer Paralympics | 2 | 6 | 6 | 14 | 38 |
| 2016 Summer Paralympics | 1 | 8 | 9 | 18 | 47 |
| 2020 Summer Paralympics | 7 | 5 | 4 | 16 | 18 |
| 2024 Summer Paralympics | 5 | 6 | 4 | 15 | 26 |
| Total | 43 | 59 | 70 | 172 | 35 |

=== Winter Paralympics ===
| Event | Gold | Silver | Bronze | Total | Ranking |
| 2002 Winter Paralympics | 0 | 0 | 0 | 0 | - |
| 2006 Winter Paralympics | 0 | 0 | 0 | 0 | - |
| 2010 Winter Paralympics | 0 | 0 | 0 | 0 | - |
| 2018 Winter Paralympics | 0 | 0 | 0 | 0 | - |
| 2022 Winter Paralympics | 0 | 0 | 0 | 0 | - |
| Total | 0 | 0 | 0 | 0 | - |

=== Medals by Summer Sport ===
| Sports | Gold | Silver | Bronze | Total |
|---|---|---|---|---|
| Swimming | 29 | 30 | 34 | 93 |
| Wheelchair Fencing | 4 | 13 | 10 | 27 |
| Athletics | 4 | 12 | 7 | 23 |
| Table Tennis | 4 | 2 | 9 | 15 |
| Canoeing | 2 | 1 | 1 | 4 |
| Powerlifting | 0 | 1 | 2 | 3 |
| Judo | 0 | 0 | 5 | 5 |
| Boccia | 0 | 0 | 1 | 1 |
| Shooting | 0 | 0 | 1 | 1 |
| Total | 43 | 59 | 70 | 172 |

=== Medals by Winter Sport ===
| Games | Gold | Silver | Bronze | Total |
| Total | 0 | 0 | 0 | 0 |

== Medalists ==
| Medal | Name | Games | Sport | Event |
|---|---|---|---|---|
| Bronze | András Fejes | (Germany) 1972 Heidelberg | Athletics | Men's 60m wheelchair 1A |
| Gold | Zoltán Tauber | (Canada) 1976 Toronto | Table tennis | Men's singles E |
| Bronze | József Oláh | (Canada) 1976 Toronto | Athletics | Men's 100m B |
| Gold | József Oláh | (United Kingdom) (United States) 1984 Stoke Mandeville/New York | Athletics | Men's high jump B3 |
| Gold | Tibor Szabó | (United Kingdom) (United States) 1984 Stoke Mandeville/New York | Athletics | Men's shot put L2 |
| Gold | András Tóth | (United Kingdom) (United States) 1984 Stoke Mandeville/New York | Swimming | Men's 50m backstroke L3 |
| Gold | Ferenc Stettner | (United Kingdom) (United States) 1984 Stoke Mandeville/New York | Swimming | Men's 100m backstroke L6 |
| Gold | Géza Dukai | (United Kingdom) (United States) 1984 Stoke Mandeville/New York | Swimming | Men's 100m breaststroke A1 |
| Gold | Attila Jeszenszky | (United Kingdom) (United States) 1984 Stoke Mandeville/New York | Swimming | Men's 100m breaststroke L6 |
| Gold | Géza Dukai | (United Kingdom) (United States) 1984 Stoke Mandeville/New York | Swimming | Men's 100m butterfly A1 |
| Gold | Attila Jeszenszky | (United Kingdom) (United States) 1984 Stoke Mandeville/New York | Swimming | Men's 100m butterfly L6 |
| Gold | Géza Dukai | (United Kingdom) (United States) 1984 Stoke Mandeville/New York | Swimming | Men's 200m individual medley A1 |
| Gold | Attila Jeszenszky | (United Kingdom) (United States) 1984 Stoke Mandeville/New York | Swimming | Men's 200m individual medley L6 |
| Gold | Attila Jeszenszky; László Pálinkás; Ferenc Stettner; György Tory | (United Kingdom) (United States) 1984 Stoke Mandeville/New York | Swimming | Men's 4x50m medley relay L1-L6 |
| Gold | Judit Hoffman | (United Kingdom) (United States) 1984 Stoke Mandeville/New York | Swimming | Women's 100m breaststroke L6 |
| Silver | Péter Lorencz | (United Kingdom) (United States) 1984 Stoke Mandeville/New York | Athletics | Men's high jump A6 |
| Silver | Tibor Szabó | (United Kingdom) (United States) 1984 Stoke Mandeville/New York | Athletics | Men's discus throw L2 |
| Silver | Gábor Czuth | (United Kingdom) (United States) 1984 Stoke Mandeville/New York | Athletics | Men's javelin throw B3 |
| Silver | László Németh | (United Kingdom) (United States) 1984 Stoke Mandeville/New York | Athletics | Men's pentathlon B1 |
| Silver | Józsefné Király | (United Kingdom) (United States) 1984 Stoke Mandeville/New York | Athletics | Women's discus throw L5 |
| Silver | Józsefné Király | (United Kingdom) (United States) 1984 Stoke Mandeville/New York | Athletics | Women's javelin throw L5 |
| Silver | Józsefné Király | (United Kingdom) (United States) 1984 Stoke Mandeville/New York | Athletics | Women's shot put L5 |
| Silver | György Tory | (United Kingdom) (United States) 1984 Stoke Mandeville/New York | Swimming | Men's 100m freestyle L5 |
| Silver | György Tory | (United Kingdom) (United States) 1984 Stoke Mandeville/New York | Swimming | Men's 200m individual medley L5 |
| Silver | Ferenc Stettner | (United Kingdom) (United States) 1984 Stoke Mandeville/New York | Swimming | Men's 200m individual medley L6 |
| Silver | Judit Hoffman | (United Kingdom) (United States) 1984 Stoke Mandeville/New York | Swimming | Women's 100m backstroke L6 |
| Silver | Judit Hoffman | (United Kingdom) (United States) 1984 Stoke Mandeville/New York | Swimming | Women's 200m individual medley L6 |
| Bronze | Lajos Nyin | (United Kingdom) (United States) 1984 Stoke Mandeville/New York | Athletics | Men's discus throw L5 |
| Bronze | Lajos Nyin | (United Kingdom) (United States) 1984 Stoke Mandeville/New York | Athletics | Men's javelin throw L5 |
| Bronze | Géza Dukai | (United Kingdom) (United States) 1984 Stoke Mandeville/New York | Swimming | Men's 100m freestyle A1 |
| Silver | István Nánási | (South Korea) 1988 Seoul | Athletics | Men's shot put A2/A9 |
| Silver | Dénes Nagy | (South Korea) 1988 Seoul | Athletics | Men's shot put B3 |
| Silver | István Nánási | (South Korea) 1988 Seoul | Powerlifting | Men's +100 kg |
| Silver | György Tory | (South Korea) 1988 Seoul | Swimming | Men's 400m freestyle L6 |
| Bronze | Géza Dukai | (South Korea) 1988 Seoul | Swimming | Men's 100m freestyle A1 |
| Bronze | András Tóth | (South Korea) 1988 Seoul | Swimming | Men's 50m backstroke L3 |
| Bronze | Géza Dukai | (South Korea) 1988 Seoul | Swimming | Men's 100m breaststroke A1 |
| Bronze | Sándor Takács | (South Korea) 1988 Seoul | Swimming | Men's 100m breaststroke A6 |
| Bronze | János Becsey | (South Korea) 1988 Seoul | Swimming | Men's 200m individual medley C8 |
| Bronze | Attila Szepesi | (South Korea) 1988 Seoul | Table tennis | Men's singles TT5 |
| Bronze | Győző Kovács; Attila Szepesi | (South Korea) 1988 Seoul | Table tennis | Men's teams TT5 |
| Bronze | Lajos Erdős; Károly Majsai | (South Korea) 1988 Seoul | Table tennis | Men's teams TT6 |
| Gold | Zsolt Vereczkei | (Spain) 1992 Barcelona | Swimming | Men's 50m backstroke S5 |
| Gold | János Becsey | (Spain) 1992 Barcelona | Swimming | Men's 50m freestyle S7 |
| Gold | János Becsey | (Spain) 1992 Barcelona | Swimming | Men's 100m freestyle S7 |
| Gold | Pál Szekeres | (Spain) 1992 Barcelona | Wheelchair fencing | Men's foil 2 |
| Silver | Katalin Engelhardt | (Spain) 1992 Barcelona | Swimming | Women's 50m butterfly S6 |
| Silver | Anikó Laki | (Spain) 1992 Barcelona | Swimming | Women's 100m breaststroke SB8 |
| Silver | Ilona Sasváriné Paulik; Judit Pusztafiné | (Spain) 1992 Barcelona | Table tennis | Women's team 3 |
| Bronze | Attila Pazinczár | (Spain) 1992 Barcelona | Athletics | Men's discus throw B3 |
| Bronze | János Becsey | (Spain) 1992 Barcelona | Swimming | Men's 100m breaststroke SB7 |
| Bronze | Diána Zámbó | (Spain) 1992 Barcelona | Swimming | Women's 50m butterfly S6 |
| Bronze | Ilona Sasváriné Paulik | (Spain) 1992 Barcelona | Table tennis | Women's singles 3 |
| Gold | Zsolt Vereczkei | (United States) 1996 Atlanta | Swimming | Men's 50m backstroke S5 |
| Gold | Katalin Engelhardt; Mónika Járomi; Gitta Ráczkó; Diána Zámbó | (United States) 1996 Atlanta | Swimming | Women's 4x50m medley S1-6 |
| Gold | Ilona Sasváriné Paulik | (United States) 1996 Atlanta | Table tennis | Women's singles 3 |
| Gold | Pál Szekeres | (United States) 1996 Atlanta | Wheelchair fencing | Men's foil individual B |
| Gold | Pál Szekeres | (United States) 1996 Atlanta | Wheelchair fencing | Men's sabre individual B |
| Silver | Mónika Járomi | (United States) 1996 Atlanta | Swimming | Women's 50m butterfly S5 |
| Silver | Judit Pálfi | (United States) 1996 Atlanta | Wheelchair fencing | Women's foil individual B |
| Bronze | Katalin Engelhardt | (United States) 1996 Atlanta | Swimming | Women's 50m butterfly S5 |
| Bronze | Gitta Ráczkó | (United States) 1996 Atlanta | Swimming | Women's 100m breaststroke SB5 |
| Bronze | Katalin Engelhardt | (United States) 1996 Atlanta | Swimming | Women's 200m individual medley SM5 |
| Gold | Zsolt Vereczkei | (Australia) 2000 Sydney | Swimming | Men's 50m backstroke S5 |
| Gold | Krisztián Sánta | (Australia) 2000 Sydney | Swimming | Men's 100m backstroke S14 |
| Gold | Gábor Májer; János Rácz; Krisztián Sánta; Tibor Szedő | (Australia) 2000 Sydney | Swimming | Men's 4x50m medley relay S14 |
| Gold | Dóra Pásztory | (Australia) 2000 Sydney | Swimming | Women's 200m individual medley SM8 |
| Silver | Krisztián Sánta | (Australia) 2000 Sydney | Swimming | Men's 50m butterfly S14 |
| Silver | Krisztián Sánta | (Australia) 2000 Sydney | Swimming | Men's 50m freestyle S14 |
| Silver | Krisztián Sánta | (Australia) 2000 Sydney | Swimming | Men's 100m freestyle S14 |
| Silver | János Becsey | (Australia) 2000 Sydney | Swimming | Men's 200m individual medley SM7 |
| Silver | Judit Pálfi | (Australia) 2000 Sydney | Wheelchair fencing | Women's épée individual B |
| Bronze | Sándor Ponyori | (Australia) 2000 Sydney | Athletics | Men's long jump F20 |
| Bronze | Gábor Vincze | (Australia) 2000 Sydney | Judo | Men's -81 kg |
| Bronze | Ervin Kovács | (Australia) 2000 Sydney | Swimming | Men's 50m butterfly S5 |
| Bronze | Ervin Kovács | (Australia) 2000 Sydney | Swimming | Men's 100m breaststroke SB4 |
| Bronze | Ervin Kovács | (Australia) 2000 Sydney | Swimming | Men's 50m freestyle S5 |
| Bronze | Tibor Szedő | (Australia) 2000 Sydney | Swimming | Men's 50m butterfly S14 |
| Bronze | János Rácz | (Australia) 2000 Sydney | Swimming | Men's 100m breaststroke SB14 |
| Bronze | Krisztián Sánta | (Australia) 2000 Sydney | Swimming | Men's 200m individual medley SM14 |
| Bronze | Katalin Engelhardt | (Australia) 2000 Sydney | Swimming | Women's 50m butterfly S5 |
| Bronze | Dára Pásztory | (Australia) 2000 Sydney | Swimming | Women's 100m butterfly S8 |
| Bronze | Pál Szekeres | (Australia) 2000 Sydney | Wheelchair fencing | Men's foil individual B |
| Bronze | Zsuzsanna Krajnyák | (Australia) 2000 Sydney | Wheelchair fencing | Women's foil individual A |
| Gold | Dóra Pásztory | (Greece) 2004 Athens | Swimming | Women's 200m individual medley SM8 |
| Silver | Ervin Kovács | (Greece) 2004 Athens | Swimming | Men's 50m butterfly S4 |
| Silver | Ervin Kovács | (Greece) 2004 Athens | Swimming | Men's 50m backstroke S5 |
| Silver | Ervin Kovács | (Greece) 2004 Athens | Swimming | Men's 200m individual medley SM5 |
| Silver | Dóra Pásztory | (Greece) 2004 Athens | Swimming | Women's 100m butterfly S8 |
| Silver | Dóra Pásztory | (Greece) 2004 Athens | Swimming | Women's 100m backstroke S8 |
| Silver | Gyöngyi Dani; Andrea Jurák; Zsuzsanna Krajnyák; Judit Pálfi | (Greece) 2004 Athens | Wheelchair fencing | Women's épée team open |
| Silver | Gyöngyi Dani | (Greece) 2004 Athens | Wheelchair fencing | Women's foil individual B |
| Silver | Gyöngyi Dani; Andrea Jurák; Zsuzsanna Krajnyák; Judit Pálfi | (Greece) 2004 Athens | Wheelchair fencing | Women's foil team open |
| Bronze | Dezső Béres; József Gyurkota | (Greece) 2004 Athens | Boccia | Mixed pairs BC4 |
| Bronze | Norbert Bíró | (Greece) 2004 Athens | Judo | Men's -60 kg |
| Bronze | Gábor Vincze | (Greece) 2004 Athens | Judo | Men's -81 kg |
| Bronze | Sándorné Nagy | (Greece) 2004 Athens | Judo | Women's -70 kg |
| Bronze | Csaba Szávai | (Greece) 2004 Athens | Powerlifting | Men's +100 kg |
| Bronze | Zsolt Vereczkei | (Greece) 2004 Athens | Swimming | Men's 50m backstroke S5 |
| Bronze | Katalin Engelhardt | (Greece) 2004 Athens | Swimming | Women's 50m butterfly S5 |
| Bronze | Gitta Ráczkó | (Greece) 2004 Athens | Swimming | Women's 100m breaststroke SB5 |
| Bronze | Pál Szekeres | (Greece) 2004 Athens | Wheelchair fencing | Men's sabre individual B |
| Bronze | Zsuzsanna Krajnyák | (Greece) 2004 Athens | Wheelchair fencing | Women's épée individual A |
| Gold | Tamás Sors | (China) 2008 Beijing | Swimming | Men's 100m butterfly S9 |
| Bronze | Tamás Sors | (China) 2008 Beijing | Swimming | Men's 100m freestyle S9 |
| Bronze | Tamás Sors | (China) 2008 Beijing | Swimming | Men's 400m freestyle S9 |
| Bronze | Zsolt Vereczkei | (China) 2008 Beijing | Swimming | Men's 50m backstroke S5 |
| Bronze | Gitta Ráczkó | (China) 2008 Beijing | Swimming | Women's 100m breaststroke SB5 |
| Bronze | Pál Szekeres | (China) 2008 Beijing | Wheelchair fencing | Men's individual foil B |
| Gold | Tamás Sors | (United Kingdom) 2012 London | Swimming | Men's 100m butterfly S9 |
| Gold | Péter Pálos | (United Kingdom) 2012 London | Table tennis | Men's individual class 11 |
| Silver | Tamás Tóth | (United Kingdom) 2012 London | Swimming | Men's 50m freestyle S9 |
| Silver | Tamás Tóth | (United Kingdom) 2012 London | Swimming | Men's 100m freestyle S9 |
| Silver | Tamás Sors | (United Kingdom) 2012 London | Swimming | Men's 400m freestyle S9 |
| Silver | Zsuzsanna Krajnyák | (United Kingdom) 2012 London | Wheelchair fencing | Women's individual épée A |
| Silver | Gyöngyi Dani | (United Kingdom) 2012 London | Wheelchair fencing | Women's individual foil B |
| Silver | Gyöngyi Dani; Veronika Juhász; Zsuzsanna Krajnyák | (United Kingdom) 2012 London | Wheelchair fencing | Women's team open |
| Bronze | Ilona Biacsi | (United Kingdom) 2012 London | Athletics | Women's 1500m T20 |
| Bronze | Nikolett Szabó | (United Kingdom) 2012 London | Judo | Women's -70 kg |
| Bronze | Zsolt Vereczkei | (United Kingdom) 2012 London | Swimming | Men's 50m backstroke S5 |
| Bronze | Tamás Sors | (United Kingdom) 2012 London | Swimming | Men's 100m freestyle S9 |
| Bronze | Richárd Osváth | (United Kingdom) 2012 London | Wheelchair fencing | Men's individual foil A |
| Bronze | Zsuzsanna Krajnyák | (United Kingdom) 2012 London | Wheelchair fencing | Women's individual foil A |
| Gold | Tamás Tóth | (Brazil) 2016 Rio de Janeiro | Swimming | Men's 100m backstroke S9 |
| Silver | Ilona Biacsi | (Brazil) 2016 Rio de Janeiro | Athletics | Women's 1500m T20 |
| Silver | Róbert Suba | (Brazil) 2016 Rio de Janeiro | Paracanoeing | Men's KL1 |
| Silver | Tamás Sors | (Brazil) 2016 Rio de Janeiro | Swimming | Men's 200m individual medley SM9 |
| Silver | Bianka Pap | (Brazil) 2016 Rio de Janeiro | Swimming | Women's 100m backstroke S10 |
| Silver | András Csonka | (Brazil) 2016 Rio de Janeiro | Table tennis | Men's individual class 8 |
| Silver | Richárd Osváth | (Brazil) 2016 Rio de Janeiro | Wheelchair fencing | Men's foil A |
| Silver | Richárd Osváth | (Brazil) 2016 Rio de Janeiro | Wheelchair fencing | Men's sabre A |
| Silver | Gyöngyi Dani; Éva Hajmási; Zsuzsanna Krajnyák | (Brazil) 2016 Rio de Janeiro | Wheelchair fencing | Women's team foil |
| Bronze | Nándor Tunkel | (Brazil) 2016 Rio de Janeiro | Powerlifting | Men's -49 kg |
| Bronze | Tamás Tóth | (Brazil) 2016 Rio de Janeiro | Swimming | Men's 100m freestyle S9 |
| Bronze | Zsolt Vereczkei | (Brazil) 2016 Rio de Janeiro | Swimming | Men's 50m backstroke S5 |
| Bronze | Tamás Sors | (Brazil) 2016 Rio de Janeiro | Swimming | Men's 100m butterfly S9 |
| Bronze | Zsófia Konkoly | (Brazil) 2016 Rio de Janeiro | Swimming | Women's 100m butterfly S9 |
| Bronze | Bianka Pap | (Brazil) 2016 Rio de Janeiro | Swimming | Women's 200m individual medley SM10 |
| Bronze | Péter Pálos | (Brazil) 2016 Rio de Janeiro | Table tennis | Men's individual class 11 |
| Bronze | Zsuzsanna Krajnyák | (Brazil) 2016 Rio de Janeiro | Wheelchair fencing | Women's foil A |
| Bronze | Gyöngyi Dani; Zsuzsanna Krajnyák; Amarilla Veres | (Brazil) 2016 Rio de Janeiro | Wheelchair fencing | Women's team épée |
| Gold | Amarilla Veres | (Japan) 2020 Tokyo | Wheelchair fencing | Women's épée A |
| Gold | Péter Pálos | (Japan) 2020 Tokyo | Table tennis | Men's individual class 11 |
| Gold | Fanni Illés | (Japan) 2020 Tokyo | Swimming | Women's 100 metre backstroke SB4 |
| Gold | Luca Ekler | (Japan) 2020 Tokyo | Athletics | Women's long jump T38 |
| Gold | Zsófia Konkoly | (Japan) 2020 Tokyo | Swimming | Women's 100 metre butterfly S9 |
| Gold | Bianka Pap | (Japan) 2020 Tokyo | Swimming | Women's 100 metre backstroke S10 |
| Gold | Péter Pál Kiss | (Japan) 2020 Tokyo | Paracanoeing | Men's KL1 |
| Silver | Zsófia Konkoly | (Japan) 2020 Tokyo | Swimming | Women's 400 metre freestyle S9 |
| Silver | Zsófia Konkoly | (Japan) 2020 Tokyo | Swimming | Women's 200 metre individual medley SM9 |
| Silver | Bianka Pap | (Japan) 2020 Tokyo | Swimming | Women's 400 metre freestyle S10 |
| Silver | Bianka Pap | (Japan) 2020 Tokyo | Swimming | Women's 200 metre individual medley SM10 |
| Silver | Richárd Osváth | (Japan) 2020 Tokyo | Wheelchair fencing | Men's foil A |
| Bronze | Alexa Szvitacs | (Japan) 2020 Tokyo | Table tennis | Women's individual class 9 |
| Bronze | Zsuzsanna Krajnyák; Éva Hajmási; Gyöngyi Dani | (Japan) 2020 Tokyo | Wheelchair fencing | Women's team foil |
| Bronze | Krisztina Dávid | (Japan) 2020 Tokyo | Shooting | Women's P2 10 metre air pistol SH1 |
| Bronze | Katalin Varga | (Japan) 2020 Tokyo | Paracanoeing | Women's KL2 |
| Gold | Zsófia Konkoly | (France) 2024 Paris | Swimming | Women's 400 metre freestyle S9 |
| Gold | Zsófia Konkoly | (France) 2024 Paris | Swimming | Women's 200 metre individual medley SM9 |
| Gold | Luca Ekler | (France) 2024 Paris | Athletics | Women's long jump T38 |
| Gold | Bianka Pap | (France) 2024 Paris | Swimming | Women's 100 metre backstroke S10 |
| Gold | Péter Pál Kiss | (France) 2024 Paris | Paracanoeing | Men's KL1 |
| Silver | Fanni Illés | (France) 2024 Paris | Swimming | Women's 100 metre breaststroke SB4 |
| Silver | Éva Hajmási; Zsuzsanna Krajnyák; Boglárka Mező; Amarilla Veres | (France) 2024 Paris | Wheelchair fencing | Women's team foil |
| Silver | Petra Luterán | (France) 2024 Paris | Athletics | Women's long jump T47 |
| Silver | Zsófia Konkoly | (France) 2024 Paris | Swimming | Women's 100 metre butterfly S9 |
| Silver | Bianka Pap | (France) 2024 Paris | Swimming | Women's 200 metre individual medley SM10 |
| Silver | Luca Ekler | (France) 2024 Paris | Athletics | Women's 400 m jump T38 |
| Bronze | Endre Major | (France) 2024 Paris | Table tennis | Men's individual class 1 |
| Bronze | Péter Pálos | (France) 2024 Paris | Table tennis | Men's individual class 11 |
| Bronze | Bianka Pap | (France) 2024 Paris | Swimming | Women's 400 metre freestyle S10 |
| Bronze | Alexa Szvitacs | (France) 2024 Paris | Table tennis | Women's individual class 9 |

== See also ==
- Hungary at the Olympics
- Hungary at the European Games
