= Hungary at the 2024 Summer Paralympics =

- IPC code: HUN
- NPC: Hungarian Paralympic Committee

in Paris, France August 28, 2024 – September 8, 2024
- Competitors: 39 in 13 sports
- Flag bearers (opening): Fanni Illés; Bence Mocsári
- Flag bearers (closing): Zsófia Konkoly; Péter Pál Kiss
- Medals Ranked 26th: Gold 5 Silver 6 Bronze 4 Total 15

Summer Paralympics appearances (overview)
- 1972; 1976; 1980; 1984; 1988; 1992; 1996; 2000; 2004; 2008; 2012; 2016; 2020; 2024

Hungary competed at the 2024 Summer Paralympics in Paris, France, from 28 August to 8 September.

== Medalists ==
Medal	Name	Sport	Event	Date
Gold	Zsófia Konkoly	Swimming	Women's 400 m freestyle S9	29 August
Gold	Zsófia Konkoly	Swimming	Women's 200 m individual medley S9	5 September
Gold	Luca Ekler	Athletics	Women's long jump T38	5 September
Gold	Bianka Pap	Swimming	Women's 100 m backstroke S10	6 September
Gold	Péter Pál Kiss	Paracanoeing	Men's KL1	7 September
Silver	Fanni Illés	Swimming	Women's 100 m breaststroke SB4	2 September
Silver	Éva Hajmási; Zsuzsanna Krajnyák; Boglárka Mező; Amarilla Veres	Wheelchair fencing	Wheelchair fencing - Team foil A-B	5 September
Silver	Petra Luterán	Athletics	Women's long jump T47	6 September
Silver	Zsófia Konkoly	Swimming	Women's 100 m butterfly S9	6 September
Silver	Bianka Pap	Swimming	Women's 200 m individual medley SM10	7 September
Silver	Luca Ekler	Athletics	Women's 400 m T38	7 September
Bronze	Endre Major	Table tennis	Men's singles C1	4 September
Bronze	Péter Pálos	Table tennis	Men's singles C11	5 September
Bronze	Bianka Pap	Swimming	Women's 400 m freestyle S10	5 September
Bronze	Alexa Szvitacs	Table tennis	Women's individual C9	7 September

== Competitors ==
Sport	Men	Women	Total
Archery	1	0	1
Athletics	1	4	5
Boccia	0	2	2
Cycling	1	0	1
Equestrian	0	1	1
Judo	0	1	1
Paracanoeing	3	2	5
Paratriathlon	1	0	1
Powerlifting	1	0	1
Shooting	2	1	3
Swimming	1	6	7
Table tennis	3	1	4
Wheelchair fencing	4	2	6
Total	19	20	39

== Archery ==
Hungary secured one quota places in the men's W1 event by virtue of their result at the 2013 European Para Championships in Rotterdam, Netherlands.

Athlete	Event	Ranking Round		Round of 16	Quarterfinals	Semifinals	Finals	
Athlete	Event	Score	Seed	Opposition Score	Opposition Score	Opposition Score	Opposition Score	Rank
Tamás Gáspár	Men's individual W1	655	4	Letulle (FRA); W 136-119	Han (CHN); L 134-137	Did not advance		

== Athletics ==
Hungarian track and field athletes achieved quota places for the following events based on their results at the 2023 World Championships, 2024 World Championships, or through high performance allocation, as long as they meet the minimum entry standard (MES).

Key

- Note–Ranks given for track events are within the athlete's heat only
- Q = Qualified for the next round
- q = Qualified for the next round as a fastest loser or, in field events, by position without achieving the qualifying target
- DQ = Disqualified
- PR = Paralympic Record
- AR = Area (or continental) Record
- NR = National Record
- SB = Season's Best
- N/A = Round not applicable for the event
- Bye = Athlete not required to compete in round

Track events

Athlete	Event	Heat		Final	
Athlete	Event	Result	Rank	Result	Rank
Bernadett Biacsi	Women's 1500 m T20	—N/a		5:00.12	8
Ilona Biacsi	Women's 1500 m T20	—N/a		4:54.41	7
Luca Ekler	Women's 100 m T38	12.63	3 Q	12.78	5
Luca Ekler	Women's 400 m T38	1:01.02	1 Q	59.35	2nd place, silver medalist(s)
Petra Luterán	Women's 200 m T47	25.90	4	Did not advance	
Petra Luterán	Women's 400 m T47	58.93	2 Q	57.41	4

Field events

Athlete	Event	Final	
Athlete	Event	Result	Rank
István Szőllősi	Men's shot put F20	14.05	8
Luca Ekler	Women's long jump T38	5.56	1st place, gold medalist(s)
Petra Luterán	Women's long jump T47	5.85	2nd place, silver medalist(s)

== Boccia ==
Hungary entered two athletes after nominated top two individual athletes through the final world ranking.

Athlete	Event	Pool matches				Quarterfinals	Semifinals	Final / BM	
Athlete	Event	Opposition Score	Opposition Score	Opposition Score	Rank	Opposition Score	Opposition Score	Opposition Score	Rank
Vivien Nagy	Women's individual BC2	van Engelen (NED); L 3–4	Zayana (INA); L 1–6	—N/a	3	Did not advance			10
Alexandra Szabo	Women's individual BC4	Raguwaran (GER); W 6–0	Teixeira (BRA); L 3–4	Oliveira (POR); L 0–5	3	Did not advance			11

== Cycling ==
Athlete	Event	Qualification		Final	
Athlete	Event	Result	Rank	Result	Rank
Zsombor Wermeser	Men's time trial C4-5	1:05.912	10	Did not advance	
Zsombor Wermeser	Men's pursuit C5	4:27.008	9	Did not advance	

Qualification Legend: QB=Final Bronze medal; QG=Final Gold medal; QF=Final

== Equestrian ==
Individual

Athlete	Horse	Event	Total	
Athlete	Horse	Event	Score	Rank
Fonyódi Ildikó	Bojengel	Individual championship test grade V	67.769	13
Fonyódi Ildikó	Bojengel	Individual freestyle test grade V	Did not advance	

== Judo ==
Athlete	Event	Round of 16	Quarterfinals	Semifinals	Repechage	Final / BM	
Athlete	Event	Opposition Result	Opposition Result	Opposition Result	Opposition Result	Opposition Result	Rank
Flóra Burányi	Women's 57 kg J1	Gomez (ARG); L 00–10	Did not advance				

== Paracanoeing ==
Hungary earned quota places for the following events through the 2023 ICF Canoe Sprint World Championships in Duisburg, Germany; and 2024 ICF Canoe Sprint World Championships in Szeged.

Athlete	Event	Heats		Semifinal		Final	
Athlete	Event	Time	Rank	Time	Rank	Time	Rank
Robert Suba	Men's KL1	52.03	2 SF	49.82	2 FA	48.96	4
Robert Suba	Men's VL2	—N/a		55.34	3 FA	53.78	5
Péter Pál Kiss	Men's KL1	46.49	1 FA	Bye		44.55	1st place, gold medalist(s)
Tibor Kiss	Men's KL2	45.70	4 SF	46.08	5 FB	44.45	10
Nikoletta Molnár	Women's KL3	52.50	4 SF	50.62	3 FA	51.21	8
Katalin Varga	Women's KL2	52.52	1 FA	Bye		53.33	4
Dalma Boldizsár	Women's KL2	1:07.80	5 SF	1:08.37	5 FB	1:03.33	11
Dalma Boldizsár	Women's VL2	1:13.07	6 SF	1:12.93	4 FB	1:11.23	10

== Paratriathlon ==
Athlete	Event	Final	
Athlete	Event	Result	Rank
Bence Mocsári	Men's PTS5	1:00:03	5

== Powerlifting ==
Athlete	Event	Final	
Athlete	Event	Result	Rank
Nándor Tunkel	Men's 49 kg	162 kg	4

== Shooting ==
Hungary entered two para-shooter's after achieved quota places for the following events by virtue of their best finishes at the 2022, 2023 and 2024 world cup, 2022 World Championships, 2023 World Championships, 2023 European Para Championships and 2024 European Championships, as long as they obtained a minimum qualifying score (MQS) by May 31, 2020.

Athlete	Event	Qualification		Final	
Athlete	Event	Points	Rank	Points	Rank
Krisztina Dávid	P2 – Women's 10 metre air pistol SH1	567	2 Q	129.4	7
Krisztina Dávid	P3 – Mixed 25 m pistol SH1	553	21	Did not advance	
Krisztina Dávid	P4 – Mixed 50 m pistol SH1	533	9	Did not advance	
Gyula Gurisatti	P1 – Men's 10 metre air pistol SH1	548	23	Did not advance	
Gyula Gurisatti	P3 – Mixed 25 m pistol SH1	542	22	Did not advance	
Gyula Gurisatti	P4 – Mixed 50 m pistol SH1	516	23	Did not advance	
Csaba Rescsik	R1 – Men's 10 metre air rifle standing SH1	618.6	8 Q	140.0	7
Csaba Rescsik	R7 – Men's 50 metre rifle 3 positions SH1	1159	6 Q	419.4	5
Csaba Rescsik	R3 – Mixed 10 metre air rifle prone SH1	626.5	30	Did not advance	

== Swimming ==
Hungary secured two quotas at the 2023 World Para Swimming Championships after finishing in the top two places in Paralympic class disciplines.

	Event	Heats		Final	
	Event	Result	Rank	Result	Rank
Bence Iván	Men's 200 m individual medley SM6	2:56.41	4	Did not advance	
Zsanett Adámi-Rózsa	Women's 100 m backstroke S2	3:13.67	7 Q	3:16.19	7
Csenge Hotz	Women's 200 m individual medley SM10	DSQ		Did not advance	
Csenge Hotz	Women's 400 m freestyle S10	4:53.18	4 Q	4:53.31	7
Fanni Illés	Women's 100 m breaststroke SB4	1:50.21	2 Q	1:50.25	2nd place, silver medalist(s)
Zsófia Konkoly	Women's 400 m freestyle S9	4:50.20	2 Q	4:39.78	1st place, gold medalist(s)
Zsófia Konkoly	Women's 100 m butterfly S9	1:07.80	1 Q	1:06.79	2nd place, silver medalist(s)
Zsófia Konkoly	Women's 200 m individual medley SM9	2:36.75	1 Q	2:33.31	1st place, gold medalist(s)
Bianka Pap	Women's 400 m freestyle S10	4:40.84	1 Q	4:35.63	3rd place, bronze medalist(s)
Bianka Pap	Women's 200 m individual medley SM10	2:33.28	1 Q	2:29.02	2nd place, silver medalist(s)
Bianka Pap	Women's 100 m backstroke S10	1:08.60	1 Q	1:07.97	1st place, gold medalist(s)
Evelin Száraz	Women's 400 m freestyle S6	—N/a		5:57.98	8

== Table tennis ==
Hungary entered four athletes for the Paralympic games. Endre Major qualified for the games by virtue of his gold medal results at the 2023 European Para Championships held in Sheffield, Great Britain; meanwhile the other athletes qualified for the games through the allocations of ITTF final world ranking.

Athlete	Event	Round of 16	Quarterfinals	Semifinals	Final	
Athlete	Event	Opposition Result	Opposition Result	Opposition Result	Opposition Result	Rank
Endre Major	Men's individual C1	—N/a	Borgato (ITA); W 3-1	Davies (GBR); L 1-3	Did not advance	3rd place, bronze medalist(s)
Péter Pálos	Men's individual C11	Leung (HKG); W 3-1	Creange (FRA); W 3-0	Chen (TPE); L 0-3	Did not advance	3rd place, bronze medalist(s)
Zsófia Arlóy	Women's individual C8	Elsayed (EGY); W 3-0	Wolf (GER); L 1-3	Did not advance		
Alexa Szvitacs	Women's individual C9	—N/a	Rauen (BRA); W 3-2	Pek (POL); L 0-3	Did not advance	3rd place, bronze medalist(s)
Zsófia Arlóy; Alexa Szvitacs	Women's double C20	Liu / Mao (CHN); L 2-3	Did not advance			

== Wheelchair fencing ==
Athlete	Event	Round of 32	Round of 16	Quarterfinals	Repechage Rnd 1	Repechage Rnd 2	Repechage Rnd 3	Semifinals	Repechage Rnd 4	Final/BM	
Athlete	Event	Opposition Result	Opposition Result	Opposition Result	Opposition Result	Opposition Result	Opposition Result	Opposition Result	Opposition Result	Opposition Result	Rank
Richárd Osváth	Men's sabre A	—N/a	Damasceno (BRA); W 15-7	Schmidt (GER); L 10-15	Bye	Kano (JPN); L 11-15	Did not advance				
Richárd Osváth	Men's foil A	—N/a	Damasceno (BRA); W 15-2	Akkaya (TUR); L 14-15	Bye	Pender (POL); W 15-5	Lam-Watson (GBR); W 15-14	Bye	Zhong (CHN); L 4-15	Did not advance	
István Tarjányi	Men's sabre B	—N/a	Alderete (ARG); W 15-8	Feng (CHN); L 9-15	Bye	Castro (RPT); W 15-6	Valet (FRA); L 12-15	Did not advance			
István Tarjányi	Men's épée B	—N/a	Zhang (CHN); L 9-15	Bye	Castro (RPT); L 4-15	Did not advance					
Amarilla Veres	Women's sabre A	—N/a	Breus (UKR); W 15-9	Drozdz (POL); L 4-15	Bye	Mogos (ITA); W 15-9	Morkvych (UKR); L 2-15	Did not advance			
Amarilla Veres	Women's épée A	—N/a	Drozdz (POL); W 15-10	Zou (CHN); W 15-7	Bye			Kwon (KOR); L 13-15	Fidrych (POL); L 8-15	Did not advance	
Éva Hajmási	Women's sabre A	—N/a	Oliveira (BRA); W 15-2	Morkvych (UKR); W 15-14	Bye			Drozdz (POL); L 12-15	Vide (FRA); L 12-15	Did not advance	
Éva Hajmási	Women's foil A	—N/a	Delavoipiere (FRA); W 15-2	Zou (CHN); L 12-15	Bye	Morkvych (UKR); L 10-15	Did not advance				
Boglárka Mező	Women's sabre B	—N/a	Ao (CHN); W 15-5	Xiao (CHN); L 4-15	Bye	Doloh (UKR); W 15-6	Pacek (POL); W 15-6	Bye	Fedota-Isaieva (UKR); L 12-15	Did not advance	
Boglárka Mező	Women's foil B	—N/a	Sakurai (JPN); DNS	Did not advance							
Zsuzsanna Krajnyák	Women's foil A	—N/a	Zou (CHN); L 8-15	Bye	Delavoipiere (FRA); W 15-4	Trigilia (ITA); W 15-13	Kwon (KOR); W 15-14	Bye	Rodriguez Menendez (ESP); L 10-15	Did not advance	
Zsuzsanna Krajnyák	Women's épée A	Nakprasit (THA); W 15-7	Collis (GBR); L 12-15	Bye	Drozdz (POL); L 14-15	Did not advance					
Éva Hajmási; Zsuzsanna Krajnyák; Boglárka Mező; Amarilla Veres	Women's team foil	—N/a	Bye	France (FRA); W 45–19	—N/a			Hong Kong (HKG); W 45–29	—N/a	China (CHN); L 34–45	2nd place, silver medalist(s)
Éva Hajmási; Zsuzsanna Krajnyák; Boglárka Mező; Amarilla Veres	Women's team épée	—N/a	Bye	China (CHN); L 27–45	Did not advance						

== See also ==
- Hungary at the 2024 Summer Olympics
- Hungary at the Paralympics
