= Hungary at the 2020 Summer Paralympics =

- IPC code: HUN
- NPC: Hungarian Paralympic Committee

in Tokyo, Japan
- Competitors: 37 in 10 sports
- Flag bearer (opening): Gyöngyi Dani
- Flag bearer (closing): Luca Ekler
- Medals Ranked 18th: Gold 7 Silver 5 Bronze 4 Total 16

Summer Paralympics appearances (overview)
- 1972; 1976; 1980; 1984; 1988; 1992; 1996; 2000; 2004; 2008; 2012; 2016; 2020; 2024

Hungary competed at the 2020 Summer Paralympics in Tokyo, Japan, between 24 August and 5 September 2021. This was Hungary's twelfth appearance at the Summer Paralympics.

== Medalists ==
Medal	Name	Sport	Event	Date
Gold	Amarilla Veres	Wheelchair fencing	Women's épée A	26 August
Gold	Péter Pálos	Table tennis	Men's individual – Class 11	29 August
Gold	Fanni Illés	Swimming	Women's 100 metre backstroke SB4	29 August
Gold	Luca Ekler	Athletics	Women's long jump T38	31 August
Gold	Zsófia Konkoly	Swimming	Women's 100 metre butterfly S9	2 September
Gold	Bianka Pap	Swimming	Women's 100 metre backstroke S10	2 September
Gold	Péter Pál Kiss	Paracanoeing	Men's KL1	3 September
Silver	Zsófia Konkoly	Swimming	Women's 400 metre freestyle S9	25 August
Silver	Richárd Osváth	Wheelchair fencing	Men's foil A	28 August
Silver	Bianka Pap	Swimming	Women's 400 metre freestyle S10	1 September
Silver	Zsófia Konkoly	Swimming	Women's 200 metre individual SM9	1 September
Silver	Bianka Pap	Swimming	Women's 200 metre individual medley SM10	3 September
Bronze	Alexa Szvitacs	Table tennis	Women's individual class 9	28 August
Bronze	Zsuzsanna Krajnyák; Éva Hajmási; Gyöngyi Dani	Wheelchair fencing	Women's foil team	29 August
Bronze	Krisztina Dávid	Shooting	Women's P2 10 metre air pistol SH1	31 August
Bronze	Katalin Varga	Paracanoeing	Women's KL2	4 September

== Competitors ==
The following is the list of number of competitors participating in the Games:

Sport	Men	Women	Total
Archery	1	0	1
Athletics	1	3	4
Cycling	2	0	2
Paracanoeing	4	2	6
Powerlifting	1	0	1
Shooting	1	1	2
Swimming	1	6	7
Table Tennis	4	2	6
Triathlon	0	1	1
Wheelchair Fencing	2	5	7
Total	17	20	37

== Archery ==
Athlete	Event	Ranking round		Round of 32	Round of 16	Quarterfinals	Semifinals	Finals	
Athlete	Event	Score	Seed	Opposition score	Opposition score	Opposition score	Opposition score	Opposition score	Rank
Tamás Gáspár	Men's individual recurve W1	647	4	—N/a		Hekimoğlu (TUR); L 135–138	Did not advance		

== Athletics ==
Hungary allocated five quotas in athletics.

Track events

Athlete	Event	Heats		Final	
Athlete	Event	Result	Rank	Result	Rank
Bernadett Biacsi	Women's 1500m T20	—N/a		4:58.41	8
Ilona Biacsi	Women's 1500m T20	—N/a		4:53.36	5
Luca Ekler	Women's 100m T38	12.94	3 Q	12.82	4

Field events

Athlete	Event	Final	
Athlete	Event	Result	Rank
István Szőllősi	Men's shot put F20	13.59	5
Luca Ekler	Women's long jump T38	5.63 WR	1st place, gold medalist(s)

== Cycling ==
Two cyclists qualified to compete.

Athlete	Event	Final	
Athlete	Event	Result	Rank
Robert Ocelka; Guide: Gergely Nagy	Men's road race B	LAP	7
Robert Ocelka; Guide: Gergely Nagy	Men's road time trial B	1:00:54.97	8
Zsombor Wermeser	Men's road race C4–5	2:34:30	14
Zsombor Wermeser	Men's road time trial C5	46:23.06	7

== Paracanoe ==
Tamás Juhász, Erik Kiss, Péter Pál Kiss, Erika Pulai, András Rozbora and Katalin Varga qualified to compete.

Athlete	Event	Heats		Semifinals		Final	
Athlete	Event	Result	Rank	Result	Rank	Result	Rank
Tamás Juhász	Men's KL1	52.820	3	50.465	1	52.590	6
Péter Pál Kiss	Men's KL1	48.058	1	bye		45.447	1st place, gold medalist(s)
András Rozbora	Men's KL2	49.465	7	47.066	5	49.105	12
Erik Kiss	Men's KL3	42.864	6	42.033	3	44.210	8
Tamás Juhász	Men's VL2	58.699	5	55.818	2	57.193	8
Erika Pulai	Women's KL1	1:08.790	6	1:08.043	5	Did not advance	
Katalin Varga	Women's KL2	55.317	2	53.658	1	52.622	3rd place, bronze medalist(s)

== Paratriathlon ==
Athlete	Event	Swim	Trans 1	Bike	Trans 2	Run	Total time	Rank	
Athlete	Event	Petra Lévay	Women's PTS5	15:50	1:17	37:02	1:02	24:12	9

== Powerlifting ==
Sedric Roussel qualified to compete.

Athlete	Event	Final	
Athlete	Event	Result	Rank
Sedric Roussel	Men's 88 kg	181 kg	6

== Shooting ==
Hungary entered two athletes into the Paralympic competition. Krisztina Dávid will contest in her second Paralympics while Gyula Gurisatti will be at his debut Games.

Athlete	Event	Qualification		Final	
Athlete	Event	Score	Rank	Score	Rank
Krisztina Dávid	Women's P2 – 10 m air pistol SH1				
Gyula Gurisatti	Mixed P4 – 50m pistol SH1				

== Swimming ==
Seven Hungarian swimmers qualified to compete at the Summer Paralympics after participating at the 2019 World Para Swimming Championships where four medals were won and their MQS swimming times were achieved.

Men

Athlete	Event	Heats		Final	
Athlete	Event	Result	Rank	Result	Rank
Bence Iván	100m breaststroke SB6	1:28.54	14	Did not advance	
Bence Iván	200m individual medley SM6	2:52.46	9	Did not advance	

Women

Athlete	Event	Heats		Final	
Athlete	Event	Result	Rank	Result	Rank
Zsanett Adámi	50m backstroke S2	1:27.13	7 Q	1:27.48	7
Zsanett Adámi	100m backstroke S2	3:09.16	7 Q	3:11.88	7
Fanni Illés	400m freestyle S6	5:59.05	11	Did not advance	
Fanni Illés	100m backstroke S6	1:36.58	13	Did not advance	
Fanni Illés	100m breaststroke SB4	1:44.68	1 Q	1:44.41	1st place, gold medalist(s)
Fanni Illés	200m individual medley SM6	3:28.26	12	Did not advance	
Zsofia Konkoly	100m freestyle S9	1:04.86	9	Did not advance	
Zsofia Konkoly	400m freestyle S9	4:44.74	1 Q	4:36.76	2nd place, silver medalist(s)
Zsofia Konkoly	100m backstroke S9	—N/a		1:14.38	6
Zsofia Konkoly	100m butterfly S9	1:07.05 ER	1 Q	1:06.55 ER	1st place, gold medalist(s)
Zsofia Konkoly	200m individual medley SM9	2:35.16	2 Q	2:33.00	2nd place, silver medalist(s)
Bianka Pap	100m freestyle S10	1:01.46	2 Q	1:00.80	4
Bianka Pap	400m freestyle S10	—N/a		4:29.83	2nd place, silver medalist(s)
Bianka Pap	100m backstroke S10	—N/a		1:06.70	1st place, gold medalist(s)
Bianka Pap	100m breaststroke SB9	1:23.45	7 Q	1:22.00	7
Bianka Pap	200m individual medley SM10	2:33.10	4 Q	2:26.12	2nd place, silver medalist(s)
Kata Payer	400m freestyle S9	5:23.14	14	Did not advance	
Kata Payer	200m individual medley SM9	2:57.29	16	Did not advance	
Evelin Száraz	400m freestyle S6	5:58.09	10	Did not advance	
Evelin Száraz	100m backstroke S6	1:41.30	14	Did not advance	
Evelin Száraz	100m breaststroke SB6	1:42.04	6 Q	1:41.19	6
Fanni Illés; Zsófia Konkoly; Bianka Pap; Kata Payer	4 × 100 m freestyle relay 34pts	—N/a		4:38.66	5

== Table tennis ==
Hungary entered four athletes into the table tennis competition at the games. Alexa Szvitacs qualified from the 2019 ITTF European Para Championships which was held in Helsingborg, Sweden and other three athletes qualified via World Ranking allocation.

Men

Athlete	Event	Group Stage			Round 1	Quarterfinals	Semifinals	Final	
Athlete	Event	Opposition Result	Opposition Result	Rank	Opposition Result	Opposition Result	Opposition Result	Opposition Result	Rank
Endre Major	Individual C1								
András Csonka	Individual C8								
Péter Pálos	Individual C11								

Women

Athlete	Event	Group Stage			Round 1	Quarterfinals	Semifinals	Final	
Athlete	Event	Opposition Result	Opposition Result	Rank	Opposition Result	Opposition Result	Opposition Result	Opposition Result	Rank
Zsófia Arlóy	Individual C8								
Alexa Szvitacs	Individual C9								

== Wheelchair fencing ==
Gyöngyi Dani, Éva Hajmási, Zsuzsanna Krajnyák, Boglárka Mező, Richárd Osváth, István Tarjányi and Amarilla Veres were all qualified to compete.

== See also ==
- Hungary at the Paralympics
- Hungary at the 2020 Summer Olympics
