= Hungary at the 2012 Summer Paralympics =

- IPC code: HUN
- NPC: Hungarian Paralympic Committee
- Website: www.hparalimpia.hu

in London
- Competitors: 33 in 9 sports
- Flag bearers: Bernadett Biacsi and Ilona Biacsi
- Medals Ranked 38th: Gold 2 Silver 6 Bronze 6 Total 14

Summer Paralympics appearances (overview)
- 1972; 1976; 1980; 1984; 1988; 1992; 1996; 2000; 2004; 2008; 2012; 2016; 2020; 2024

Hungary competed at the 2012 Summer Paralympics in London, United Kingdom from August 29 to September 9, 2012.

== Medalists ==
The following Hungarian competitors won medals at the Games.

Medal	Name	Sport	Event	Date
Gold	Tamás Sors	Swimming	Men's 100 metre butterfly S9	30 August
Gold	Péter Pálos	Table tennis	Men's individual – Class 11	3 September
Silver	Tamás Sors	Swimming	Men's 400m Freestyle - S9	4 September
Silver	Gyöngyi Dani	Fencing	Wheelchair fencing – Women's foil B	4 September
Silver	Zsuzsanna Krajnyák	Fencing	Wheelchair fencing – Women's épée A	5 September
Silver	Tamás Tóth	Swimming	Men's 50 metre freestyle S9	5 September
Silver	Veronika Juhász; Zsuzsanna Krajnyák; Gyöngyi Dani	Fencing	Women's team open	7 September
Silver	Tamás Tóth	Swimming	Men's 100 metre freestyle S9	7 September
Bronze	Nikolett Szabó	Judo	Judo - Women's 70 kg	1 September
Bronze	Zsuzsanna Krajnyák	Fencing	Wheelchair fencing – Women's foil A	4 September
Bronze	Richárd Osváth	Fencing	Wheelchair fencing – Men's foil A	4 September
Bronze	Ilona Biacsi	Running	Women's 1500 metres	5 September
Bronze	Zsolt Vereczkei	Fencing	Men's 50 metre backstroke S5	6 September
Bronze	Tamás Sors	Swimming	Men's 100 metre freestyle S9	7 September

== Athletics ==
Men
Track & road events

Athlete	Class	Event	Final	
Athlete	Class	Event	Result	Rank
Csaba Orbán	T12	Marathon	3:01:02	12

Field events

Athlete	Class	Event	Final		
Athlete	Class	Event	Distance	Position	Rank
Zsolt Kanyó	F56	Javelin throw	26.28	699	13

Women
Track & road events

Athlete	Class	Event	Final	
Athlete	Class	Event	Result	Rank
Bernadett Biacsi	T20	1500m	4:42.80	4
Ilona Biacsi	T20	1500m	4:42.31	3rd place, bronze medalist(s)

== Judo ==
Men

Athlete	Event	First round	Semifinals	Repechage	Final / BM	
Athlete	Event	Opposition Result	Opposition Result	Opposition Result	Opposition Result	Rank
Gábor Papp	+100 kg	Araujo (BRA); L 000–002	Did not advance	Nadri (IRI); L 000–001	Did not advance	

Women

Athlete	Event	First round	Semifinals	Repechage	Final / BM	
Athlete	Event	Opposition Result	Opposition Result	Opposition Result	Opposition Result	Rank
Nikolett Szabó	70 kg	Kachan (BLR); W 211–002	Savostyanova (RUS); L 000–020	Did not advance	Ruvalcaba (MEX); W 020–000	3rd place, bronze medalist(s)

== Powerlifting ==
Men

Athlete	Event	Attempts (kg)				Total	Rank
Athlete	Event	1	2	3	4	Total	Rank
Sándor Sas	100 kg	~~195.0~~	~~196.0~~	~~203.0~~		NMR	-
Csaba Szávai	+100 kg	192.0	~~196.0~~	~~196.0~~		192.0	8

== Rowing ==
Women

Athlete	Event	Heats		Repechage		Final	
Athlete	Event	Time	Rank	Time	Rank	Time	Rank
Mónika Lengyel	Single sculls	6:31.85	6 R	6:47.34	5 FB	6:59.16	12

== Shooting ==
Men

Athlete	Event	Qualification		Final	
Athlete	Event	Score	Rank	Score	Rank
Gyula Gurisatti	Men's 10 m air pistol SH1	558	15	Did not advance	
Gyula Gurisatti	Mixed 25 m pistol SH1	545- 4x	18	Did not advance	
Gyula Gurisatti	Mixed 50 m pistol SH1	520	13	Did not advance	

Women

Athlete	Event	Qualification		Final	
Athlete	Event	Score	Rank	Score	Rank
Krisztina Dávid	Women's 10 m air pistol SH1	367	9	Did not advance	
Krisztina Dávid	Mixed 25 m pistol SH1	542- 5x	20	Did not advance	
Krisztina Dávid	Mixed 50 m pistol SH1	517	16	Did not advance	

== Table tennis ==
Men

Athlete	Class	Event	Group stage			Quarterfinal	Semifinal	Final / BM	
Athlete	Class	Event	Opposition Score	Opposition Score	Rank	Opposition Score	Opposition Score	Opposition Score	Rank
András Csonka	C8	Men's single	Jambor (SVK); W 3–2	Rignel (SWE); W 3–0	1	Zhao (CHN); L 0–3	Did not advance		
Dezső Berecki	C10	Men's single	Abdelwahab (EGY); W 3–0	Andersson (SWE); L 1–3	1	Ruiz Reyes (ESP); L 2–3	Did not advance		5
Péter Pálos	C11	Men's single	Kinoshita (JPN); W 3–0	Byeongjun (KOR); L 1–3	2	—	Pereira-Leal (FRA); W 3–1	Byeongjun (KOR); W 3–1	1st place, gold medalist(s)
Dezső Berecki; András Csonka	C9–10	Men's team	—	Lukyanov – Iurii Nozdrunov (RUS); W 3–2		Cardona – Ruiz Reyes (ESP); L 0–3	Did not advance		

== Wheelchair fencing ==
Men

Athlete	Class	Event	Group				Rank	Round of 16	Quarterfinal	Semifinal	Final / BM	
Athlete	Class	Event	Opposition Score	Opposition Score	Opposition Score	Opposition Score	Rank	Opposition Score	Opposition Score	Opposition Score	Opposition Score	Rank
Tamás Juhász	A	Épée	Demchuk (UKR); L 3–5	Yusupov (RUS); L 4–5	Betti (ITA); L 4–5	van der Wege (USA); W 5–2	4	Did not advance				
Gyula Mató	A	Épée	Yanfei (CHN); L 1–5	Noble (FRA); W 5–2	Stancuk (POL); L 2–5	Kavalenia (BLR); W 5–4	4	Noble (FRA); L 15–9	Did not advance			
Gyula Mató	A	Foil	Chen (CHN); L 1–5	Yusupov (RUS); L 2–5	Pender (POL); L 0–5	Betti (ITA); W 5–3	4	Did not advance				
Richárd Osváth	A	Foil	Wing Kin (HKG); L 3–5	Lemoine (FRA); W 5–3	Andreev (RUS); W 5–1	Rodriguez (USA); W 5–0	1	Bye	Wing Kin (HKG); W 15–6	Chen (CHN); L 15–13	Tokatlian (FRA); W 15–7	3rd place, bronze medalist(s)
Pál Szekeres	B	Foil	Latreche (FRA); L 4–5	Daoliang (CHN); L 3–5	Khamatshin (RUS); W 5–4	Moreno (USA); W 5–0	3	Czop (POL); W 15–5	Latreche (FRA); L 11–15	Did not advance		
Team	Open	Men's team	—						China (CHN); L 29–45	classification 5-8th place Ukraine (UKR); L 34–45	7th place match Great Britain (GBR); W 45–12	7

Women

Athlete	Class	Event	Group					Rank	Round of 16	Quarterfinal	Semifinal	Final / BM	
Athlete	Class	Event	Opposition Score	Opposition Score	Opposition Score	Opposition Score	Opposition Score	Rank	Opposition Score	Opposition Score	Opposition Score	Opposition Score	Rank
Zsuzsanna Krajnyák	A	Épée	Wu (CHN); W 5–4	Gorlina (UKR); L 2–5	Fidrych (POL); L 2–5	Lao (MAC); W 5–2	Fan (HKG); W 5–2	4	Bye	Efimova (RUS); W 15–7	Gorlina (UKR); W 15–5	Yu (HKG); L 15–6	2nd place, silver medalist(s)

== Wheelchair tennis ==
Men

Athlete	Event	Round of 64	Round of 32	Round of 16	Quarterfinals	Semifinals	Final / BM	
Athlete	Event	Opposition Score	Opposition Score	Opposition Score	Opposition Score	Opposition Score	Opposition Score	Rank
László Farkas	Men's singles	Fabisiak (POL); W 6–3, 7–5	Ammerlaan (NED); L 2–6, 1–6	Did not advance				
