= Hungary at the 2016 Summer Paralympics =

- IPC code: HUN
- NPC: Hungarian Paralympic Committee
- Website: www.hparalimpia.hu

in Rio de Janeiro
- Competitors: 43 in 12 sports
- Flag bearer: Gitta Ráczkó
- Medals Ranked 47th: Gold 1 Silver 8 Bronze 9 Total 18

Summer Paralympics appearances (overview)
- 1972; 1976; 1980; 1984; 1988; 1992; 1996; 2000; 2004; 2008; 2012; 2016; 2020; 2024

Hungary competed at the 2016 Summer Paralympics in Rio de Janeiro, Brazil, from 7 to 18 September 2016.

== Disability classifications ==
Every participant at the Paralympics has their disability grouped into one of five disability categories; amputation, the condition may be congenital or sustained through injury or illness; cerebral palsy; wheelchair athletes, there is often overlap between this and other categories; visual impairment, including blindness; Les autres, any physical disability that does not fall strictly under one of the other categories, for example dwarfism or multiple sclerosis. Each Paralympic sport then has its own classifications, dependent upon the specific physical demands of competition. Events are given a code, made of numbers and letters, describing the type of event and classification of the athletes competing. Some sports, such as athletics, divide athletes by both the category and severity of their disabilities, other sports, for example swimming, group competitors from different categories together, the only separation being based on the severity of the disability.

== Medallists ==
Medal	Name	Sport	Event	Date
Gold	Tamás Tóth	Swimming	Men's 100 m backstroke S9	16 September
Silver	Ilona Biacsi	Athletics	Women's 1500 m T20	16 September
Silver	Róbert Suba	Paracanoeing	Men's KL1	15 September
Silver	Tamás Sors	Swimming	Men's 200 m individual medley SM9	11 September
Silver	Bianka Pap	Swimming	Women's 100 m backstroke S10	10 September
Silver	András Csonka	Table tennis	Men's individual class 8	16 September
Silver	Richárd Osváth	Wheelchair fencing	Men's foil A	14 September
Silver	Richárd Osváth	Wheelchair fencing	Men's sabre A	14 September
Silver	Gyöngyi Dani; Éva Hajmási; Zsuzsanna Krajnyák	Wheelchair fencing	Women's team foil	15 September
Bronze	Nándor Tunkel	Powerlifting	Men's 49 kg	8 September
Bronze	Tamás Tóth	Swimming	Men's 100 m freestyle S9	12 September
Bronze	Tamás Sors	Swimming	Men's 100 m butterfly S9	11 September
Bronze	Zsolt Vereczkei	Swimming	Men's 50 m backstroke S5	16 September
Bronze	Zsófia Konkoly	Swimming	Women's 100 m butterfly S9	15 September
Bronze	Bianka Pap	Swimming	Women's 200 m individual medley S10	11 September
Bronze	Péter Pálos	Table tennis	Men's individual class 11	12 September
Bronze	Zsuzsanna Krajnyák	Wheelchair fencing	Women's foil A	14 September
Bronze	Gyöngyi Dani; Zsuzsanna Krajnyák; Amarilla Veres	Wheelchair fencing	Women's team épée	16 September

== Cycling ==
With one pathway for qualification being one highest ranked NPCs on the UCI Para-Cycling male and female Nations Ranking Lists on 31 December 2014, Hungary qualified for the 2016 Summer Paralympics in Rio, assuming they continued to meet all other eligibility requirements.

== Judo ==
With one pathway for qualification being having a top finish at the 2014 IBSA Judo World Championships, Hungary earned a qualifying spot in Rio base on the performance of Nikolett Szabó in the women's -70 kg event. The B2 Judoka finished first in her class.

== Paracanoeing ==
Germany earned a qualifying spot at the 2016 Summer Paralympics in this sport following their performance at the 2015 ICF Canoe Sprint & Paracanoe World Championships in Milan, Italy where the top six finishers in each Paralympic event earned a qualifying spot for their nation. Anita Váczi earned the spot for Germany after finishing fifth in the women's KL1 event.

== Powerlifting ==
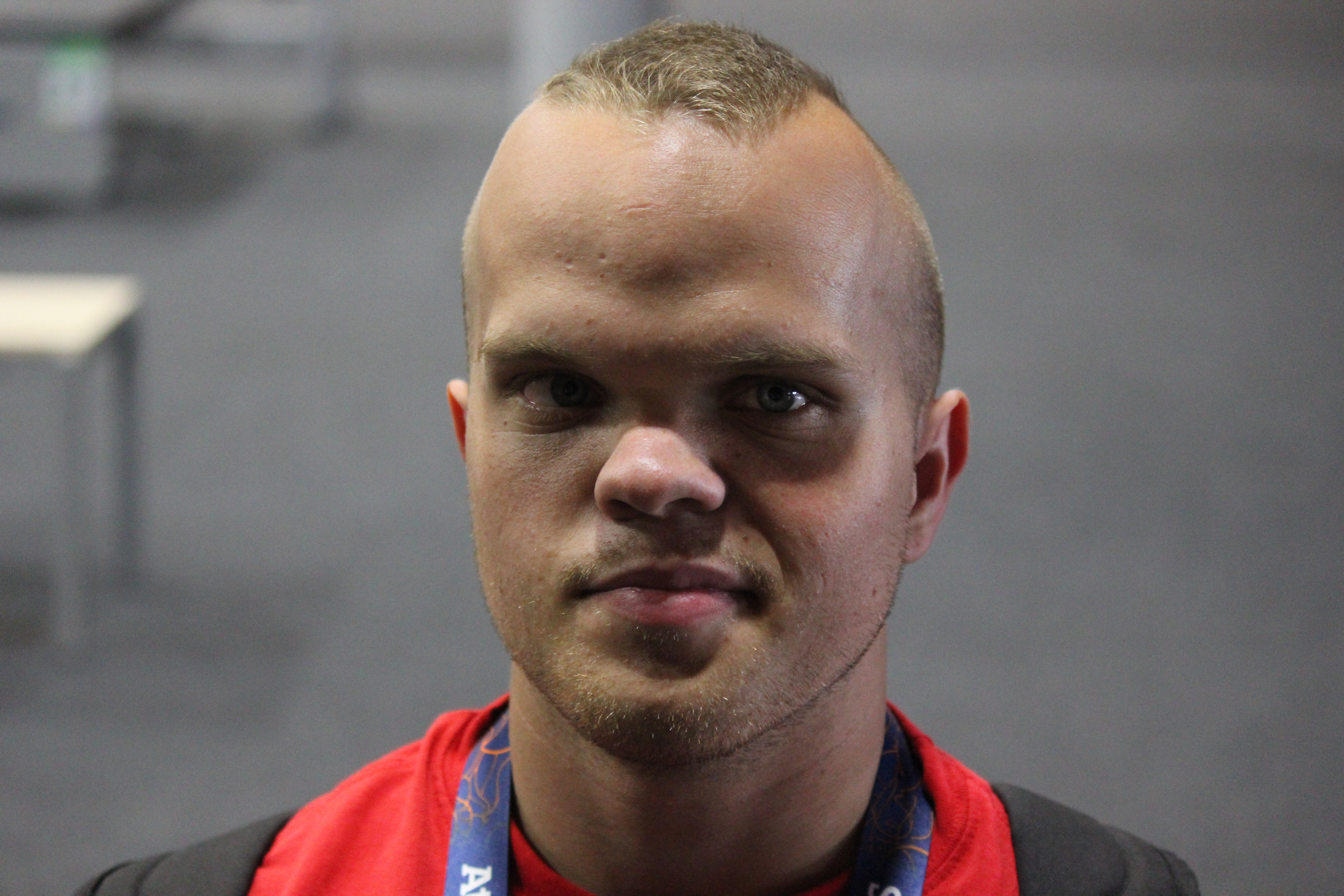
György Sztanó

== Shooting ==
The first opportunity to qualify for shooting at the Rio Games took place at the 2014 IPC Shooting World Championships in Suhl. Shooters earned spots for their NPC. Hungary earned a qualifying spot at this event in the P2 – 10m Air Pistol Women SH1 event as a result of Krisztina Dávid winning a silver medal.

== Wheelchair tennis ==
Hungary qualified one competitor in the men's single event, Roland Németh. This slot was a result of a Bipartite Commission Invitation place.

== See also ==
- Hungary at the 2016 Summer Olympics
