= Hungary at the 1996 Summer Paralympics =

- IPC code: HUN
- NPC: Hungarian Paralympic Committee
- Website: www.hparalimpia.hu

in Atlanta
- Competitors: 42 (32 men and 10 women)
- Medals Ranked 29th: Gold 5 Silver 2 Bronze 3 Total 10

Summer Paralympics appearances (overview)
- 1972; 1976; 1980; 1984; 1988; 1992; 1996; 2000; 2004; 2008; 2012; 2016; 2020; 2024

42 athletes (32 men and 10 women) from Hungary competed at the 1996 Summer Paralympics in Atlanta, United States.

== Medallists ==
Medal	Name	Sport	Event
Gold	Zsolt Vereczkei	Swimming	Men's 50m backstroke S5
Gold	Diana Zambo; Gitta Raczko; Monika Jaromi; Katalin Engelhardt	Swimming	Women's 4x50m medley S1-6
Gold	Ilona Sasváriné Paulik	Table tennis	Women's singles 3
Gold	Pál Szekeres	Wheelchair fencing	Men's foil individual B
Gold	Pál Szekeres	Wheelchair fencing	Men's sabre individual B
Silver	Monika Jaromi	Swimming	Women's 50m butterfly S5
Silver	Judit Palfi	Wheelchair fencing	Women's foil individual B
Bronze	Katalin Engelhardt	Swimming	Women's 50m butterfly S5
Bronze	Gitta Raczko	Swimming	Women's 100m breaststroke SB5
Bronze	Katalin Engelhardt	Swimming	Women's 200m medley SM5

== See also ==
- Hungary at the Paralympics
- Hungary at the 1996 Summer Olympics
