= Judo at the 2012 Summer Paralympics – Women's 70 kg =

Judo – Women's 70 kg at the XIV Paralympic Games
- Venue: ExCeL London
- Date: 1 September 2012
- Competitors: 7 from 7 nations

Medalists
1st place, gold medalist(s)		Carmen Herrera	Spain
2nd place, silver medalist(s)		Tatiana Savostyanova	Russia
3rd place, bronze medalist(s)		Zhou Qian	China
3rd place, bronze medalist(s)		Nikolett Szabó	Hungary

The women's 70 kg judo competition at the 2012 Summer Paralympics was held on 1 September at ExCeL London.

== Results ==
First Round
Arina Kachan (BLR)	0002
Nikolett Szabo (HUN)	0211
Tatiana Savostyanova (RUS)
BYE
Zhou Qian (CHN)	022
Christella Garcia (USA)	000
Carmen Herrera (ESP)	004
Lenia Ruvalcaba (MEX)	0002

Semifinals
Nikolett Szabo (HUN)	000
Tatiana Savostyanova (RUS)	020
Zhou Qian (CHN)	0002
Carmen Herrera (ESP)	001

Final
Tatiana Savostyanova (RUS)	0002
Carmen Herrera (ESP)	022

=== Repechage ===
Repechage
Arina Kachan (BLR)
Christella Garcia (USA)	0002
Lenia Ruvalcaba (MEX)	112

Bronze medal finals
Arina Kachan (BLR)	0003
Zhou Qian (CHN)	0221
Lenia Ruvalcaba (MEX)	000
Nikolett Szabo (HUN)	020
