= Hungary at the 2000 Summer Paralympics =

- IPC code: HUN
- NPC: Hungarian Paralympic Committee
- Website: www.hparalimpia.hu

in Sydney
- Competitors: 55 (42 male, 13 female)
- Medals Ranked 32nd: Gold 4 Silver 5 Bronze 14 Total 23

Summer Paralympics appearances (overview)
- 1972; 1976; 1980; 1984; 1988; 1992; 1996; 2000; 2004; 2008; 2012; 2016; 2020; 2024

There were 13 female and 42 male athletes representing the country at the 2000 Summer Paralympics.

== Medal table ==
Medal	Name	Sport	Event
Gold	Zsolt Vereczkei	Swimming	Men's 50m backstroke S5
Gold	Krisztián Sánta	Swimming	Men's 100m backstroke S14
Gold	Gabor Majer; Janos Racz; Tibor Szedoe; Krisztian Santa	Swimming	Men's 4x50m medley relay S14
Gold	Dóra Pásztory	Swimming	Women's 200m individual medley SM8
Silver	Krisztián Sánta	Swimming	Men's 50m butterfly S14
Silver	Krisztián Sánta	Swimming	Men's 50m freestyle S14
Silver	Krisztián Sánta	Swimming	Men's 100m freestyle S14
Silver	Janos Becsey	Swimming	Men's 200m individual medley SM7
Silver	Judit Pálfi	Wheelchair fencing	Women's épée individual B
Bronze	Sándor Ponyori	Athletics	Men's long jump F20
Bronze	Gábor Vincze	Judo	Men's -81 kg
Bronze	Ervin Kovacs	Swimming	Men's 50m butterfly S5
Bronze	Tibor Szedoe	Swimming	Men's 50m butterfly S14
Bronze	Ervin Kovacs	Swimming	Men's 50m freestyle S5
Bronze	Ervin Kovacs	Swimming	Men's 100m breaststroke SB4
Bronze	Janos Racz	Swimming	Men's 100m breaststroke SB14
Bronze	Krisztián Sánta	Swimming	Men's 200m individual medley SM14
Bronze	Katalin Engelhardt	Swimming	Women's 50m butterfly S5
Bronze	Dóra Pásztory	Swimming	Women's 100m butterfly S8
Bronze	Pál Szekeres	Wheelchair fencing	Men's foil individual B
Bronze	Zsuzsanna Krajnyak	Wheelchair fencing	Women's foil individual A

== See also ==
- Hungary at the 2000 Summer Olympics
- Hungary at the Paralympics

== Bibliography ==
- International Paralympic Committee (2000). "Appendix C: Athlete Numbers - By Delegation". Sydney 2000 Paralympic Games Post Games Report. Sydney.
