= Athletics at the 1972 Summer Paralympics – Men's 60 metres wheelchair 1A =

Men's 60 m wheelchair 1A at the IV Paralympic Games
- Paralympic Athletics
- Competitors: 12 from 8 nations

Medalists
| 1st place, gold medalist(s) | | Jan Erik Stenberg | Norway |
| 2nd place, silver medalist(s) | | Douglas Bovee | Canada |
| 3rd place, bronze medalist(s) | | András Fejes | Hungary |

The Men's 60 m wheelchair 1A was one of the events held in Athletics at the 1972 Summer Paralympics in Heidelberg.

There were 17 competitors in the heat; 5 made it into the final.

Jan Erik Stenberg of Norway won the gold medal.

== Results ==
=== Heats ===
| Rank | Athlete | Time |
|---|---|---|
| 1 | Jan Erik Stenberg (NOR) | 27.7 |
| 2 | Douglas Bovee (CAN) | 33.1 |
| 3 | Sackerer (FRG) | 33.5 |
| 4 | András Fejes (HUN) | 34.6 |
| 5 | Rainer Kueschall (SUI) | 35.4 |
| 6 | Rod Vleiger (USA) | 35.5 |
| 7 | Hans Rosenast (SUI) | 38.4 |
| 8 | Wauters (BEL) | 44.1 |
| 9 | Edund Weber (FRG) | 44.1 |
| 10 | Cliff Rickard (AUS) | 49.3 |
| 11 | Nichol (USA) | 55.6 |
| 12 | J. Reichart (CAN) | 58.7 |

=== Final ===
| Rank | Athlete | Time |
|---|---|---|
| 1st place, gold medalist(s) | Jan Erik Stenberg (NOR) | 23.5 |
| 2nd place, silver medalist(s) | Douglas Bovee (CAN) | 26.4 |
| 3rd place, bronze medalist(s) | András Fejes (HUN) | 27.5 |
| 4 | Rainer Kueschall (SUI) | 28.4 |
| 5 | Sackerer (FRG) | 30.6 |
