= András Fejes =

András Fejes may refer to:

- András Fejes (athlete) (1946–2020), Hungarian paralympic athlete and table tennis player
- András Fejes (footballer) (born 1988), Hungarian footballer
