= Swimming at the 2016 Summer Paralympics – Men's 200 metre individual medley SM9 =

Men's 200 metre individual medley SM9 at the XV Paralympic Games
- Venue: Olympic Aquatics Stadium
- Dates: 11 September 2016
- Competitors: 14 from 11 nations

Medalists
| 1st place, gold medalist(s) | | Federico Morlacchi | Italy |
| 2nd place, silver medalist(s) | | Tamás Sors | Hungary |
| 3rd place, bronze medalist(s) | | Timothy Disken | Australia |

The Men's 200 metre individual medley SM9 event at the 2016 Paralympic Games took place on 11 September 2016, at the Olympic Aquatics Stadium. Two heats were held. The swimmers with the eight fastest times advanced to the final.

== Heats ==
=== Heat 1 ===
9:49 11 September 2016:

| Rank | Lane | Name | Nationality | Time | Notes |
|---|---|---|---|---|---|
| 1 | 4 | Tamás Tóth | Hungary | 2:20.34 | Q |
| 2 | 5 | Brenden Hall | Australia | 2:21.74 | Q |
| 3 | 6 | Timothy Hodge | Australia | 2:22.23 | Q |
| 4 | 3 | Cody Bureau | United States | 2:23.95 | Q |
| 5 | 2 | Lucas Mozela | Brazil | 2:24.71 | |
| 6 | 1 | Marco Pulleiro | Argentina | 2:31.68 | |

=== Heat 2 ===
9:54 11 September 2016:

| Rank | Lane | Name | Nationality | Time | Notes |
|---|---|---|---|---|---|
| 1 | 5 | Timothy Disken | Australia | 2:18.86 | Q |
| 2 | 6 | Tamás Sors | Hungary | 2:18.97 | Q |
| 3 | 4 | Federico Morlacchi | Italy | 2:20.15 | Q |
| 4 | 3 | James Crisp | Great Britain | 2:22.72 | Q |
| 5 | 2 | Dimosthenis Michalentzakis | Greece | 2:26.15 | |
| 6 | 7 | Oscar Salguero Galisteo | Spain | 2:27.07 | |
| 7 | 1 | Patryk Biskup | Poland | 2:28.59 | |
| 8 | 8 | Hyun Kwon | South Korea | 2:46.52 | |

== Final ==
17:45 11 September 2016:

| Rank | Lane | Name | Nationality | Time | Notes |
|---|---|---|---|---|---|
| 1st place, gold medalist(s) | 3 | Federico Morlacchi | Italy | 2:16.72 | |
| 2nd place, silver medalist(s) | 5 | Tamás Sors | Hungary | 2:17.33 | |
| 3rd place, bronze medalist(s) | 4 | Timothy Disken | Australia | 2:17.72 | |
| 4 | 6 | Tamás Tóth | Hungary | 2:19.40 | |
| 5 | 7 | Timothy Hodge | Australia | 2:21.14 | |
| 6 | 8 | Cody Bureau | United States | 2:24.63 | |
| 7 | 1 | James Crisp | Great Britain | 2:24.96 | |
| | 2 | Brenden Hall | Australia | | DSQ |
