= Hungary at the 1984 Summer Paralympics =

- IPC code: HUN
- NPC: Hungarian Paralympic Committee
- Website: www.hparalimpia.hu

in Stoke Mandeville/New York
- Competitors: 26
- Medals Ranked 18th: Gold 13 Silver 12 Bronze 3 Total 28

Summer Paralympics appearances (overview)
- 1972; 1976; 1980; 1984; 1988; 1992; 1996; 2000; 2004; 2008; 2012; 2016; 2020; 2024

Hungary competed at the 1984 Summer Paralympics in Stoke Mandeville, Great Britain and New York City, United States. 26 competitors from Hungary won 29 medals including 13 gold, 11 silver and 5 bronze and finished 18th in the medal table.

== See also ==
- Hungary at the Paralympics
- Hungary at the 1984 Summer Olympics
