= Judo at the 2004 Summer Paralympics – Women's 70 kg =

Judo - Women's up to 70 kg at the XII Paralympic Games
- Paralympic Judo
- Venue: Ano Liossia Olympic Hall
- Dates: 20 September 2004
- Competitors: 6 from 6 nations

Medalists
1st place, gold medalist(s)		Carmen Herrera	Spain
2nd place, silver medalist(s)		Lorena Pierce	United States
3rd place, bronze medalist(s)		Sandorne Nagy	Hungary
3rd place, bronze medalist(s)		Tatiana Savostyanova	Russia

The Women's up to 70 kg judo competition at the 2004 Summer Paralympics was held on 20 September at the Ano Liossia Olympic Hall.

The tournament bracket consisted of a single-elimination contest culminating in a gold medal match. There was also a repechage to determine the winners of the two bronze medals. The losing quarter-finalists competed in the repechage, and the two judokas who lost in the semifinals faced the winner of the opposite half of the bracket's repechage in bronze medal bouts.

The event was won by Carmen Herrera, representing Spain.

== Results ==
The four digits represent scores of ippon, waza-ari, yuko and koka (which was still used at the time). A letter indicates a penalty of shido, chui, keikoku or hansoku make, which (at the time) also registered a score of koka, yuko, waza-ari or ippon, respectively, to the opponent. Penalties are escalated, thus 2 shido = chui, 3 shido = keikoku, 4 shido = hansoku make, save that a penalty of hansoku make direct results in exclusion from the remainder of the competition, while if it results from escalation it does not.

=== Competition bracket ===
Quarterfinals
Pornsiri Trachu (THA)	0000
Lorena Pierce (USA)	1000
Sandorne Nagy (HUN)	0000
Carmen Herrera (ESP)	0020

Semifinals
Dlanny Bagu (MAS)	0000
Lorena Pierce (USA)	1000
Tatiana Savostyanova (RUS)	0010
Carmen Herrera (ESP)	1030

Finals
Lorena Pierce (USA)	0000
Carmen Herrera (ESP)	1100

=== Repechage ===
Bronze medal matches
Pornsiri Trachu (THA)	0000
Tatiana Savostyanova (RUS)	1000
Sandorne Nagy (HUN)	1000
Dlanny Bagu (MAS)	0000
