= Wheelchair fencing at the 2012 Summer Paralympics =

Wheelchair fencing at the XIV Paralympic Games
- Venue: ExCeL
- Dates: 4 – 8 September 2012
- Competitors: 105 from 24 nations

Wheelchair fencing at the 2012 Summer Paralympics was held in the ExCeL from 4 September to 8 September 2012.

== Classification ==
Fencers were given a classification depending on the type and extent of their disability. The classification system allows fencers to compete against others with a similar level of function. Fencing has two classes, A and B. Wheelchairs were anchored to the ground during competition.

== Participating nations ==
105 fencers from 24 nations took part in this sport.

- Argentina (1)
- Austria (1)
- Belarus (5)
- Brazil (1)
- Canada (2)
- China (9)
- France (11)
- Germany (1)
- Great Britain (7)
- Greece (4)
- Hong Kong (8)
- Hungary (8)
- Iraq (1)
- Italy (5)
- Kuwait (1)
- Macau (1)
- Malaysia (1)
- Poland (10)
- Russia (12)
- South Korea (1)
- Spain (1)
- Thailand (1)
- Ukraine (7)
- United States (6)

== Medal summary ==
=== Medal table ===
Rank	Nation	Gold	Silver	Bronze	Total
1	China (CHN)	6	3	1	10
2	Hong Kong (HKG)	2	1	4	7
3	Poland (POL)	2	0	1	3
4	Brazil (BRA)	1	0	0	1
4	Thailand (THA)	1	0	0	1
6	France (FRA)	0	3	2	5
6	Hungary (HUN)	0	3	2	5
8	Germany (GER)	0	1	0	1
8	Ukraine (UKR)	0	1	0	1
10	Italy (ITA)	0	0	2	2
Totals (10 entries)		12	12	12	36

== Events ==
The five event types below were competed for both class A and class B, for a total of ten events.

- Men's épée
- Men's foil
- Men's sabre
- Women's épée
- Women's foil

=== Men's events ===
Event	Gold	Silver	Bronze
Men's Épée A	Dariusz Pender; Poland	Romain Noble; France	Matteo Betti; Italy
Men's Épée B	Jovane Silva Guissone; Brazil	Tam Chik Sum; Hong Kong	Alim Latrèche; France
Men's Foil A	Ye Ruyi; China	Chen Yijun; China	Richárd Osváth; Hungary
Men's Foil B	Hu Daoliang; China	Anton Datsko; Ukraine	Alim Latrèche; France
Men's Sabre A	Chen Yijun; China	Tian Jianquan; China	Chan Wing Kin; Hong Kong
Men's Sabre B	Grzegorz Pluta; Poland	Marc-André Cratère; France	Alessio Sarri; Italy
Men's Team	China (CHN); Chen Yijun; Ye Ruyi; Hu Daoliang	France (FRA); Ludovic Lemoine; Alim Latrèche; Damien Tokatlian	Hong Kong (HKG); Wong Tang Tat; Chan Wing Kin; Chung Ting Ching

=== Women's events ===
Event	Gold	Silver	Bronze
Women's Épée A	Yu Chui Yee; Hong Kong	Zsuzsanna Krajnyák; Hungary	Wu Baili; China
Women's Épée B	Saysunee Jana; Thailand	Simone Briese-Baetke; Germany	Chan Yui Chong; Hong Kong
Women's Foil A	Yu Chui Yee; Hong Kong	Wu Baili; China	Zsuzsanna Krajnyák; Hungary
Women's Foil B	Fang Yao; China	Gyöngyi Dani; Hungary	Marta Makowska; Poland
Women's Team Open	China (CHN); Rong Jing; Yao Fang; Wu Baili	Hungary (HUN); Veronika Juhász; Zsuzsanna Krajnyák; Gyöngyi Dani	Hong Kong (HKG); Fan Pui Shan; Yu Chui Yee; Chan Yui Chong
