= Swimming at the 2020 Summer Paralympics – Qualification =

Qualification for swimming at the 2020 Summer Paralympics begin on 1 October 2018 and finish on 31 January 2020. There are 340 male and 280 female athlete quotas in 146 swimming events (76 male, 67 female, 3 mixed relays).

== Timeline ==
Athletes have to compete in at least one of the following competitions in order to be qualified for the Summer Paralympics.

Means of qualification	Date	Venue	Berths
2018 European Championships	13–19 August 2018	(Republic of Ireland) Dublin	—
2019 World Series	15–17 February 2019	(Australia) Melbourne	—
2019 World Series	4–6 April 2019	(United States) Indianapolis	—
2019 World Series	25–27 April 2019	(Brazil) São Paulo	—
2019 World Series	25–28 April 2019	(United Kingdom) Glasgow	—
2019 World Series	10–12 May 2019	Singapore	—
2019 World Series	30 May - 2 June 2019	(Italy) Lignano Sabbiadoro	—
2019 World Series	6–9 June 2019	(Germany) Berlin	—
2019 Parapan American Games	23 August – 1 September 2019	(Peru) Lima	—
2019 World Para Swimming Championships	9–15 September 2019	(United Kingdom) London	278 qualified slots 148 males 130 females
2020 World Series; Most swimming meets were cancelled due to the COVID-19 pandemic	14–16 February 2020	(Australia) Melbourne	—
2020 World Series; Most swimming meets were cancelled due to the COVID-19 pandemic	27 February - 1 March 2020	~~(Italy) Lignano Sabbiadoro~~	—
2020 World Series; Most swimming meets were cancelled due to the COVID-19 pandemic	25–28 March 2020	~~(Brazil) São Paulo~~	—
2020 World Series; Most swimming meets were cancelled due to the COVID-19 pandemic	9–12 April 2020	~~(United Kingdom) Sheffield~~	—
2020 World Series; Most swimming meets were cancelled due to the COVID-19 pandemic	16–18 April 2020	~~(United States) Indianapolis~~	—
2020 World Series; Most swimming meets were cancelled due to the COVID-19 pandemic	1–3 May 2020	~~Singapore~~	—
2020 European Open Championships	16–22 May 2021	(Portugal) Madeira	—
2021 World Series	8–11 April 2021	(United Kingdom) Sheffield	—
2021 World Series	15–17 April 2021	(United States) Lewisville	—
2021 World Series	17–18 April 2021	(Italy) Lignano Sabbiadoro	—
2021 World Series	17–20 June 2021	(Germany) Berlin	—
MQS Slot Allocation	1 October 2018 – 31 January 2020	—	323 qualified slots 187 males 145 females
Bipartite Commission Invitation	15 February - 10 April 2020	—	10 qualified slots 5 males 5 females
Total			620

== Quotas ==
The qualification slots are allocated to the NPC not to the individual athlete. In Bipartite Commission Invitation method, the slot is allocated to the individual athlete not to the NPC. World Para Swimming (WPS) reserves the right to allocate slots to the use of certain sports classes particularly for swimmers with complex needs; the slot shall be used as allocated or the NPC must return the slot to WPS.

- An NPC can allocate a maximum of 34 male and 28 female qualification slots in a maximum of 62 qualification slots. Exceptions may be granted through the Bipartite Invitation Commission method.
- An NPC can enter a maximum of three eligible swimmers per medal event.
- NPCs can enter an athlete who has met at least one MQS (Minimum Qualification Standard) time in any medal event and have met the MET (Minimum Entry Time) to any medal event.
- An NPC can only enter one relay event team as long as they meet the MQS for any of the events. All team members have to be qualified in at least one individual event to be selected in the relay team.

=== Allocated time targets ===
Event	Class	Male		Female	
Event	Class	MQS	MET	MQS	MET
50m freestyle	S3	54.52	1:11.00	—	
50m freestyle	S4	42.97	47.46	47.84	55.62
50m freestyle	S5	36.19	36.84	—	
50m freestyle	S6	—		37.78	38.98
50m freestyle	S7	29.94	31.03	—	
50m freestyle	S8	—		33.61	34.88
50m freestyle	S9	26.74	27.86	—	
50m freestyle	S10	25.47	26.09	28.99	29.88
50m freestyle	S11	28.47	29.23	33.72	35.56
50m freestyle	S13	25.55	26.25	28.88	29.54
100m freestyle	S3	—		2:33.78	4:47.35
100m freestyle	S4	1:37.67	1:56.98	—	
100m freestyle	S5	1:20.70	1:23.81	1:34.86	1:46.15
100m freestyle	S6	1:11.48	1:14.34	—	
100m freestyle	S7	—		1:17.98	1:20.32
100m freestyle	S8	1:01.79	1:03.40	—	
100m freestyle	S9	—		1:05.84	1:07.33
100m freestyle	S10	55.28	57.11	1:03.11	1:04.06
100m freestyle	S11	—		1:15.48	1:18.95
100m freestyle	S12	57.95	1:01.32	1:08.05	1:12.85
200m freestyle	S2	5:28.14	6:23.56	—	
200m freestyle	S3	4:43.70	5:01.06	—	
200m freestyle	S4	3:37.23	4:06.74	—	
200m freestyle	S5	3:02.23	3:05.56	3:33.74	3:59.82
200m freestyle	S14	2:01.29	2:03.63	2:18.21	2:21.20
400m freestyle	S6	5:38.47	5:46.98	5:55.92	6:21.68
400m freestyle	S7	5:08.98	5:17.62	5:46.79	6:02.25
400m freestyle	S8	4:50.25	5:00.35	5:21.68	5:32.35
400m freestyle	S9	4:29.80	4:35.02	5:04.07	5:10.83
400m freestyle	S10	4:20.45	4:24.42	4:49.14	4:54.81
400m freestyle	S11	5:23.76	5:33.76	5:57.51	6:45.53
400m freestyle	S13	4:34.61	4:48.40	4:59.02	5:10.75
50m backstroke	S1	1:53.26	1:53.26	—	
50m backstroke	S2	1:14.55	1:26.31	1:53.58	1:53.58
50m backstroke	S3	59.06	1:07.00	1:14.71	2:12.50
50m backstroke	S4	52.67	56.33	1:03.14	1:12.50
50m backstroke	S5	42.08	43.53	51.08	56.32
100m backstroke	S1	3:54.62	3:54.62	—	
100m backstroke	S2	2:40.18	3:16.79	3:36.93	3:36.93
100m backstroke	S6	1:24.94	1:28.87	1:34.75	1:42.10
100m backstroke	S7	1:19.54	1:21.61	1:30.06	1:32.57
100m backstroke	S8	1:12.78	1:13.85	1:23.99	1:25.84
100m backstroke	S9	1:06.34	1:07.72	1:16.25	1:18.01
100m backstroke	S10	1:03.84	1:05.93	1:14.52	1:15.71
100m backstroke	S11	1:18.95	1:22.21	1:29.09	1:36.31
100m backstroke	S12	1:08.98	1:11.84	1:21.97	1:30.21
100m backstroke	S13	1:04.58	1:08.95	1:13.03	1:17.76
100m backstroke	S14	1:04.40	1:05.30	1:14.58	1:17.69
50m breaststroke	SB2	3:18.37	3:18.37	—	
50m breaststroke	SB3	56.40	1:02.59	1:08.39	1:23.79
100m breaststroke	SB4	1:58.19	2:03.86	2:24.49	2:48.02
100m breaststroke	SB5	1:48.80	1:52.38	1:59.21	2:04.74
100m breaststroke	SB6	1:28.56	1:31.47	1:49.76	1:52.96
100m breaststroke	SB7	1:26.51	1:29.03	1:45.04	1:51.96
100m breaststroke	SB8	1:18.83	1:21.78	1:32.49	1:37.44
100m breaststroke	SB9	1:13.48	1:15.33	1:24.68	1:27.72
100m breaststroke	SB11	1:25.54	1:28.59	1:41.11	1:50.43
100m breaststroke	SB12	1:16.17	1:18.73	1:31.51	1:39.73
100m breaststroke	SB13	1:14.14	1:16.61	1:25.67	1:28.68
100m breaststroke	SB14	1:10.16	1:12.07	1:26.08	1:27.95
50m butterfly	S5	40.61	43.44	56.59	1:21.87
50m butterfly	S6	34.96	36.54	42.49	45.71
50m butterfly	S7	32.90	34.87	40.25	44.46
100m butterfly	S8	1:06.44	1:09.59	1:21.52	1:25.41
100m butterfly	S9	1:03.41	1:04.52	1:12.69	1:16.05
100m butterfly	S10	1:00.97	1:02.66	1:10.35	1:15.98
100m butterfly	S11	1:20.22	1:25.98	—	
100m butterfly	S12	1:03.41	1:08.74	—	
100m butterfly	S13	1:00.84	1:03.33	1:14.58	1:23.23
100m butterfly	S14	59.87	1:00.69	1:11.98	1:14.14
150m individual medley	SM3	4:42.97	6:40.09	—	
150m individual medley	SM4	3:09.71	3:22.69	3:43.55	5:12.98
200m individual medley	SM5	—		4:41.15	6:37.18
200m individual medley	SM6	3:05.82	3:10.89	3:24.27	3:37.81
200m individual medley	SM7	2:51.39	2:57.09	3:22.16	3:42.56
200m individual medley	SM8	2:34.21	2:38.30	3:07.10	3:12.80
200m individual medley	SM9	2:26.50	2:28.49	2:46.53	2:51.84
200m individual medley	SM10	2:18.96	2:27.00	2:36.69	2:42.23
200m individual medley	SM11	2:49.92	2:58.48	3:10.45	3:35.03
200m individual medley	SM13	2:21.49	2:24.38	2:40.48	2:46.99
200m individual medley	SM14	2:17.68	2:19.02	2:40.88	2:43.02
4 × 100 m freestyle relay 34pts		4:40.00		6:15.00	
4 × 100 m medley relay 34pts		5:00.00		6:40.00	
Mixed 4x50m freestyle relay 20pts		3:35.00			
Mixed 4 × 100 m freestyle relay S14		5:00.00			
Mixed 4 × 100 m freestyle relay 49pts		5:30.00			

=== Quotas achieved ===
- Two top medalists in all swimming medal events at the 2019 World Para Swimming Championships will earn a qualification slot for their representing country. As of 15 September 2019.
- Athletes who has achieved an MQS performance at any World Para Swimming recognised competition between 1 October 2018 and 31 January 2020 but didn't achieve a direct allocation at the World Championships will be given an allocation slot for their NPC.

Qualified nation	Quotas achieved 2019 WPSC	Quotas achieved MQS	Total quotas
Argentina (ARG)	—	9	9
Australia (AUS)	9	32	41
Austria (AUT)	—	3	3
Azerbaijan (AZE)	1	3	4
Belgium (BEL)	—	1	1
Belarus (BLR)	3	10	13
Brazil (BRA)	7	35	42
Canada (CAN)	7	19	26
Chile (CHI)	1	2	3
China (CHN)	14	42	56
Colombia (COL)	3	11	14
Croatia (CRO)	1	3	4
Cuba (CUB)	—	1	1
Cyprus (CYP)	—	1	1
Czech Republic (CZE)	1	5	6
Denmark (DEN)	—	1	1
Egypt (EGY)	—	3	3
Estonia (EST)	—	3	3
Finland (FIN)	—	2	2
France (FRA)	3	9	12
Germany (GER)	4	15	19
Great Britain (GBR)	16	33	49
Greece (GRE)	2	10	12
Hong Kong (HKG)	—	4	4
Hungary (HUN)	2	7	9
Iceland (ISL)	—	2	2
Indonesia (INA)	—	1	1
India (IND)	—	1	1
Ireland (IRL)	—	4	4
Israel (ISR)	2	6	8
Italy (ITA)	13	29	42
Japan (JPN)	5	27	32
Kazakhstan (KAZ)	—	6	6
Latvia (LAT)	—	1	1
Lithuania (LTU)	—	1	1
Malaysia (MAS)	—	2	2
Mexico (MEX)	3	18	21
Myanmar (MYA)	—	1	1
Netherlands (NED)	5	15	20
New Zealand (NZL)	3	6	9
Norway (NOR)	—	3	3
Peru (PER)	—	1	1
Philippines (PHI)	—	1	1
Poland (POL)	2	8	10
Portugal (POR)	—	5	5
Refugee Para Team	—	1	1
RPC (RUS)	17	51	68
Singapore (SGP)	1	4	5
Slovakia (SVK)	—	1	1
Slovenia (SLO)	—	1	1
South Africa (RSA)	—	4	4
South Korea (KOR)	—	5	5
Spain (ESP)	7	24	31
Sweden (SWE)	—	2	2
Switzerland (SUI)	—	2	2
Thailand (THA)	—	2	2
Turkey (TUR)	1	4	5
Ukraine (UKR)	17	40	57
United States (USA)	14	34	48
Uzbekistan (UZB)	3	7	10
Venezuela (VEN)	—	1	1
Vietnam (VIE)	—	4	4
Total	167	591	758

== See also ==
- Swimming at the 2020 Summer Olympics – Qualification
