= Zoltán Tauber =

Hungarian table tennis player

Personal information
- Born: 20 July 1934 Felsőegerszeg, Kingdom of Hungary
- Died: 10 September 2020 (aged 86) Budapest, Hungary

Sport
- Sport: Para table tennis
Medal record
Representing Hungary
Paralympic Games
Gold medal – first place	1976 Toronto	Singles E

Zoltán Tauber (20 July 1934 – 10 September 2020) was a Hungarian para table tennis player who competed at international table tennis competitions. He was the first Hungarian Paralympic champion in 1976.

In 1945, eleven year old Tauber lost both of his hands while dismantling war shells. He learned to play table tennis at the National Home for Disabled Children.

He took part in the 1956 Hungarian Revolution and survived the massacre in Kossuth Square where he was delivering bread on a handcart. In 1976, he won Hungary's first ever Paralympic gold, in the days following his victory, the Hungarian team fled the Paralympic village and returned home duet to Soviet political pressure, Tauber hid his gold medal in his sock, he and his teammate Jószef Oláh's bronze medal in the 100m B weren't recognised. Tauber didn't regain his Paralympic title forty years later where he received his gold medal at a swearing-in ceremony at the 2016 Summer Paralympics in Rio de Janeiro, as well as his gold medal, Tauber received Oláh's bronze medal and awarded the medal to Oláh's widow.
