= Swimming at the 2016 Summer Paralympics – Men's 100 metre backstroke S9 =

Men's 100 metre backstroke S9 at the XV Paralympic Games
- Venue: Olympic Aquatics Stadium
- Dates: 16 September 2016
- Competitors: 14 from 10 nations

Medalists
1st place, gold medalist(s)		Tamás Tóth	Hungary
2nd place, silver medalist(s)		Xiaobing Liu	China
3rd place, bronze medalist(s)		Brenden Hall	Australia

The Men's 100 metre backstroke S9 event at the 2016 Paralympic Games took place on 16 September 2016, at the Olympic Aquatics Stadium. Two heats were held. The swimmers with the eight fastest times advanced to the final.

== Heats ==
=== Heat 1 ===
9:44 16 September 2016:

Rank	Lane	Name	Nationality	Time	Notes
1	4	Patryk Biskup	Poland	1:05.00	Q
2	5	Brenden Hall	Australia	1:05.56	Q
3	3	Timothy Hodge	Australia	1:05.99	Q
4	2	Jesse Reynolds	New Zealand	1:06.34	Q
5	6	Logan Powell	Australia	1:06.37	Q
6	7	Lucas Mozela	Brazil	1:07.84	
7	1	Hyun Kwon	South Korea	1:11.81	

=== Heat 2 ===
9:48 16 September 2016:

Rank	Lane	Name	Nationality	Time	Notes
1	4	James Crisp	Great Britain	1:05.00	Q
2	5	Xiaobing Liu	China	1:05.13	Q
3	3	Tamás Tóth	Hungary	1:05.47	Q
4	2	Andrey Garbe	Brazil	1:07.21	
5	6	Cody Bureau	United States	1:08.16	
6	7	Jendi Pangabean	Indonesia	1:08.28	
7	1	Lewis White	Great Britain	1:09.86	

== Final ==
17:43 16 September 2016:

Rank	Lane	Name	Nationality	Time	Notes
1st place, gold medalist(s)	6	Tamás Tóth	Hungary	1:04.30	
2nd place, silver medalist(s)	3	Xiaobing Liu	China	1:04.46	
3rd place, bronze medalist(s)	2	Brenden Hall	Australia	1:04.67	
4	5	James Crisp	Great Britain	1:05.01	
5	4	Patryk Biskup	Poland	1:05.10	
6	7	Timothy Hodge	Australia	1:05.18	
7	1	Jesse Reynolds	New Zealand	1:05.57	
8	8	Logan Powell	Australia	1:06.13	
