= Hungary at the 1976 Summer Paralympics =

- IPC code: HUN
- NPC: Hungarian Paralympic Committee
- Website: www.hparalimpia.hu

in Toronto
- Competitors: 2
- Medals Ranked 30th: Gold 1 Silver 0 Bronze 1 Total 2

Summer Paralympics appearances (overview)
- 1972; 1976; 1980; 1984; 1988; 1992; 1996; 2000; 2004; 2008; 2012; 2016; 2020; 2024

Hungary competed at the 1976 Summer Paralympics in Toronto. Its athletes finished thirtieth in the overall medal count.

== See also ==
- Hungary at the Paralympics
- Hungary at the 1976 Summer Olympics
