= Hungary at the 1988 Summer Paralympics =

- IPC code: HUN
- NPC: Hungarian Paralympic Committee
- Website: www.hparalimpia.hu

in Seoul
- Competitors: 34
- Medals Ranked 40th: Gold 0 Silver 5 Bronze 7 Total 12

Summer Paralympics appearances (overview)
- 1972; 1976; 1980; 1984; 1988; 1992; 1996; 2000; 2004; 2008; 2012; 2016; 2020; 2024

Hungary competed at the 1988 Summer Paralympics in Seoul, South Korea. 34 competitors from Hungary won 12 medals including 4 silver and 8 bronze and finished 40th in the medal table.

== See also ==
- Hungary at the Paralympics
- Hungary at the 1988 Summer Olympics
