= Hungary at the 1992 Summer Paralympics =

- IPC code: HUN
- NPC: Hungarian Paralympic Committee
- Website: www.hparalimpia.hu

in Barcelona and Madrid
- Competitors: 43
- Medals Ranked 29th: Gold 4 Silver 3 Bronze 4 Total 11

Summer Paralympics appearances (overview)
- 1972; 1976; 1980; 1984; 1988; 1992; 1996; 2000; 2004; 2008; 2012; 2016; 2020; 2024

Hungary competed at the 1992 Summer Paralympics in Barcelona, Spain. 43 competitors from Hungary won 11 medals, including 4 gold, 3 silver and 4 bronze and finished 25th in the medal table.

== See also ==
- Hungary at the Paralympics
- Hungary at the 1992 Summer Olympics
