= Lorena Pierce =

American Paralympic judoka (born 1984)

Personal information
- Born: 6 October 1984 (age 41) Austin, Texas, United States

Sport
- Country: United States
- Sport: Paralympic judo
- Retired: 2010
Medal record
Paralympic judo
Representing United States
Paralympic Games
Silver medal – second place	2004 Athens	Women's -70kg
World Championships
Silver medal – second place	2006 Brommat	Women's -70kg
Parapan American Games
Silver medal – second place	2007 Rio de Janeiro	Women's -70kg

Lorena "Lori" Pierce (born October 6, 1984) is a retired American Paralympic judoka who competed at international level events. She was a silver medalist at the 2004 Summer Paralympics, a World silver medalist and a Parapan American Games silver medalist.
