= Nataliia Morkvych =

Ukrainian wheelchair fencer

Personal information
- Born: 15 January 1992 (age 34) Lviv, Ukraine

Sport
- Country: Ukraine
- Sport: Wheelchair fencing
Medal record
Paralympic Games
Silver medal – second place	2020 Tokyo	Foil A
Silver medal – second place	2024 Paris	Team épée

Nataliia Morkvych (born 15 January 1992) is a Ukrainian wheelchair fencer. She won the silver medal in the women's foil A event at the 2020 Summer Paralympics held in Tokyo, Japan. She also won the silver medal in the women's team épée event at the 2024 Summer Paralympics held in Paris, France.
