= Tatiana Savostyanova =

Russian Paralympic judoka

Personal information
- Born: 23 December 1972 (age 53)
- Occupation: Judoka

Sport
- Country: Russia
- Sport: Paralympic judo
- Disability: Vision impairment
Medal record
Paralympic Games
Bronze medal – third place	2004 Athens	70 kg
Bronze medal – third place	2008 Beijing	70 kg
Silver medal – second place	2012 London	70 kg

Tatiana Savostyanova is a visually impaired Russian Paralympic judoka. She represented Russia at the Summer Paralympics in 2004, 2008 and 2012 and she won one silver medal and two bronze medals at the Summer Paralympics.

At the 2015 IBSA European Judo Championships held in Odivelas, Portugal, she won the gold medal in the women's 70 kg event.
