= Arina Kachan =

Belarusian judoka (born 1994)

Personal information
- National team: Belarus
- Born: March 5, 1994 (age 32)
- Occupation: Judoka

Sport
- Country: Belarus
- Sport: Judo
- Disability: Visual impairment
- Weight class: +70 kg

Achievements and titles
- Paralympic Games: 5th: 2012, 2016
- Highest world ranking: 1
Medal record
Women's para judo
Representing Belarus
IBSA World Games
Silver medal – second place	2015 Seoul	+70 kg
Bronze medal – third place	2011 Antalya	-70 kg
IBSA World Judo Championships
Bronze medal – third place	2014 Colorado	+70 kg
IBSA European Judo Championships
Silver medal – second place	2015 Odivelas	+70 kg
Bronze medal – third place	2011 Crawley	-70 kg

Profile at external databases
- JudoInside.com: 74505

Arina Kachan (born 5 March 1994) is a Belarusian judoka, who has been ranked number one in the world in the women's + 70 kg weight class. She has won multiple medals for her country at the IBSA World Games, IBSA European Judo Championships and the IBSA World Judo Championships.

== Career ==
Arina Kachan was born on 5 March 1994, and competes for Belarus in judo. Initially in the under 70 kg weight class, she won a bronze medal at the International Blind Sports Federation World Games in Antalya, Turkey in 2011 and at the IBSA European Judo Championships in Crawley, England, also in that year. She was called up to the Belarus team for the 2012 Summer Paralympics in London, England, where she finished fifth after losing in a bronze medal match.

In 2014, Arina Kachan won a bronze medal in the women's + 70 kg weight class at the IBSA Judo World Championships held in Colorado, United States. At the 2015 IBSA World Games in Seoul, South Korea, Kachan was defeated by Russian judoka Irina Kalyanova in the final, only winning the silver medal. Later in the year, she took silver again at the IBSA European Judo Championships after being defeated by the world number four, Turkey's Mesem Tasbag.

Going into the 2016 Summer Paralympics in Rio de Janeiro, Brazil, Kachan was ranked first in her weight class, although was not considered to be the favourite – instead reigning Paralympic champion Yanping Yuan was expected to win. Kachan was defeated on the way to the final, having been seeded for the tournament, and fought Tasbag in a bronze medal match instead, where she was defeated and placed outside of the medals once again. When the world rankings were released by the International Blind Sports Federation in January 2017, Kachan continued to be ranked first in the women's + 70 kg weight class.
