= Romain Noble =

French wheelchair fencer (1980–2026)

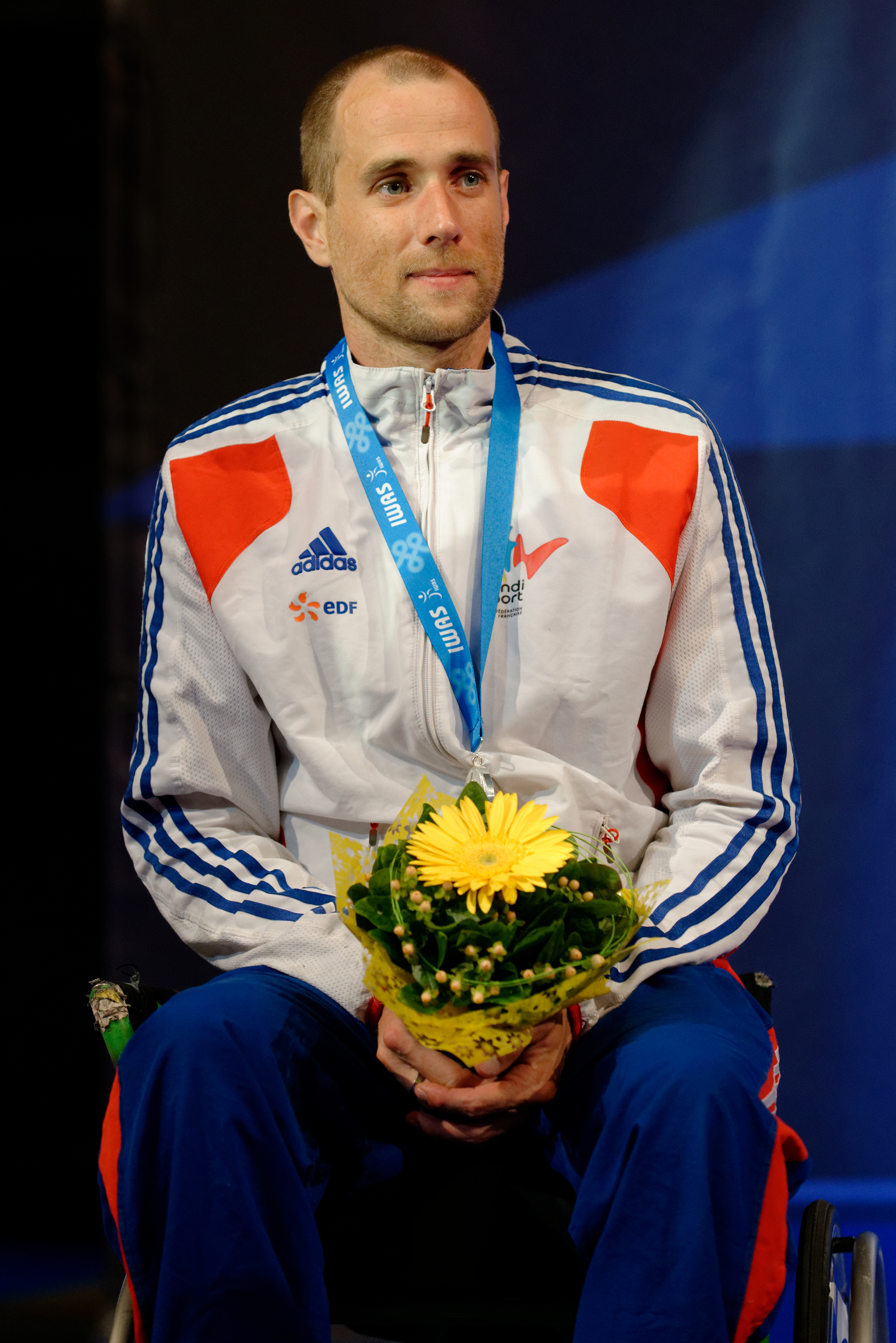
- Noble in 2013

Personal information
- Born: 24 June 1980 Bordeaux, France
- Died: 9 August 2026 (aged 46)

Sport
- Country: France
- Sport: Wheelchair fencing
- Disability: Spina bifida
Medal record
Wheelchair fencing
Representing France
Paralympic Games
Gold medal – first place	2016 Rio de Janeiro	Team épée
Silver medal – second place	2012 London	Individual épée A
Bronze medal – third place	2020 Tokyo	Team foil
World IWAS Championships
Gold medal – first place	2010 Paris	Team sabre
Gold medal – first place	2010 Paris	Team épée
Gold medal – first place	2011 Sheffield	Team sabre
Gold medal – first place	2015 Eger	Team épée
Silver medal – second place	2011 Sheffield	Team épée
Silver medal – second place	2011 Sheffield	Individual épée A
Silver medal – second place	2013 Budapest	Individual épée A
Silver medal – second place	2017 Roma	Team épée
Silver medal – second place	2019 Cheongju	Team épée
Bronze medal – third place	2010 Paris	Individual sabre A
Bronze medal – third place	2013 Budapest	Team sabre
European IWAS Championships
Gold medal – first place	2009 Warsaw	Team épée
Gold medal – first place	2009 Warsaw	Team sabre
Gold medal – first place	2014 Strasbourg	Team épée
Silver medal – second place	2009 Warsaw	Individual sabre A
Silver medal – second place	2014 Strasbourg	Team sabre
Silver medal – second place	2014 Strasbourg	Individual épée A
Silver medal – second place	2016 Casale Monferrato	Individual sabre A
Silver medal – second place	2018 Terni	Team épée

Romain Noble (24 June 1980 – 9 August 2026) was a French wheelchair fencer who competed in international fencing competitions. He was a Paralympic champion, four-time World champion and three-time European champion.

Noble died on 9 August 2026, at the age of 46.

== Honors and awards ==
- Knight of the Order of Legion of Honour(2016)
- Knight of the Ordre National du Mérite (2012)
