= Nándor Tunkel =

Hungarian Paralympic powerlifter

Sport
- Country: Hungary
- Sport: Paralympic powerlifting
Medal record
Paralympic Games
Bronze medal – third place	2016 Rio de Janeiro	49 kg

Nándor Tunkel is a Hungarian Paralympic powerlifter. He represented Hungary at the 2016 Summer Paralympics held in Rio de Janeiro, where he won the bronze medal in the men's 49 kg event.

contevacy

Nandor Tunkel, was involved in child sex allegations, witch he admitted, but no charges was filed.
