= Nikolett Szabó (judoka) =

Hungarian blind judoka

Personal information
- Born: 11 May 1979 (age 47) Budapest, Hungary

Sport
- Country: Hungary
- Sport: Paralympic judo
- Disability: Blindness
Medal record
Paralympic judo
Representing Hungary
Paralympic Games
Bronze medal – third place	2004 Athens	Women's -70kg
Paralympic Games
Bronze medal – third place	2012 London	Women's -70kg
World Championships
Gold medal – first place	2006 Brommat	Women's -70kg
Gold medal – first place	2014 Colorado	Women's -70kg
Bronze medal – third place	2015 Seoul	Women's -70kg
European Championships
Gold medal – first place	2005 Vlaardingen	Women's +70kg
Gold medal – first place	2009 Debrecen	Women's -70kg
Bronze medal – third place	2011 Crawley	Women's -70kg
Bronze medal – third place	2013 Eger	Women's -70kg

Nikolett Szabó (married name: Mrs. Sándor Nagy; born 11 May 1979, Vác) is a retired Hungarian Paralympic judoka. She was Hungary's first female Paralympic judoka to win a medal. She is a World and European Champion in the heavyweight category.
