= Mónika Járomi =

Hungarian Paralympic swimmer

Personal information
- Born: 6 January 1973 (age 53)
- Home town: Debrecen, Hungary
- Height: 1.60 m (5 ft 3 in)

Sport
- Country: Hungary
- Sport: Para swimming
- Disability: Cerebral hypoxia
- Disability class: S5, SB5
Medal record
Women's para swimming
Representing Hungary
Paralympic Games
Gold medal – first place	1996 Atlanta	4x50m medley S1-6
Silver medal – second place	1996 Atlanta	50m butterfly S5
World Championships
Gold medal – first place	1994 Malta	4x50m medley S1-6
Gold medal – first place	1994 Malta	50m butterfly S5

Mónika Járomi (born 6 January 1973) is a retired Hungarian Paralympic swimmer. At the 1996 Summer Paralympics in Atlanta, she won two medals, including one gold. In addition, she is also a two-time World Champion.
