= Ilona Sasváriné Paulik =

Hungarian para table tennis player

Personal information
- Born: 8 November 1954 Budapest, Hungary
- Died: 15 March 1999 (aged 44) Kondoros, Hungary

Sport
- Sport: Para table tennis
Medal record
Representing Hungary
Paralympic Games
Gold medal – first place	1996 Atlanta	Singles C3
Silver medal – second place	1992 Barcelona	Teams C3
Bronze medal – third place	1992 Barcelona	Singles C3
World Championships
Silver medal – second place	1990 Assen	Teams C3
European Championships
Gold medal – first place	1991 Salou	Singles C3
Gold medal – first place	1991 Salou	Teams C3
Gold medal – first place	1997 Stockholm	Singles C3
Silver medal – second place	1997 Stockholm	Open singles wheelchair

Ilona Sasváriné Paulik (8 November 1954 - 15 March 1999) was a Hungarian para table tennis player who competed at international table tennis competitions. She was a Paralympic champion and multiple European champion.

In 2006, Sasváriné Paulik was issued in a Magyar Posta stamp posthumously and a sports hall in Kondoros is named after her.
