= András Fejes (athlete) =

Hungarian paralympic athlete and table tennis player

Personal information
- Born: 12 March 1946 Gyöngyös, Hungary
- Died: 15 April 2020 (aged 74)
- Education: Eötvös Loránd University
- Spouse: Éva Kriszten (m. 1976)

Sport
- Country: Hungary
- Sport: Para-athletics; Table tennis
Medal record
Representing Hungary
Para-athletics
Paralympic Games
Bronze medal – third place	1972 Heidelberg	Men's 60 metres wheelchair 1A
Table tennis
European Championships
Bronze medal – third place	1971 Vienna	Singles
Gold medal – first place	1971 Vienna	Doubles

András Fejes (12 March 1946 – 15 April 2020) was a Hungarian paralympic athlete and table tennis player. He competed at the 1972 Summer Paralympics.

== Life and career ==
Fejes was born in Gyöngyös. He was a clinical psychologist.

Fejes competed at the 1971 European Para Table Tennis Championships, winning the gold and bronze medal in two events. He also competed at the 1972 Summer Paralympics, winning the bronze medal in the men's 60 metres wheelchair 1A event.

Fejes died on 15 April 2020, at the age of 74.
