= Katalin Engelhardt =

Hungarian Paralympic swimmer and powerlifter

Personal information
- Nickname: Kata
- Born: 17 March 1971 (age 55) Mezőhegyes, Hungary

Sport
- Country: Hungary
- Sport: Paralympic swimming Paralympic powerlifting
- Disability class: S5
Medal record
Paralympic swimming
Representing Hungary
Paralympic Games
Gold medal – first place	1996 Atlanta	Women's 4x50m medley S1-6
Silver medal – second place	1992 Barcelona	Women's 50m butterfly S6
Bronze medal – third place	1996 Atlanta	Women's 50m butterfly S5
Bronze medal – third place	1996 Atlanta	Women's 200m individual medley SM5
Bronze medal – third place	2000 Sydney	Women's 50m butterfly S5
Bronze medal – third place	2004 Athens	Women's 50m butterfly S5
World Championships
Silver medal – second place	1994 Malta	Women's 200m individual medley SM5
Silver medal – second place	1998 Christchurch	Women's 50m butterfly S5
Silver medal – second place	1998 Christchurch	Women's 200m individual medley SM5
Silver medal – second place	2006 Durban	Women's 200m individual medley SM5
Bronze medal – third place	1994 Malta	Women's 100m breaststroke SB4
Bronze medal – third place	2002 Mar del Plata	Women's 50m butterfly S5
Bronze medal – third place	2002 Mar del Plata	Women's 200m individual medley SM5
Paralympic powerlifting
European Para Powerlifting Championships
Bronze medal – third place	2018 Berck-Sur-Mer	Women's 43kg

Katalin Engelhardt (born 17 March 1971) is a former Hungarian Paralympic swimmer and Paralympic powerlifter. She has participated at seven Paralympic Games in swimming and has won six medals, including one gold at the 1996 Summer Paralympics in Atlanta. Engelhardt was born with a leg impairment which didn't form properly in her mother's womb.
