= Alexa Szvitacs =

Hungarian para table tennis player

Personal information
- Born: 1 August 1990 (age 35)

Sport
- Country: Hungary
- Sport: Para table tennis
- Disability: Tarsal tunnel syndrome
- Disability class: C9
Medal record
Representing Hungary
Women's para table tennis
Paralympic Games
Bronze medal – third place	2020 Tokyo	Individual C9
Bronze medal – third place	2024 Paris	Singles C9
European Championships
Gold medal – first place	2019 Helsingborg	Singles C9
Women's table tennis
World Junior Championships
Bronze medal – third place	2006 Cairo	Team

Alexa Szvitacs (born 1 August 1990) is a Hungarian para table tennis player and former World Junior bronze medalist.

== Illness ==
In August 2018, Szvitacs suddenly fell ill at home with a high fever and nausea. Her brother phoned for an ambulance and took her to hospital in Debrecen for life saving surgery. She developed toxic shock syndrome which resulted in the amputation of her left forearm and all of her toes and was diagnosed with tarsal tunnel syndrome, she was in rehabilitation for months afterwards.
