= Gitta Ráczkó =

Hungarian Paralympic swimmer

Personal information
- Born: 7 December 1975 (age 50) Veszprém, Hungary
- Height: 1.68 m (5 ft 6 in)
- Weight: 61 kg (134 lb)

Sport
- Country: Hungary
- Sport: Paralympic swimming
- Disability: Cerebral palsy
- Disability class: S7, SB5, SM7
- Club: Ferencvárosi Torna Club
- Coached by: László Formaggini; Csaba Sós
Medal record
Paralympic swimming
Representing Hungary
Paralympic Games
Gold medal – first place	1996 Atlanta	Women's 4x50m medley relay S1-6
Bronze medal – third place	1996 Atlanta	Women's 100m breaststroke SB5
Bronze medal – third place	2004 Athens	Women's 100m breaststroke SB5
Bronze medal – third place	2008 Beijing	Women's 100m breaststroke SB5
World Championships
Silver medal – second place	1998 Christchurch	Women's 100m breaststroke SB5
Bronze medal – third place	2006 Durban	Women's 100m breaststroke SB5

Gitta Ráczkó (born 7 December 1975) is a Hungarian Paralympic swimmer who specialises in the breaststroke.
