= Fanni Illés =

Hungarian Paralympic swimmer

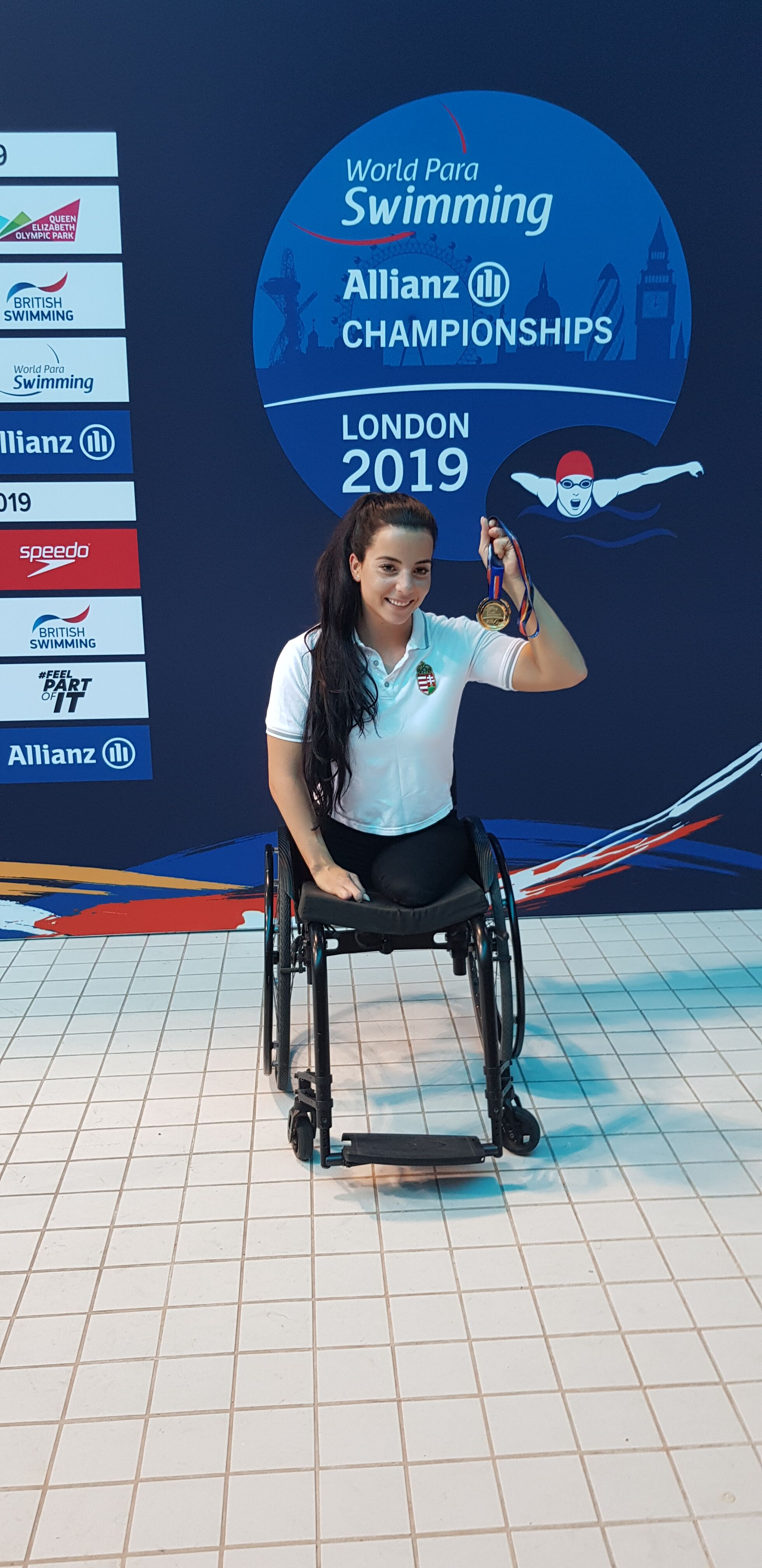
- Illés in 2019

Personal information
- Born: 1 May 1992 (age 34) Keszthely, Hungary
- Home town: Budapest, Hungary

Sport
- Country: Hungary
- Sport: Paralympic swimming
- Disability: Dysmelia, scoliosis
- Disability class: S6, SB4, SM6
- Club: Vasas SC
- Coached by: Álmos Szabó
Medal record
Women's paralympic swimming
Representing Hungary
Paralympic Games
Gold medal – first place	2020 Tokyo	100 m breaststroke SB4
Silver medal – second place	2024 Paris	100 m breaststroke SB4
World Championships
Gold medal – first place	2019 London	100m breaststroke SB4
Bronze medal – third place	2017 Mexico City	100m breaststroke SB4
European Championships
Gold medal – first place	2018 Dublin	100m breaststroke SB4
Bronze medal – third place	2026 Kocaeli	100 m breaststroke SB4

Fanni Illés (born 1 May 1992) is a Hungarian Paralympic swimmer. She was born without legs and has webbed hands. She has been a part of the Hungarian national swimming team since 2006, aged 14, and has participated at three Summer Paralympic Games. She competed at the 2020 Summer Paralympics, winning a gold medal.

== Career ==
Illés was advised by doctors to do swimming after her diagnosis of scoliosis aged 12. She started swimming training lessons in the nearby town of Hévíz. She was nominated for Hungarian Disabled Sportswoman of the Year in 2019. She competed at the 2019 World Para Swimming Championships, winning a gold medal.
