= Boglárka Mező =

Hungarian wheelchair fencer (born 1987)

Personal information
- Full name: Boglárka Mező Madarászné
- Born: 24 September 1987 (age 38)

Fencing career
- Sport: Fencing
- Weapon: Épée B / Foil B / Sabre B
- Disability class: B
Medal record
Wheelchair fencing
Representing Hungary
Summer Paralympics
Silver medal – second place	2024 Paris	Foil team
World Championships
Gold medal – first place	2019 Cheongju	Foil team
Bronze medal – third place	2023 Terni	Epée team
Bronze medal – third place	2023 Terni	Foil team

Boglárka Mező (born 24 September 1987) is a Hungarian wheelchair fencer who competes in épée, foil and sabre B. She has appeared in two Summer Paralympics, 2020 in Tokyo and 2024 in Paris, winning a medal in the latter.

== Career ==
At the 2020 Summer Paralympics, Mező competed in the four events although she did not win a medal in any of them. In January 2022 the wheelchair fencing team of Gyöngyi Dani, Zsuzsanna Krajnyák, Dr. Boglárka Mező Madarászné and Éva Hajmási were Hungary's "best disabled team of the year". She competed at the 2024 Summer Paralympics, where she won a silver medal in the women's foil team event.
