= Amarilla Veres =

Hungarian wheelchair fencer

Personal information
- Born: 1 July 1993 (age 32)

Sport
- Country: Hungary
- Sport: Wheelchair fencing
Medal record
Paralympic Games
| Gold medal – first place | 2020 Tokyo | Épée A |
| Bronze medal – third place | 2016 Rio de Janeiro | Team épée |

Amarilla Veres (born 1 July 1993) is a Hungarian wheelchair fencer. She won the gold medal in the women's épée A event at the 2020 Summer Paralympics held in Tokyo, Japan. She also won the bronze medal in the women's team épée event at the 2016 Summer Paralympics held in Rio de Janeiro, Brazil.
