= Éva Hajmási =

Hungarian wheelchair fencer

Personal information
- Full name: Éva Andrea Hajmási
- Born: 14 February 1987 (age 39)

Sport
- Country: Hungary
- Sport: Wheelchair fencing
Medal record
Paralympic Games
Silver medal – second place	2016 Rio de Janeiro	Team
Silver medal – second place	2024 Paris	Team foil
Bronze medal – third place	2020 Tokyo	Team

Éva Andrea Hajmási (born 14 February 1987) is a Hungarian wheelchair fencer. She represented Hungary at the 2016 Summer Paralympics held in Rio de Janeiro, Brazil and she won the silver medal in the women's team foil event. She also won the bronze medal in this event at the 2020 Summer Paralympics held in Tokyo, Japan.

At the 2020 Summer Paralympics, she competed in the women's individual foil A event where she lost her bronze medal match against Rong Jing of China.

In January 2022 the wheelchair fencing team of Gyöngyi Dani, Zsuzsanna Krajnyák, Boglárka Mező and Hajmási were Hungary's "best disabled team of the year".
