= Richárd Osváth =

Hungarian Paralympic fencer

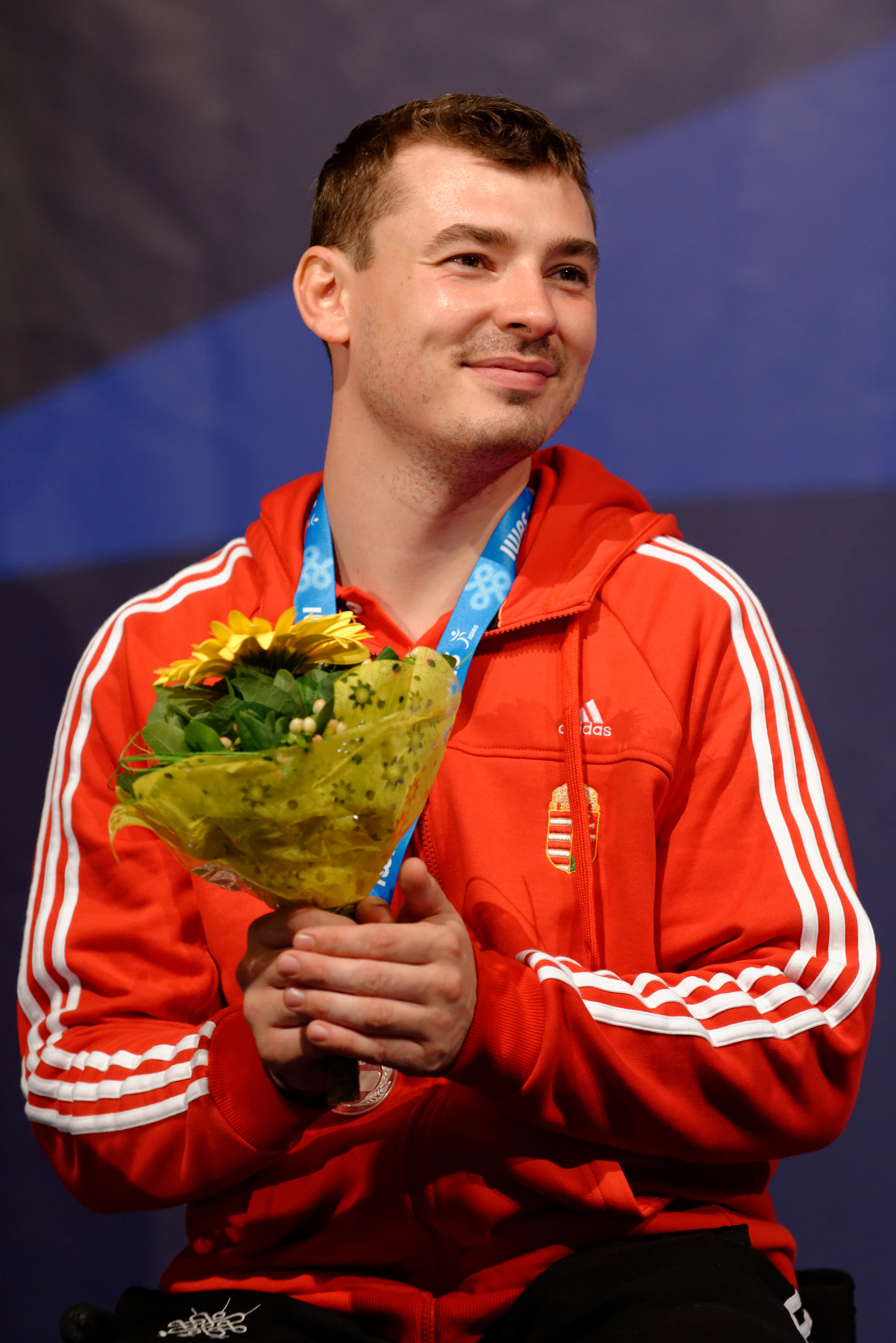
- Osváth at the 2013 Wheelchair Fencing Championships

Personal information
- Nickname: Richie
- Nationality: Romanian, Hungarian
- Born: 28 February 1985 (age 41) Satu Mare, Romania

Fencing career
- Sport: Fencing
- Country: Hungary
- Weapon: Foil A / Sabre A
- Hand: right-handed
- Club: Törekvés SE
- Head coach: Sándor Beliczay (foil); Péter Erdei (saber)
- Disability class: A
- FIE ranking: FIE ranking (archive)
Medal record
Summer Paralympics
Silver medal – second place	2016 Rio de Janeiro	Sabre A
Silver medal – second place	2016 Rio de Janeiro	Foil A
Silver medal – second place	2020 Tokyo	Foil A
Bronze medal – third place	2012 London	Foil A
World Championships
Silver medal – second place	2013 Budapest	Foil A
European Championships
Gold medal – first place	2014 Strasburg	Foil A
Silver medal – second place	2014 Strasburg	Sabre A

Richárd Osváth (born 28 February 1985) is a Hungarian wheelchair fencer from Romania. He won a bronze medal at the 2012 Summer Paralympics in London and a silver medal at the 2013 Wheelchair Fencing World Championships, both in Foil A. He also won a silver medal at the 2014 Wheelchair European Fencing Championships in Sabre A and a gold medal in Foil A.

== Biography ==
Osváth was born in Satu Mare, Romania. He took up fencing at CSS Satu Mare after a sports recruitment event at this school. His first coaches were Éva Lengyel and Attila File, who specialized in foil. He began fencing in international competitions in 2002 and achieved his best ranking, #105 in juniors, in 2004. He won the Romanian national championship six times between 1998 and 2006.

In 2008, Osváth was injured during a football match between friends and had to undergo seven operations in a row. Despite surgery, Osváth was left with a paralysed leg. He stopped sport for four years, then took up wheelchair fencing. Romania having no wheelchair fencing team, Osváth accepted Hungary's offer for support. He took part in the 2012 Summer Paralympics in London and reached the semi-finals, where he was defeated 13–15 by China's Yijun Chen after receiving a red card (penalty hit). In the match for the third place, Osváth won 15–7 against Damien Tokatlian of France. He dedicated his bronze medal both to Hungary and Romania, but mentioned he had received no congratulations from the Romanian Fencing Federation.

In 2013, Osváth took part in both the Foil A and Sabre A events of the IWAS Wheelchair Fencing World Championships in Budapest. In sabre, he was eliminated in the table of 16 by France's Romain Noble. Two days later, in foil, he defeated again top seed Damien Tokatlian and reaped revenge on the Paralympic Games by prevailing 15–8 over Yijun Chen. He reached the final where he was overcome 7–15 by China's Ye Ruyi and won the silver medal.

In 2014, Osváth took a silver medal in the Sabre A event of the European Fencing Championships in Strasburg after being defeated 8–15 by Romain Noble. The day after he won the gold in Foil A after a right 15–14 victory over Poland's Dariusz Pender.
