= András Csonka (table tennis) =

Hungarian para table tennis player

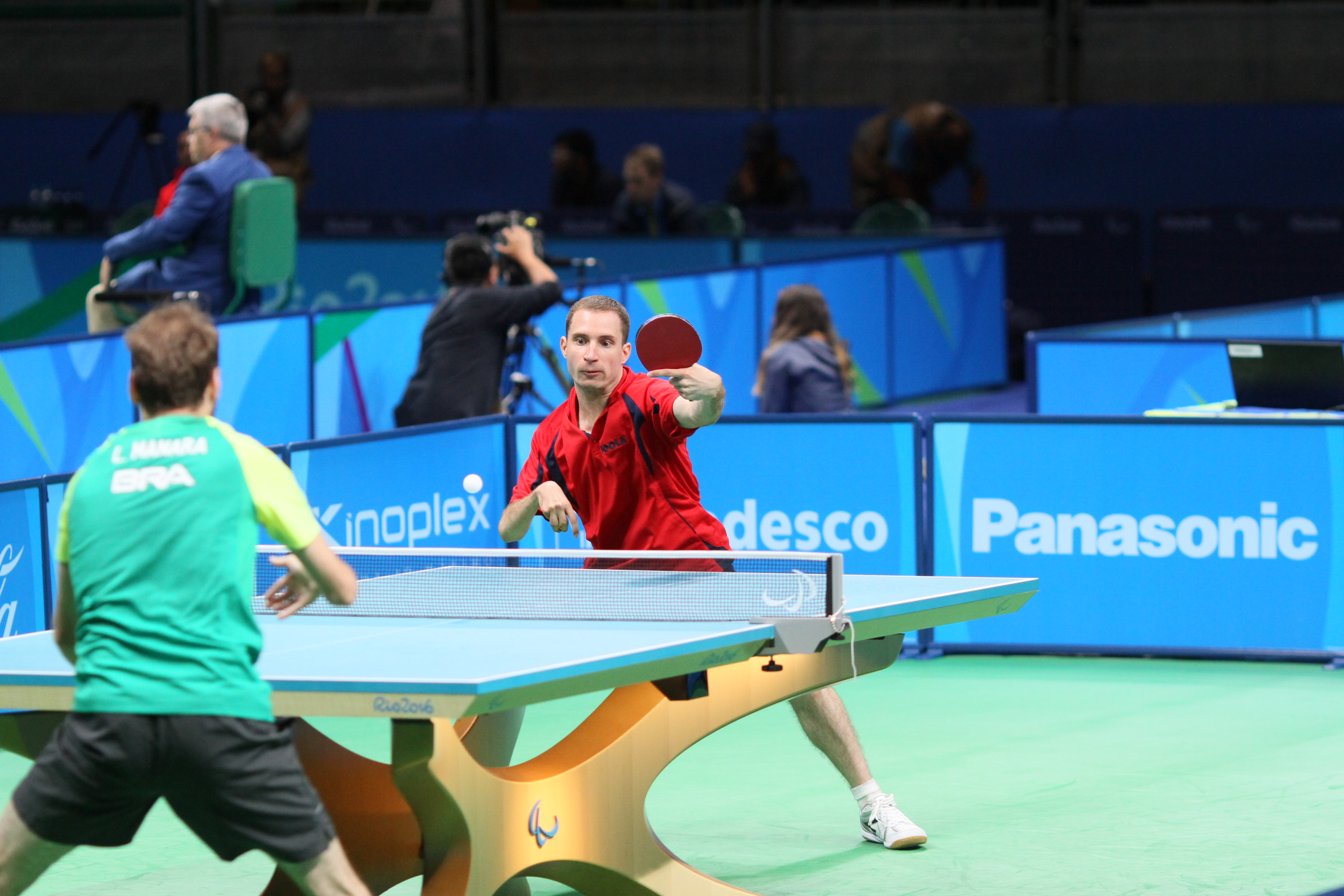

Personal information
- Nickname: Bandi
- Nationality: Hungarian
- Born: 27 November 1988 (age 37) Salgótarján, Hungary
- Home town: Budapest, Hungary
- Height: 1.64 m (5 ft 5 in)
- Weight: 58 kg (128 lb)

Sport
- Country: Hungary
- Sport: Para table tennis
- Disability: Cerebral palsy
- Disability class: C8
- Club: Univer-Sport KFT
- Coached by: Péter Aranyosi (2000 - )
Medal record
Para table tennis
Representing Hungary
Paralympic Games
Silver medal – second place	2016 Rio de Janeiro	Men's singles C8
World Championships
Bronze medal – third place	2010 Gwangju	Men's teams C9
Bronze medal – third place	2014 Beijing	Men's teams C8
European Championships
Silver medal – second place	2007 Kranjska Gora	Men's singles C8
Silver medal – second place	2013 Lignano	Men's teams C8
Bronze medal – third place	2009 Genoa	Men's teams C9
Bronze medal – third place	2015 Vejle	Men's singles C8

András Csonka (born 27 November 1988) is a Hungarian para table tennis player. He started playing table tennis aged nine when his brother played the sport as a hobby.
