= Krisztina Dávid =

Hungarian Paralympic shooter

Personal information
- Nickname: Kriszta
- Born: 5 December 1975 (age 50) Szeged, Hungary
- Education: University of Szeged
- Occupation(s): Paralympic shooter, computer scientist
- Years active: 2010–present

Sport
- Country: Hungary
- Sport: Paralympic shooting
- Disability: Spinal cord injury
- Disability class: SH1
- Event: Women's 10m Air Pistol
- Club: Budapesti Honvéd SE
- Coached by: Andrea Zakor
Medal record
Women's Shooting Para Sport
Representing Hungary
Paralympic Games
Bronze medal – third place	2020 Tokyo	10 m Air Pistol SH1
World Championships
Silver medal – second place	2014 Suhl	10 m Air Pistol SH1

Krisztina Dávid (born 5 December 1975) is a Hungarian Paralympic shooter. She won a bronze medal at the 2020 Summer Paralympics in Tokyo.
