= Zsuzsanna Krajnyák =

Hungarian wheelchair fencer

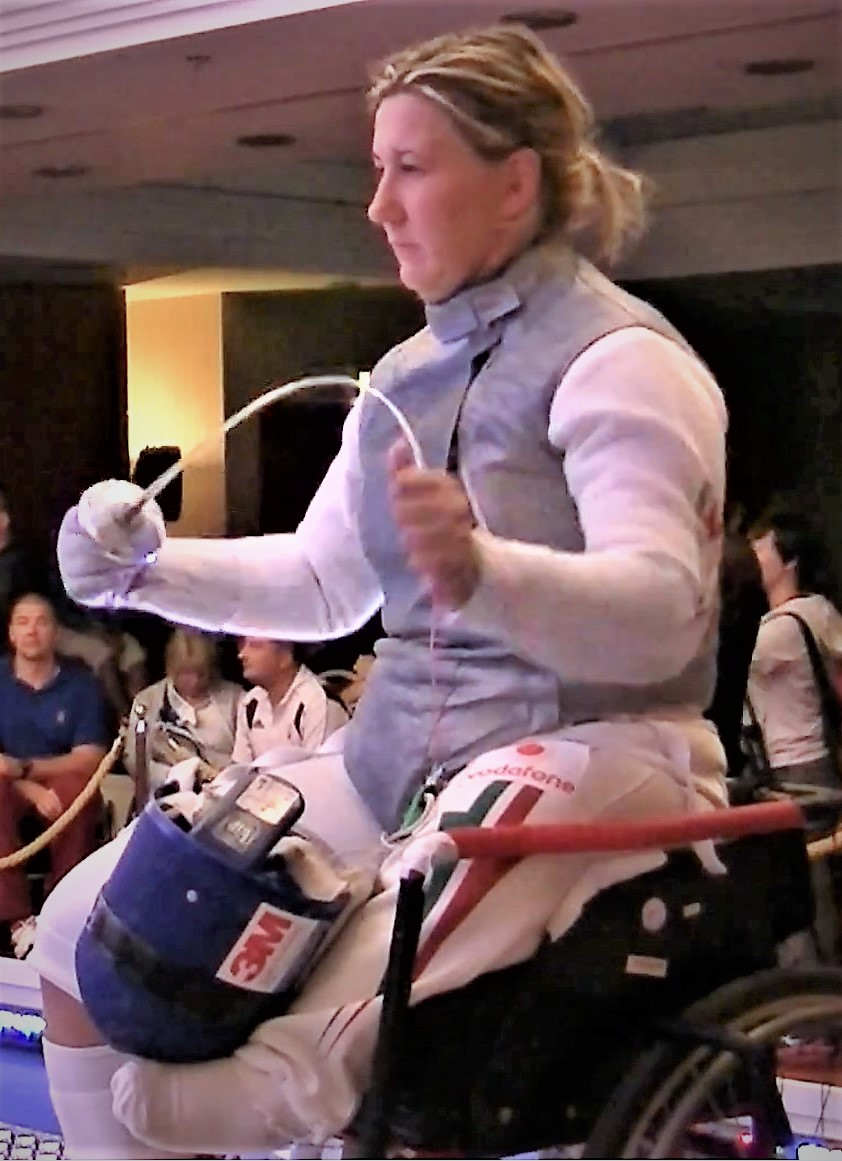
- Krajnyák before a 2013 match

Personal information
- Born: 23 December 1978 (age 47)

Sport
- Country: Hungary
- Sport: Wheelchair fencing
Medal record
Women's wheelchair fencing
Representing Hungary
Paralympic Games
Silver medal – second place	2004 Athens	épée team open
Silver medal – second place	2004 Athens	foil team open
Silver medal – second place	2012 London	épée individual A
Silver medal – second place	2012 London	épée team open
Silver medal – second place	2016 Rio	team foil
Silver medal – second place	2024 Paris	team foil
Bronze medal – third place	2000 Sydney	épée individual A
Bronze medal – third place	2000 Sydney	foil individual A
Bronze medal – third place	2004 Athens	épée individual A
Bronze medal – third place	2016 Rio	foil A
Bronze medal – third place	2016 Rio	team épée
Bronze medal – third place	2020 Tokyo	team foil

Zsuzsanna Krajnyák (born 23 December 1978) is a Hungarian Paralympic wheelchair fencer. She has won 11 medals at the Paralympic Games, with the first two coming at the 2000 Summer Paralympics in Sydney, where she won two bronze medals. She has also won medals at European and World Championships. Krajnyák was nominated for the Laureus World Sports Award for Sportsperson of the Year with a Disability in 2006.

== Early life ==
Krajnyák was born on 23 December 1978. With her left leg have a birth defect, Krajnyák became a swimmer when she was six. She then moved on to fencing and wheelchair fencing.

== Career ==
At International Wheelchair and Amputee Sports Federation competitions, Krajnyák competed at the European Championships from 2001 to 2018 as a wheelchair fencer. With her performances at the epee, foil, and team events, Krajnyák won a total of ten medals. Krajnyák also won gold at the 2017 World Championships in the women's épée A event.

As a World Cup competitor in Class A events, she was beaten by Gemma Collis-McCann in the deciding match of the women's epee during the 2018 World Cup in Montreal. She received a silver medal after losing the match 15–13. During the Montreal event, Krajnyák also won gold in women's foil. At the IWAS World Games, Krajnyák received gold at the women's foil event during the 2019 edition.

=== Paralympics ===
Krajnyák first competed in the Paralympics at the 2000 Summer Paralympics where she won a bronze in the foil and épée events. Alongside a bronze in the épée event at the 2004 Summer Paralympics, Krajnyák also won a silver in the women's team foil and épée. After not medalling at the 2008 Summer Paralympics, Krajnyak won silver medals in the individual and team épée events in the 2012 Summer Paralympics.

In 2016, she earned two Paralympic medals. She earned a silver medal in the team foil competition with a bronze in the team épée and individual foil competitions at the 2016 Summer Paralympics. In the postponed 2020 Summer Paralympics in Tokyo she was part of Poland's team with Eva Hajmasi and Gyongyi Dani and they achieved the bronze medal position in the women's team foil. The silver and gold medals were taken by Italy and China respectively.

== Awards and honours ==
In 2006, Krajnyák was nominated for the Laureus World Sports Award for Sportsperson of the Year with a Disability. In 2016, Krajnyák was named the Disabled Sportswoman of the Year by the Hungarian Sports Journalists Association. Krajnyák was also a co-winner of the disabled team of the year award by the Hungarian Sports Journalists’ Association for 2021.

In January 2022 the wheel chair fencing team of Krajnyák, Gyöngyi Dani, Dr. Boglárka Mező Madarászné and Éva Hajmási were Hungary's "best disabled team of the year".
