= 2024 ICF Paracanoe World Championships – Men's VL2 =

Men's VL2 at the 2024 ICF Paracanoe World Championships
- Venue: Olympic Centre of Szeged
- Location: Szeged, Hungary
- Dates: 9–11 May
- Competitors: 22 from 17 nations
- Winning time: 50.59

Medalists
gold medal	Fernando Rufino	Brazil
silver medal	Igor Alex Tofalini	Brazil
bronze medal	Steven Haxton	United States

The men's VL2 competition at the 2024 ICF Paracanoe World Championships in Szeged took place at the Olympic Centre of Szeged.

== Schedule ==
The schedule was as follows:

Date	Time	Round
Thursday 9 May 2024	15:15	Heats
Friday 10 May 2024	8:45	Semifinals
Saturday 11 May 2024	11:16	Final A
Saturday 11 May 2024	11:28	Final B

All times are Central European Summer Time (UTC+2)

== Results ==
=== Heats ===
Heat winners advanced directly to the A final.
The next six fastest boats in each heat advanced to the semifinals.

==== Heat 1 ====
Rank	Name	Country	Time	Notes
1	Fernando Rufino	Brazil	50.41	QA
2	Andrii Kryvchun	Ukraine	53.51	QS
3	Higinio Rivero	Spain	54.92	QS
4	Marius-Bogdan Ciustea	Italy	55.65	QS
5	Anas Al Khalifa	Germany	1:00.02	QS
6	Ilya Taupianets	AIN	1:02.64	QS
7	Surender Kumar	India	1:19.46	QS

==== Heat 2 ====
Rank	Name	Country	Time	Notes
1	Igor Alex Tofalini	Brazil	50.88	QA
2	Norberto Mourão	Portugal	54.03	QS
3	Mathieu St-Pierre	Canada	54.54	QS
4	Miroslav Šperk	Czech Republic	57.73	QS
5	Amit Kumar	India	1:03.28	QS
6	Takanori Kato	Japan	1:03.88	QS
7	Eslam Jahedi	Iran	DNS	aS

==== Heat 3 ====
Rank	Name	Country	Time	Notes
1	Steven Haxton	United States	50.55	QA
2	Róbert Suba	Hungary	53.84	QS
3	Edward Clifton	Great Britain	54.80	QS
4	Tamás Juhász	Hungary	56.99	QS
5	Andrei Tkachuk	AIN	58.33	QS
6	Santi Wantawee	Thailand	58.97	QS
7	Yassin Awad	Egypt	1:29.65	QS
–	Gajendra Singh	India	DNS	

=== Semifinals ===
The fastest three boats in each semi advanced to the A final.
The next four fastest boats in each semi, plus the fastest remaining boat advanced to the B final.

==== Semifinal 1 ====
Rank	Name	Country	Time	Notes
1	Róbert Suba	Hungary	1:00.34	QA
2	Higinio Rivero	Spain	1:01.06	QA
3	Mathieu St-Pierre	Canada	1:01.54	QA
4	Tamás Juhász	Hungary	1:02.59	QB
5	Miroslav Šperk	Czech Republic	1:04.07	QB
6	Anas Al Khalifa	Germany	1:07.55	QB
7	Takanori Kato	Japan	1:10.14	QB
8	Ilya Taupianets	AIN	1:11.63	
9	Yassin Awad	Egypt	1:49.61	

==== Semifinal 2 ====
Rank	Name	Country	Time	Notes
1	Norberto Mourão	Portugal	56.30	QA
2	Andrii Kryvchun	Ukraine	57.79	QA
3	Marius-Bogdan Ciustea	Italy	59.55	QA
4	Edward Clifton	Great Britain	59.56	QB
5	Eslam Jahedi	Iran	1:00.29	QB
6	Andrei Tkachuk	AIN	1:01.66	QB
7	Santi Wantawee	Thailand	1:04.01	QB
8	Amit Kumar	India	1:06.33	qB
9	Surender Kumar	India	1:35.50	

=== Finals ===
==== Final B ====
Competitors raced for positions 10 to 18.

Rank	Name	Country	Time
1	Edward Clifton	Great Britain	53.69
2	Eslam Jahedi	Iran	55.62
3	Andrei Tkachuk	AIN	55.68
4	Tamás Juhász	Hungary	57.08
5	Santi Wantawee	Thailand	58.72
6	Anas Al Khalifa	Germany	59.54
7	Takanori Kato	Japan	1:01.15
8	Amit Kumar	India	1:03.85
–	Miroslav Šperk	Czech Republic	DSQ

==== Final A ====
Competitors raced for positions 1 to 9, with medals going to the top three.

Rank	Name	Country	Time
1st place, gold medalist(s)	Fernando Rufino	Brazil	50.59
2nd place, silver medalist(s)	Igor Alex Tofalini	Brazil	51.20
3rd place, bronze medalist(s)	Steven Haxton	United States	52.25
4	Norberto Mourão	Portugal	52.89
5	Higinio Rivero	Spain	54.12
6	Róbert Suba	Hungary	54.66
7	Mathieu St-Pierre	Canada	54.80
8	Andrii Kryvchun	Ukraine	54.94
9	Marius-Bogdan Ciustea	Italy	55.65
