= 2023 ICF Canoe Sprint World Championships – Men's VL2 =

Men's VL2 at the 2023 ICF Canoe Sprint World Championships
- Venue: Sportpark Duisburg
- Location: Duisburg, Germany
- Dates: 23–26 August
- Competitors: 19 from 16 nations
- Winning time: 50.344

Medalists
gold medal	Fernando Rufino	Brazil
silver medal	Igor Alex Tofalini	Brazil
bronze medal	Steven Haxton	United States

The men's VL2 competition at the 2023 ICF Canoe Sprint World Championships in Duisburg took place at Sportpark Duisburg.

== Schedule ==
The schedule was as follows:

Date	Time	Round
Wednesday 23 August 2023	15:40	Heats
Thursday 24 August 2023	15:20	Semifinals
Saturday 26 August 2023	8:50	Final B
Saturday 26 August 2023	11:41	Final A

All times are Central European Summer Time (UTC+2)

== Results ==
=== Heats ===
Heat winners advanced directly to the A final.
The next six fastest boats in each heat advanced to the semifinals.

==== Heat 1 ====
Rank	Name	Country	Time	Notes
1	Igor Alex Tofalini	Brazil	51.727	QA
2	Higinio Rivero	Spain	54.236	QS
3	Mathieu St-Pierre	Canada	54.264	QS
4	Tamás Juhász	Hungary	56.922	QS
5	Takanori Kato	Japan	1:02.718	QS
6	Santi Wantawee	Thailand	1:04.843	QS
7	Moritz Berthold	Germany	1:17.233	QS

==== Heat 2 ====
Rank	Name	Country	Time	Notes
1	Fernando Rufino	Brazil	52.579	QA
2	Róbert Suba	Hungary	54.386	QS
3	Andrii Kryvchun	Ukraine	56.356	QS
4	Eslam Jahedi	Iran	57.504	QS
5	Anas Al Khalifa	Germany	1:01.032	QS
6	Miroslav Šperk	Czech Republic	1:05.319	QS

==== Heat 3 ====
Rank	Name	Country	Time	Notes
1	Steven Haxton	United States	53.301	QA
2	Norberto Mourão	Portugal	54.173	QS
3	Edward Clifton	Great Britain	55.774	QS
4	Marius-Bogdan Ciustea	Italy	1:00.355	QS
5	Gajendra Singh	India	1:03.621	QS
6	Yuta Takagi	Japan	1:06.652	QS

=== Semifinals ===
The fastest three boats in each semi advanced to the A final.
The next four fastest boats in each semi and fastest eighth-placer advanced to the B final.

==== Semifinal 1 ====
Rank	Name	Country	Time	Notes
1	Higinio Rivero	Spain	53.437	QA
2	Andrii Kryvchun	Ukraine	54.383	QA
3	Edward Clifton	Great Britain	54.701	QA
4	Tamás Juhász	Hungary	55.027	QB
5	Marius-Bogdan Ciustea	Italy	58.732	QB
6	Anas Al Khalifa	Germany	58.959	QB
7	Santi Wantawee	Thailand	1:03.006	QB
8	Yuta Takagi	Japan	1:10.905	qB

==== Semifinal 2 ====
Rank	Name	Country	Time	Notes
1	Róbert Suba	Hungary	52.175	QA
2	Norberto Mourão	Portugal	53.012	QA
3	Mathieu St-Pierre	Canada	54.225	QA
4	Eslam Jahedi	Iran	55.613	QB
5	Miroslav Šperk	Czech Republic	1:00.947	QB
6	Takanori Kato	Japan	1:02.950	QB
7	Gajendra Singh	India	1:04.283	QB
8	Moritz Berthold	Germany	1:16.392	

=== Finals ===
==== Final B ====
Competitors in this final raced for positions 10 to 18.

Rank	Canoeist	Country	Time
1	Tamás Juhász	Hungary	56.864
2	Eslam Jahedi	Iran	57.149
3	Marius-Bogdan Ciustea	Italy	59.092
4	Anas Al Khalifa	Germany	1:00.531
5	Miroslav Šperk	Czech Republic	1:02.590
6	Gajendra Singh	India	1:02.716
7	Santi Wantawee	Thailand	1:02.963
8	Takanori Kato	Japan	1:05.667
9	Yuta Takagi	Japan	1:08.001

==== Final A ====
Competitors raced for positions 1 to 9, with medals going to the top three.

Rank	Canoeist	Country	Time
1st place, gold medalist(s)	Fernando Rufino	Brazil	50.344
2nd place, silver medalist(s)	Igor Alex Tofalini	Brazil	51.229
3rd place, bronze medalist(s)	Steven Haxton	United States	52.089
4	Róbert Suba	Hungary	52.848
5	Norberto Mourão	Portugal	53.143
6	Higinio Rivero	Spain	54.137
7	Andrii Kryvchun	Ukraine	54.246
8	Mathieu St-Pierre	Canada	54.411
9	Edward Clifton	Great Britain	55.382
