= 2025 ICF Canoe Sprint World Championships – Men's VL2 =

Men's VL2 at the 2025 ICF Canoe Sprint World Championships
- Venue: Idroscalo Regatta Course
- Location: Milan, Italy
- Dates: 20–23 August
- Competitors: 18 from 15 nations
- Winning time: 51.80

Medalists
gold medal	Fernando Rufino	Brazil
silver medal	Igor Alex Tofalini	Brazil
bronze medal	Edward Clifton	Great Britain

The men's VL2 200 metres competition at the 2025 ICF Canoe Sprint World Championships in Milan took place in Idroscalo Regatta Course.

== Schedule ==
The schedule is as follows:

Date	Time	Round
Wednesday 20 August 2025	15:48	Heats
Friday 22 August 2025	09:05	Semifinals
Saturday 23 August 2025	13:20	Final B
Saturday 23 August 2025	15:06	Final A

== Results ==
=== Heats ===
The fastest three boats in each heat advanced directly to the final (QF). The next four fastest boats in each heat, plus the fastest remaining boat advanced to the semifinal (QS).

==== Heat 1 ====
Rank	Canoeist	Country	Time	Notes
1	Fernando Rufino	Brazil	52.39	QF
2	Igor Korobeynikov	Individual Neutral Athletes	53.37	QF
3	Guan Nengwei	China	55.96	QF
4	Andrei Tkachuk	Individual Neutral Athletes	56.49	QS
5	Mathieu St-Pierre	Canada	56.57	QS
6	Róbert Suba	Hungary	1:14.98	QS
7	Xander Van der Poll	Great Britain	59.01	QS
8	Takanori Kato	Japan	1:03.74	
9	On Youn-ho	South Korea	1:06.07	

==== Heat 2 ====
Rank	Canoeist	Country	Time	Notes
1	Igor Alex Tofalini	Brazil	52.43	QF
2	Edward Clifton	Great Britain	52.98	QF
3	Roman Serebriakov	Individual Neutral Athletes	53.54	QF
4	Norberto Mourão	Portugal	53.98	QS
5	Andrii Kryvchun	Ukraine	54.92	QS
6	Marius-Bogdan Ciustea	Italy	56.27	QS
7	Miroslav Šperk	Czech Republic	56.82	QS
8	Amit Kumar	India	59.98	qS
	Steven Haxton	United States	DSQ	

=== Semifinal ===
The fastest three boats advanced to the final

Rank	Canoeist	Country	Time	Notes
1	Norberto Mourão	Portugal	54.38	QF
2	Miroslav Šperk	Czech Republic	55.06	QF
3	Xander Van der Poll	Great Britain	55.61	QF
4	Andrii Kryvchun	Ukraine	55.73	
5	Marius-Bogdan Ciustea	Italy	56.71	
6	Andrei Tkachuk	Individual Neutral Athletes	56.93	
7	Mathieu St-Pierre	Canada	57.30	
8	Róbert Suba	Hungary	59.14	
9	Amit Kumar	India	1:01.41	

=== Final ===
Competitors raced for positions 1 to 9, with medals going to the top three.

Rank	Canoeist	Country	Time	Notes
1st place, gold medalist(s)	Fernando Rufino	Brazil	51.80	
2nd place, silver medalist(s)	Igor Alex Tofalini	Brazil	51.84	
3rd place, bronze medalist(s)	Edward Clifton	Great Britain	53.04	
4	Norberto Mourão	Portugal	53.23	
5	Igor Korobeynikov	Individual Neutral Athletes	53.74	
6	Roman Serebriakov	Individual Neutral Athletes	53.92	
7	Xander Van der Poll	Great Britain	55.22	
8	Miroslav Šperk	Czech Republic	55.59	
9	Guan Nengwei	China	57.52	
