= 2024 ICF Paracanoe World Championships – Men's KL1 =

Men's KL1 at the 2024 ICF Paracanoe World Championships
- Venue: Olympic Centre of Szeged
- Location: Szeged, Hungary
- Dates: 10–11 May
- Competitors: 16 from 13 nations
- Winning time: 46.17

Medalists
gold medal	Luis Cardoso da Silva	Brazil
silver medal	Rémy Boullé	France
bronze medal	Saeid Hosseinpour	Iran

The men's KL1 competition at the 2024 ICF Paracanoe World Championships in Szeged took place at the Olympic Centre of Szeged.

== Schedule ==
The schedule was as follows:

Date	Time	Round
Friday 10 May 2024	16:43	Heats
Saturday 11 May 2024	9:05	Semifinal
Saturday 11 May 2024	15:11	Final

All times are Central European Summer Time (UTC+2)

== Results ==
=== Heats ===
The fastest three boats in each heat advanced directly to the final.
The next four fastest boats in each heat, plus the fastest remaining boat advanced to the semifinal.

==== Heat 1 ====
Rank	Name	Country	Time	Notes
1	Luis Cardoso da Silva	Brazil	48.07	QF
2	Saeid Hosseinpour	Iran	49.94	QF
3	Esteban Farias	Italy	51.22	QF
4	Alex Santos	Portugal	52.97	QS
5	Adrián Castaño	Spain	55.21	QS
6	Yuta Takagi	Japan	1:02.47	QS
7	Surender Kumar	India	1:18.18	QS
–	Péter Pál Kiss	Hungary	DNS	

==== Heat 2 ====
Rank	Name	Country	Time	Notes
1	Rémy Boullé	France	47.67	QF
2	Luciano Pereira Lima	Brazil	49.26	QF
3	Róbert Suba	Hungary	49.61	QF
4	Yu Xiaowei	China	52.30	QS
5	Yash Kumar	India	59.61	QS
6	Maxim Bogatyrev	Kazakhstan	59.86	QS
7	Yassin Awad	Egypt	1:02.42	QS
8	Andreas Potamitis	Cyprus	1:11.65	qS

=== Semifinal ===
The fastest three boats advanced to the final.

Rank	Name	Country	Time	Notes
1	Alex Santos	Portugal	51.84	QF
2	Yu Xiaowei	China	51.97	QF
3	Adrián Castaño	Spain	54.17	QF
4	Yash Kumar	India	58.86	
5	Yassin Awad	Egypt	59.67	
6	Yuta Takagi	Japan	1:00.01	
7	Andreas Potamitis	Cyprus	1:07.97	
8	Surender Kumar	India	1:25.09	
–	Maxim Bogatyrev	Kazakhstan	DNS	

=== Final ===
Competitors raced for positions 1 to 9, with medals going to the top three.

Rank	Name	Country	Time
1st place, gold medalist(s)	Luis Cardoso da Silva	Brazil	46.17
2nd place, silver medalist(s)	Rémy Boullé	France	46.63
3rd place, bronze medalist(s)	Saeid Hosseinpour	Iran	48.42
4	Luciano Pereira Lima	Brazil	48.68
5	Róbert Suba	Hungary	49.54
6	Esteban Farias	Italy	50.55
7	Yu Xiaowei	China	50.98
8	Alex Santos	Portugal	52.51
9	Adrián Castaño	Spain	54.29
