= 2016 ICF Paracanoe World Championships – Men's KL1 =

Men's KL1 at the 2016 ICF Paracanoe World Championships
- Location: Duisburg, Germany
- Dates: 17–19 May
- Competitors: 21 from 18 nations
- Winning time: 50.596

Medalists
gold medal	Yu Xiaowei	China
silver medal	Jakub Tokarz	Poland
bronze medal	Luis Cardoso da Silva	Brazil

The men's KL1 competition at the 2016 ICF Paracanoe World Championships took place in Duisburg.

== Schedule ==
The schedule was as follows:

Date	Time	Round
Tuesday 17 May 2016	14:00	Heats
Wednesday 18 May 2016	10:50	Semifinals
Thursday 19 May 2016	10:40	Final B
Thursday 19 May 2016	10:45	Final A

All times are Central European Summer Time (UTC+2)

== Results ==
=== Heats ===
Heat winners advanced directly to the A final. The next six fastest boats in each heat advanced to the semifinals.

==== Heat 1 ====
Rank	Name	Country	Time	Notes
1	Luis Cardoso da Silva	Brazil	53.186	QA
2	Ian Marsden	Great Britain	53.614	QS
3	Lucas Díaz	Argentina	55.904	QS
4	Oleksandr Hrechko	Ukraine	57.317	QS
5	Elmar Sternath	Austria	1:00.014	QS
6	Pavel Gromov	Russia	1:00.464	QS
7	Adrián Castaño	Spain	1:01.278	QS

==== Heat 2 ====
Rank	Name	Country	Time	Notes
1	Yu Xiaowei	China	51.060	QA
2	Jakub Tokarz	Poland	51.209	QS
3	Graham Paull	South Africa	53.580	QS
4	Tamás Juhász	Hungary	57.303	QS
5	Stefan Volkmann	Germany	57.396	QS
6	Paulo Santos	Portugal	1:00.979	QS
7	Andreas Potamitis	Cyprus	1:01.392	QS

==== Heat 3 ====
Rank	Name	Country	Time	Notes
1	Róbert Suba	Hungary	53.247	QA
2	Rémy Boullé	France	55.092	QS
3	Fernando Fernandes de Pádua	Brazil	55.736	QS
4	Colin Sieders	Australia	56.250	QS
5	Salvatore Ravalli	Italy	57.917	QS
6	Andrea Biagi	Italy	1:12.378	QS
–	Azizbek Abdulkhabibov	Uzbekistan	DSQ	

=== Semifinals ===
The fastest three boats in each semi advanced to the A final.
The next four fastest boats in each semi, plus the fastest remaining boat advanced to the B final.

==== Semifinal 1 ====
Rank	Name	Country	Time	Notes
1	Ian Marsden	Great Britain	51.090	QA
2	Graham Paull	South Africa	51.559	QA
3	Fernando Fernandes de Pádua	Brazil	52.282	QA
4	Colin Sieders	Australia	53.409	QB
5	Oleksandr Hrechko	Ukraine	54.364	QB
6	Stefan Volkmann	Germany	55.061	QB
7	Pavel Gromov	Russia	58.250	QB
8	Andreas Potamitis	Cyprus	1:00.081	
–	Andrea Biagi	Italy	SO	

==== Semifinal 2 ====
Rank	Name	Country	Time	Notes
1	Jakub Tokarz	Poland	49.209	QA
2	Rémy Boullé	France	51.304	QA
3	Salvatore Ravalli	Italy	53.241	QA
4	Lucas Díaz	Argentina	53.538	QB
5	Tamás Juhász	Hungary	53.622	QB
6	Elmar Sternath	Austria	57.458	QB
7	Adrián Castaño	Spain	58.409	QB
8	Paulo Santos	Portugal	58.527	qB
–	Azizbek Abdulkhabibov	Uzbekistan	DSQ; ~~47.149~~	

=== Finals ===
==== Final B ====
Competitors in this final raced for positions 10 to 18.

Rank	Name	Country	Time
1	Tamás Juhász	Hungary	53.849
2	Lucas Díaz	Argentina	54.679
3	Oleksandr Hrechko	Ukraine	54.918
4	Colin Sieders	Australia	55.267
5	Stefan Volkmann	Germany	56.546
6	Pavel Gromov	Russia	59.276
7	Adrián Castaño	Spain	59.338
8	Paulo Santos	Portugal	59.543
9	Elmar Sternath	Austria	1:07.124

==== Final A ====
Competitors in this final raced for positions 1 to 9, with medals going to the top three.

Rank	Name	Country	Time
1st place, gold medalist(s)	Yu Xiaowei	China	50.596
2nd place, silver medalist(s)	Jakub Tokarz	Poland	50.855
3rd place, bronze medalist(s)	Luis Cardoso da Silva	Brazil	52.233
4	Ian Marsden	Great Britain	52.312
5	Fernando Fernandes de Pádua	Brazil	53.160
6	Róbert Suba	Hungary	53.186
7	Graham Paull	South Africa	53.668
8	Rémy Boullé	France	54.039
9	Salvatore Ravalli	Italy	55.568
