= 2019 ICF Canoe Sprint World Championships – Men's VL2 =

Men's VL2 at the 2019 ICF Canoe Sprint World Championships
- Venue: Olympic Centre of Szeged
- Location: Szeged, Hungary
- Dates: 21–22 August
- Competitors: 19 from 15 nations
- Winning time: 51.68

Medalists
gold medal	Luis Cardoso da Silva	Brazil
silver medal	Norberto Mourão	Portugal
bronze medal	Jakub Tokarz	Poland

The men's VL2 competition at the 2019 ICF Canoe Sprint World Championships in Szeged took place at the Olympic Centre of Szeged.

== Schedule ==
The schedule was as follows:

Date	Time	Round
Wednesday 21 August 2019	16:25	Heats
Thursday 22 August 2019	11:20	Semifinals
Thursday 22 August 2019	16:20	Final B
Thursday 22 August 2019	16:30	Final A

All times are Central European Summer Time (UTC+2)

== Results ==
=== Heats ===
Heat winners advanced directly to the A final.
The next six fastest boats in each heat advanced to the semifinals.

==== Heat 1 ====
Rank	Name	Country	Time	Notes
1	Norberto Mourão	Portugal	52.40	QA
2	Jakub Tokarz	Poland	52.47	QS
3	Róbert Suba	Hungary	53.35	QS
4	Igor Alex Tofalini	Brazil	54.46	QS
5	Andrei Tkachuk	Belarus	56.85	QS
6	Eslam Jahedi	Iran	58.27	QS
7	Takanori Kato	Japan	1:00.94	QS

==== Heat 2 ====
Rank	Name	Country	Time	Notes
1	Tamás Juhász	Hungary	53.28	QA
2	Roman Serebryakov	Russia	53.33	QS
3	Igor Korobeynikov	Russia	53.42	QS
4	Stewart Clark	Great Britain	54.91	QS
5	Mathieu St-Pierre	Canada	56.36	QS
6	Oleksandr Suprun	Ukraine	58.38	QS

==== Heat 3 ====
Rank	Name	Country	Time	Notes
1	Luis Cardoso da Silva	Brazil	51.95	QA
2	Marius-Bogdan Ciustea	Italy	54.40	QS
3	Higinio Rivero	Spain	54.61	QS
4	Blake Haxton	United States	56.46	QS
5	Ilya Taupianets	Belarus	59.20	QS
6	Gajendra Singh	India	1:06.73	QS

=== Semifinals ===
Qualification was as follows:

The fastest three boats in each semi advanced to the A final.
The next four fastest boats in each semi, plus the fastest remaining boat advanced to the B final.

==== Semifinal 1 ====
Rank	Name	Country	Time	Notes
1	Jakub Tokarz	Poland	52.15	QA
2	Igor Korobeynikov	Russia	53.27	QA
3	Higinio Rivero	Spain	53.60	QA
4	Mathieu St-Pierre	Canada	55.53	QB
5	Igor Alex Tofalini	Brazil	55.60	QB
6	Blake Haxton	United States	55.88	QB
7	Eslam Jahedi	Iran	59.88	QB
8	Gajendra Singh	India	1:07.69	

==== Semifinal 2 ====
Rank	Name	Country	Time	Notes
1	Roman Serebryakov	Russia	53.23	QA
2	Róbert Suba	Hungary	53.80	QA
3	Marius-Bogdan Ciustea	Italy	55.12	QA
4	Andrei Tkachuk	Belarus	55.85	QB
5	Stewart Clark	Great Britain	56.05	QB
6	Ilya Taupianets	Belarus	57.48	QB
7	Oleksandr Suprun	Ukraine	57.50	QB
8	Takanori Kato	Japan	1:02.44	qB

=== Finals ===
==== Final B ====
Competitors in this final raced for positions 10 to 18.

Rank	Name	Country	Time
1	Stewart Clark	Great Britain	55.54
2	Mathieu St-Pierre	Canada	55.94
3	Blake Haxton	United States	56.59
4	Igor Alex Tofalini	Brazil	56.65
5	Oleksandr Suprun	Ukraine	57.58
6	Andrei Tkachuk	Belarus	57.62
7	Eslam Jahedi	Iran	59.82
8	Ilya Taupianets	Belarus	59.84
9	Takanori Kato	Japan	1:02.33

==== Final A ====
Competitors raced for positions 1 to 9, with medals going to the top three.

Rank	Name	Country	Time
1st place, gold medalist(s)	Luis Cardoso da Silva	Brazil	51.68
2nd place, silver medalist(s)	Norberto Mourão	Portugal	52.82
3rd place, bronze medalist(s)	Jakub Tokarz	Poland	53.21
4	Roman Serebryakov	Russia	53.42
5	Tamás Juhász	Hungary	53.87
6	Róbert Suba	Hungary	54.20
7	Higinio Rivero	Spain	54.32
8	Igor Korobeynikov	Russia	54.34
9	Marius-Bogdan Ciustea	Italy	54.93
