= Canoe at the 2016 Summer Paralympics – Men's KL1 =

Men's KL1 at the XV Paralympic Games
- Venue: Lagoa Rodrigo de Freitas
- Dates: 14–15 September 2016
- Competitors: 10 from 10 nations

Medalists
1st place, gold medalist(s)		Jakub Tokarz	Poland
2nd place, silver medalist(s)		Róbert Suba	Hungary
3rd place, bronze medalist(s)		Ian Marsden	Great Britain

The Canoe Sprint men's KL1 event at the 2016 Paralympic Games took place on 14 and 15 September 2016, at the Lagoa Rodrigo de Freitas. Two heats were held. Winners and runners up advanced directly to the final. The rest went into the semifinal, where the top four advanced to the final.

== Heats ==
=== Heat 1 ===
Rank	Lane	Name	Nationality	Time	Notes
1	5	Ian Marsden	Great Britain	52.311	F
2	7	Róbert Suba	Hungary	52.728	F
3	6	Yu Xiaowei	China	54.524	SF
4	4	Lucas Díaz	Argentina	55.585	SF
5	8	Salvatore Ravalli	Italy	01:16.28	SF

=== Heat 2 ===
Rank	Lane	Name	Nationality	Time	Notes
1	5	Luis Cardoso da Silva	Brazil	54.887	F
2	8	Rémy Boullé	France	55.291	F
3	6	Jakub Tokarz	Poland	55.469	SF
4	4	Colin Sieders	Australia	59.732	SF
–	7	Graham Paull	South Africa	DSQ	

== Semifinal ==
Rank	Lane	Name	Nationality	Time	Notes
1	5	Jakub Tokarz	Poland	54.241	F
2	6	Yu Xiaowei	China	54.63	F
3	7	Lucas Díaz	Argentina	55.613	F
4	4	Colin Sieders	Australia	57.176	F
5	8	Salvatore Ravalli	Italy	01:07.65	

== Final ==
Rank	Lane	Name	Nationality	Time	Notes
1st place, gold medalist(s)	2	Jakub Tokarz	Poland	51.084	
2nd place, silver medalist(s)	3	Róbert Suba	Hungary	51.129	
3rd place, bronze medalist(s)	5	Ian Marsden	Great Britain	51.22	
4	4	Luis Cardoso da Silva	Brazil	51.631	
5	6	Rémy Boullé	France	52.084	
6	1	Lucas Díaz	Argentina	53.078	
7	7	Yu Xiaowei	China	53.088	
8	8	Colin Sieders	Australia	55.437	
