= 2017 ICF Canoe Sprint World Championships – Men's KL1 =

Men's KL1 at the 2017 ICF Canoe Sprint World Championships
- Venue: Sportcentrum Račice
- Location: Račice, Czech Republic
- Dates: 23–25 August
- Competitors: 11 from 9 nations
- Winning time: 47.116

Medalists
gold medal	Esteban Farias	Italy
silver medal	Róbert Suba	Hungary
bronze medal	Luis Cardoso da Silva	Brazil

The men's KL1 competition at the 2017 ICF Canoe Sprint World Championships in Račice took place at the Sportcentrum Račice.

== Schedule ==
The schedule was as follows:

Date	Time	Round
Wednesday 23 August 2017	09:00	Heats
Wednesday 23 August 2017	10:35	Semifinal
Friday 25 August 2017	15:35	Final

All times are Central European Summer Time (UTC+2)

== Results ==
=== Heats ===
The fastest three boats in each heat advanced directly to the final. The next four fastest boats in each heat, plus the fastest remaining boat advanced to the semifinal.

==== Heat 1 ====
Rank	Name	Country	Time	Notes
1	Róbert Suba	Hungary	50.856	QF
2	Jakub Tokarz	Poland	51.456	QF
3	Adrián Castaño	Spain	57.350	QF
4	Artur Chuprov	Russia	1:00.494	QS
5	Pavel Gromov	Russia	1:11.600	QS

==== Heat 2 ====
Rank	Name	Country	Time	Notes
1	Luis Cardoso da Silva	Brazil	50.527	QF
2	Ian Marsden	Great Britain	50.960	QF
3	Esteban Farias	Italy	50.971	QF
4	Tamás Juhász	Hungary	52.221	QS
5	Andrei Tkachuk	Belarus	52.294	QS
6	Rémy Boullé	France	1:03.199	QS

=== Semifinal ===
The fastest three boats advanced to the final.

Rank	Name	Country	Time	Notes
1	Andrei Tkachuk	Belarus	49.976	QF
2	Tamás Juhász	Hungary	51.487	QF
3	Rémy Boullé	France	52.020	QF
4	Pavel Gromov	Russia	1:01.643	
–	Artur Chuprov	Russia	DNF	

=== Final ===
Competitors raced for positions 1 to 9, with medals going to the top three.

Rank	Name	Country	Time
1st place, gold medalist(s)	Esteban Farias	Italy	47.116
2nd place, silver medalist(s)	Róbert Suba	Hungary	47.438
3rd place, bronze medalist(s)	Luis Cardoso da Silva	Brazil	48.016
4	Ian Marsden	Great Britain	49.605
5	Jakub Tokarz	Poland	49.788
6	Andrei Tkachuk	Belarus	49.916
7	Tamás Juhász	Hungary	50.099
8	Rémy Boullé	France	50.816
9	Adrián Castaño	Spain	55.394
