= 2018 ICF Canoe Sprint World Championships – Men's VL2 =

Men's VL2 at the 2018 ICF Canoe Sprint World Championships
- Venue: Centro de Alto Rendimento de Montemor-o-Velho
- Location: Montemor-o-Velho, Portugal
- Dates: 22–25 August
- Competitors: 16 from 12 nations
- Winning time: 54.316

Medalists
| gold medal | Igor Alex Tofalini | Brazil |
| silver medal | Luis Cardoso da Silva | Brazil |
| bronze medal | Marius Bogdan Ciustea | Italy |

The men's VL2 competition at the 2018 ICF Canoe Sprint World Championships in Montemor-o-Velho took place at the Centro de Alto Rendimento de Montemor-o-Velho.

== Schedule ==
The schedule was as follows:

| Date | Time | Round |
|---|---|---|
| Wednesday 22 August 2018 | 15:35 | Heats |
| Wednesday 22 August 2018 | 16:50 | Semifinal |
| Saturday 25 August 2018 | 10:41 | Final |

All times are Western European Summer Time (UTC+1)

== Results ==
=== Heats ===
The fastest three boats in each heat advanced directly to the final. The next four fastest boats in each heat, plus the fastest remaining boat advanced to the semifinal.

==== Heat 1 ====
| Rank | Name | Country | Time | Notes |
|---|---|---|---|---|
| 1 | Luis Cardoso da Silva | Brazil | 1:02.534 | QF |
| 2 | Higinio Rivero | Spain | 1:04.239 | QF |
| 3 | Tamás Juhász | Hungary | 1:05.024 | QF |
| 4 | Róbert Suba | Hungary | 1:06.564 | QS |
| 5 | Jakub Tokarz | Poland | 1:06.599 | QS |
| 6 | Cyrille Hureau | France | 1:09.175 | QS |
| 7 | Mathieu St-Pierre | Canada | 1:13.745 | QS |
| – | Oleksandr Suprun | Ukraine | DNF | |
| – | Andrei Tkachuk | Belarus | DNS | |

==== Heat 2 ====
| Rank | Name | Country | Time | Notes |
|---|---|---|---|---|
| 1 | Marius Bogdan Ciustea | Italy | 1:02.299 | QF |
| 2 | Igor Alex Tofalini | Brazil | 1:02.849 | QF |
| 3 | Roman Serebryakov | Russia | 1:03.609 | QF |
| 4 | Ilya Taupianets | Belarus | 1:07.824 | QS |
| 5 | Norberto Mourão | Portugal | 1:09.514 | QS |
| 6 | Raiarii Teuiau | Tahiti | 1:13.879 | QS |
| 7 | Floriano Jesus | Portugal | 1:31.465 | QS |

=== Semifinal ===
The fastest three boats advanced to the final.

| Rank | Name | Country | Time | Notes |
|---|---|---|---|---|
| 1 | Jakub Tokarz | Poland | 1:00.768 | QF |
| 2 | Mathieu St-Pierre | Canada | 1:01.278 | QF |
| 3 | Róbert Suba | Hungary | 1:01.623 | QF |
| 4 | Ilya Taupianets | Belarus | 1:02.153 | |
| 5 | Norberto Mourão | Portugal | 1:02.738 | |
| 6 | Cyrille Hureau | France | 1:04.248 | |
| 7 | Raiarii Teuiau | Tahiti | 1:11.329 | |
| 8 | Floriano Jesus | Portugal | 1:21.214 | |

=== Final ===
Competitors raced for positions 1 to 9, with medals going to the top three.

| Rank | Name | Country | Time |
|---|---|---|---|
| 1st place, gold medalist(s) | Igor Alex Tofalini | Brazil | 54.316 |
| 2nd place, silver medalist(s) | Luis Cardoso da Silva | Brazil | 54.911 |
| 3rd place, bronze medalist(s) | Marius Bogdan Ciustea | Italy | 55.246 |
| 4 | Tamás Juhász | Hungary | 55.706 |
| 5 | Roman Serebryakov | Russia | 55.931 |
| 6 | Róbert Suba | Hungary | 56.266 |
| 7 | Mathieu St-Pierre | Canada | 56.606 |
| 8 | Higinio Rivero | Spain | 56.811 |
| 9 | Jakub Tokarz | Poland | 58.106 |
