= 2019 ICF Canoe Sprint World Championships – Men's KL1 =

Men's KL1 at the 2019 ICF Canoe Sprint World Championships
- Venue: Olympic Centre of Szeged
- Location: Szeged, Hungary
- Dates: 21–23 August
- Competitors: 15 from 14 nations
- Winning time: 45.42

Medalists
gold medal	Péter Pál Kiss	Hungary
silver medal	Esteban Farias	Italy
bronze medal	Luis Cardoso da Silva	Brazil

The men's KL1 competition at the 2019 ICF Canoe Sprint World Championships in Szeged took place at the Olympic Centre of Szeged.

== Schedule ==
The schedule was as follows:

Date	Time	Round
Wednesday 21 August 2019	09:00	Heats
Wednesday 21 August 2019	12:15	Semifinal
Friday 23 August 2019	11:05	Final

All times are Central European Summer Time (UTC+2)

== Results ==
=== Heats ===
The fastest three boats in each heat advanced directly to the final.
The next four fastest boats in each heat, plus the fastest remaining boat advanced to the semifinal.

==== Heat 1 ====
Rank	Name	Country	Time	Notes
1	Esteban Farias	Italy	47.71	QF
2	Luis Cardoso da Silva	Brazil	48.21	QF
3	Róbert Suba	Hungary	48.76	QF
4	Rémy Boullé	France	49.94	QS
5	Pavel Gromov	Russia	53.98	QS
6	Adrián Castaño	Spain	56.16	QS
7	Robinson Méndez	Chile	59.05	QS
8	Andreas Potamitis	Cyprus	1:07.66	qS

==== Heat 2 ====
Rank	Name	Country	Time	Notes
1	Péter Pál Kiss	Hungary	46.16	QF
2	Ian Marsden	Great Britain	49.54	QF
3	Jakub Tokarz	Poland	49.84	QF
4	Yu Xiaowei	China	50.89	QS
5	Lucas Díaz	Argentina	52.68	QS
6	Floriano Jesus	Portugal	53.41	QS
7	Yuta Takagi	Japan	1:00.75	QS

=== Semifinal ===
The fastest three boats advanced to the final.

Rank	Name	Country	Time	Notes
1	Rémy Boullé	France	50.50	QF
2	Yu Xiaowei	China	52.08	QF
3	Lucas Díaz	Argentina	53.43	QF
4	Floriano Jesus	Portugal	54.35	
5	Pavel Gromov	Russia	55.82	
6	Adrián Castaño	Spain	57.60	
7	Robinson Méndez	Chile	1:00.32	
8	Yuta Takagi	Japan	1:03.67	
9	Andreas Potamitis	Cyprus	1:11.50	

=== Final ===
Competitors raced for positions 1 to 9, with medals going to the top three.

Rank	Name	Country	Time
1st place, gold medalist(s)	Péter Pál Kiss	Hungary	45.42
2nd place, silver medalist(s)	Esteban Farias	Italy	46.17
3rd place, bronze medalist(s)	Luis Cardoso da Silva	Brazil	46.49
4	Jakub Tokarz	Poland	47.09
5	Róbert Suba	Hungary	47.54
6	Ian Marsden	Great Britain	48.07
7	Rémy Boullé	France	48.35
8	Yu Xiaowei	China	48.65
9	Lucas Díaz	Argentina	52.76
