= 2024 ICF Paracanoe World Championships – Men's KL2 =

Men's KL2 at the 2024 ICF Paracanoe World Championships
- Venue: Olympic Centre of Szeged
- Location: Szeged, Hungary
- Dates: 9–10 May
- Competitors: 26 from 23 nations
- Winning time: 42.89

Medalists
gold medal	Curtis McGrath	Australia
silver medal	David Phillipson	Great Britain
bronze medal	Fernando Rufino	Brazil

The men's KL2 competition at the 2024 ICF Paracanoe World Championships in Szeged took place at the Olympic Centre of Szeged.

== Schedule ==
The schedule was as follows:

Date	Time	Round
Thursday 9 May 2024	9:05	Heats
Thursday 9 May 2024	11:40	Semifinals
Friday 10 May 2024	10:53	Final B
Friday 10 May 2024	11:11	Final A

All times are Central European Summer Time (UTC+2)

== Results ==
=== Heats ===
Heat winners advanced directly to the A final.
The next six fastest boats in each heat advanced to the semifinals.

==== Heat 1 ====
Rank	Name	Country	Time	Notes
1	Curtis McGrath	Australia	41.94	QA
2	Christian Volpi	Italy	43.73	QS
3	Uilian Ferreira Mendes	Brazil	44.45	QS
4	Emilio Ariel Atamanuk	Argentina	45.09	QS
5	Franco Gutiérrez	Chile	45.20	QS
6	Adi Ezra	Israel	47.95	QS
7	On Younho	South Korea	49.27	QS
8	Sanjeev Kotiya	India	51.09	
9	Martin Diatta	Senegal	51.50	

==== Heat 2 ====
Rank	Name	Country	Time	Notes
1	David Phillipson	Great Britain	41.78	QA
2	Mykola Syniuk	Ukraine	42.67	QS
3	Azizbek Abdulkhabibov	Uzbekistan	42.94	QS
4	Tibor Kiss	Hungary	44.03	QS
5	Javier Reja	Spain	47.34	QS
6	Olasupo Temitope	Nigeria	49.20	QS
7	Yury Samanenka	AIN	53.68	QS
8	Michael Ballard	United States	54.95	
9	Mauricio Grotiuz	Uruguay	55.82	

==== Heat 3 ====
Rank	Name	Country	Time	Notes
1	Scott Martlew	New Zealand	42.94	QA
2	Fernando Rufino	Brazil	43.25	QS
3	Federico Mancarella	Italy	43.68	QS
4	Strahinja Bukvić	Serbia	44.64	QS
5	Hiromi Tatsumi	Japan	48.20	QS
6	Ahmed Naguib	Egypt	49.50	QS
7	Anas Al Khalifa	Germany	49.58	QS
8	David Charbonnet	United States	1:05.71	

=== Semifinals ===
The fastest three boats in each semi advanced to the A final.
The next four fastest boats in each semi, plus the fastest remaining boat advanced to the B final.

==== Semifinal 1 ====
Rank	Name	Country	Time	Notes
1	Fernando Rufino	Brazil	42.44	QA
2	Azizbek Abdulkhabibov	Uzbekistan	43.26	QA
3	Tibor Kiss	Hungary	43.94	QA
4	Uilian Ferreira Mendes	Brazil	43.96	QB
5	Franco Gutiérrez	Chile	44.83	QB
6	Olasupo Temitope	Nigeria	47.18	QB
7	Adi Ezra	Israel	47.34	QB
8	Strahinja Bukvić	Serbia	48.79	qB
9	Anas Al Khalifa	Germany	49.66	

==== Semifinal 2 ====
Rank	Name	Country	Time	Notes
1	Christian Volpi	Italy	41.87	QA
2	Mykola Syniuk	Ukraine	42.43	QA
3	Federico Mancarella	Italy	42.79	QA
4	Emilio Ariel Atamanuk	Argentina	44.30	QB
5	Javier Reja	Spain	47.39	QB
6	On Younho	South Korea	47.89	QB
7	Hiromi Tatsumi	Japan	49.23	QB
8	Ahmed Naguib	Egypt	49.24	
9	Yury Samanenka	AIN	55.52	

=== Finals ===
==== Final B ====
Competitors raced for positions 10 to 18.

Rank	Name	Country	Time
1	Uilian Ferreira Mendes	Brazil	45.47
2	Emilio Ariel Atamanuk	Argentina	45.95
3	Strahinja Bukvić	Serbia	46.73
4	Franco Gutiérrez	Chile	47.24
5	Olasupo Temitope	Nigeria	49.91
6	Adi Ezra	Israel	50.42
7	On Younho	South Korea	50.98
8	Hiromi Tatsumi	Japan	50.99
9	Javier Reja	Spain	51.14

==== Final A ====
Competitors raced for positions 1 to 9, with medals going to the top three.

Rank	Name	Country	Time
1st place, gold medalist(s)	Curtis McGrath	Australia	42.89
2nd place, silver medalist(s)	David Phillipson	Great Britain	43.60
3rd place, bronze medalist(s)	Fernando Rufino	Brazil	43.64
4	Christian Volpi	Italy	43.83
5	Mykola Syniuk	Ukraine	43.86
6	Azizbek Abdulkhabibov	Uzbekistan	43.95
7	Federico Mancarella	Italy	44.39
8	Scott Martlew	New Zealand	44.98
9	Tibor Kiss	Hungary	46.26
