= 2021 ICF Canoe Sprint World Championships – Men's KL1 =

2021 canoe sprint

Men's KL1 at the 2021 ICF Canoe Sprint World Championships
- Venue: Lake Bagsværd
- Location: Copenhagen, Denmark
- Dates: 16–18 September
- Competitors: 14 from 11 nations
- Winning time: 45.94

Medalists
gold medal	Péter Pál Kiss	Hungary
silver medal	Luis Cardoso da Silva	Brazil
bronze medal	Róbert Suba	Hungary

The men's KL1 competition at the 2021 ICF Canoe Sprint World Championships in Copenhagen took place on Lake Bagsværd.

== Schedule ==
The schedule was as follows:

Date	Time	Round
Thursday 16 September 2021	09:00	Heats
Thursday 16 September 2021	11:30	Semifinal
Saturday 18 September 2021	10:20	Final

All times are Central European Summer Time (UTC+2)

== Results ==
=== Heats ===
The fastest three boats in each heat advanced directly to the final.
The next four fastest boats in each heat, plus the fastest remaining boat advanced to the semifinal.

==== Heat 1 ====
Rank	Name	Country	Time	Notes
1	Péter Pál Kiss	Hungary	49.24	QF
2	Rémy Boullé	France	50.22	QF
3	Aleksandr Ilichev	RCF	53.36	QF
4	Anas Al-Khalifa	Germany	53.87	QS
5	Ian Marsden	Great Britain	54.04	QS
6	Adrián Castaño	Spain	57.53	QS
7	Robinson Méndez	Chile	1:07.85	QS

==== Heat 2 ====
Rank	Name	Country	Time	Notes
1	Luis Cardoso da Silva	Brazil	47.41	QF
2	Róbert Suba	Hungary	48.76	QF
3	Alex Santos	Portugal	52.86	QF
4	Pavel Gromov	RCF	53.78	QS
5	Lucas Díaz	Argentina	55.91	QS
6	Artur Chuprov	RCF	57.72	QS
–	Yuta Takagi	Japan	DNS	

=== Semifinal ===
The fastest three boats advanced to the final.

Rank	Name	Country	Time	Notes
1	Pavel Gromov	RCF	55.21	QF
2	Lucas Díaz	Argentina	55.70	QF
3	Anas Al-Khalifa	Germany	55.95	QF
4	Ian Marsden	Great Britain	57.35	
5	Adrián Castaño	Spain	59.53	
6	Artur Chuprov	RCF	59.54	
7	Robinson Méndez	Chile	1:09.51	

=== Final ===
Competitors raced for positions 1 to 9, with medals going to the top three.

Rank	Name	Country	Time
1st place, gold medalist(s)	Péter Pál Kiss	Hungary	45.94
2nd place, silver medalist(s)	Luis Cardoso da Silva	Brazil	46.30
3rd place, bronze medalist(s)	Róbert Suba	Hungary	47.86
4	Rémy Boullé	France	48.57
5	Anas Al-Khalifa	Germany	52.54
6	Alex Santos	Portugal	52.77
7	Pavel Gromov	RCF	53.04
8	Lucas Díaz	Argentina	53.17
9	Aleksandr Ilichev	RCF	54.24
