= Canoe at the 2020 Summer Paralympics – Men's VL2 =

Men's VL2 at the XVI Paralympic Games
- Venue: Sea Forest Waterway
- Dates: 14–15 September 2021
- Competitors: 11 from 10 nations

Medalists
1st place, gold medalist(s)		Fernando Rufino de Paulo	Brazil
2nd place, silver medalist(s)		Steven Haxton	United States
3rd place, bronze medalist(s)		Norberto Mourão	Portugal

The Canoe Sprint men's VL2 event at the 2020 Summer Paralympics took place on 14 and 15 September 2021.

Two heats were held. Winners advanced directly to the final. The rest went into the semi-finals, where the top three in each semi-final advanced to the final.

This was the first event in the Paralympics to feature the Va'a outrigger boat.

== Schedule ==
Date	Time	Round
Thursday, 2 September 2021	11:10	Heats
Saturday, 4 September 2021	10:00	Semifinals
Saturday, 4 September 2021	11:12	Final A

== Results ==
=== Heats ===
Heat 1

Rank	Lane	Name	Nationality	Time	Notes
1	5	Fernando Rufino de Paulo	Brazil	55.258	FA, PB
2	4	Steven Haxton	United States	57.027	SF
3	7	Igor Korobeynikov	RPC	57.420	SF
4	6	Luis Cardoso da Silva	Brazil	58.000	SF
5	3	Mathieu St-Pierre	Canada	59.683	SF
6	2	Anas Al Khalifa	Refugee Paralympic Team	1:04.658	SF

Heat 2

Rank	Lane	Name	Nationality	Time	Notes
1	5	Norberto Mourão	Portugal	57.831	FA
2	4	Higinio Rivero	Spain	58.366	SF
3	6	Tamás Juhász	Hungary	58.699	SF
4	2	Eslam Jahedi	Iran	1:01.395	SF
5	3	Ilya Taupianets	Belarus	1:02.429	SF

=== Semifinals ===
Semifinal 1

Rank	Lane	Name	Nationality	Time	Notes
1	4	Steven Haxton	United States	54.576	FA, PB
2	5	Tamás Juhász	Hungary	55.818	FA
3	6	Mathieu St-Pierre	Canada	56.025	FA
4	3	Eslam Jahedi	Iran	58.057	

Semifinal 2

Rank	Lane	Name	Nationality	Time	Notes
1	4	Higinio Rivero	Spain	55.195	FA
2	5	Igor Korobeynikov	RPC	55.357	FA
3	3	Luis Cardoso da Silva	Brazil	57.725	FA
4	6	Ilya Taupianets	Belarus	59.736	
5	2	Anas Al Khalifa	Refugee Paralympic Team	1:01.467	

=== Final A ===
Rank	Lane	Name	Nationality	Time	Notes
1st place, gold medalist(s)	5	Fernando Rufino de Paulo	Brazil	53.077	PB
2nd place, silver medalist(s)	6	Steven Haxton	United States	55.093	
3rd place, bronze medalist(s)	4	Norberto Mourão	Portugal	55.365	
4	7	Igor Korobeynikov	RPC	55.681	
5	8	Mathieu St-Pierre	Canada	56.029	
6	3	Higinio Rivero	Spain	56.058	
7	1	Luis Cardoso da Silva	Brazil	56.390	
8	2	Tamás Juhász	Hungary	57.193	
