= 2021 ICF Canoe Sprint World Championships – Men's VL2 =

Men's VL2 at the 2021 ICF Canoe Sprint World Championships
- Venue: Lake Bagsværd
- Location: Copenhagen, Denmark
- Dates: 16–17 September
- Competitors: 12 from 10 nations
- Winning time: 53.93

Medalists
gold medal	Fernando Rufino de Paulo	Brazil
silver medal	Higinio Rivero	Spain
bronze medal	Norberto Mourão	Portugal

The men's VL2 competition at the 2021 ICF Canoe Sprint World Championships in Copenhagen took place on Lake Bagsværd.

== Schedule ==
The schedule was as follows:

Date	Time	Round
Thursday 16 September 2021	16:05	Heats
Friday 17 September 2021	10:50	Semifinal
Friday 17 September 2021	15:35	Final

All times are Central European Summer Time (UTC+2)

== Results ==
=== Heats ===
The fastest three boats in each heat advanced directly to the final.
The next four fastest boats in each heat, plus the fastest remaining boat advanced to the semifinal.

==== Heat 1 ====
Rank	Name	Country	Time	Notes
1	Fernando Rufino de Paulo	Brazil	54.10	QF
2	Andrii Kryvchun	Ukraine	57.70	QF
3	Luis Cardoso da Silva	Brazil	58.44	QF
4	Róbert Suba	Hungary	58.55	QS
5	Marius-Bogdan Ciustea	Italy	58.67	QS
6	Stewart Clark	Great Britain	1:01.24	QS

==== Heat 2 ====
Rank	Name	Country	Time	Notes
1	Higinio Rivero	Spain	55.87	QF
2	Igor Korobeynikov	RCF	55.88	QF
3	Norberto Mourão	Portugal	56.02	QF
4	Mathieu St-Pierre	Canada	56.55	QS
5	Takanori Kato	Japan	1:07.94	QS
–	Roman Serebryakov	RCF	DNS	

=== Semifinal ===
The fastest three boats advanced to the final.

Rank	Name	Country	Time	Notes
1	Mathieu St-Pierre	Canada	57.08	QF
2	Róbert Suba	Hungary	58.25	QF
3	Marius-Bogdan Ciustea	Italy	58.54	QF
4	Stewart Clark	Great Britain	1:02.38	
5	Takanori Kato	Japan	1:09.52	

=== Final ===
Competitors raced for positions 1 to 9, with medals going to the top three.

Rank	Name	Country	Time
1st place, gold medalist(s)	Fernando Rufino de Paulo	Brazil	53.93
2nd place, silver medalist(s)	Higinio Rivero	Spain	56.21
3rd place, bronze medalist(s)	Norberto Mourão	Portugal	56.54
4	Igor Korobeynikov	RCF	56.78
5	Mathieu St-Pierre	Canada	57.05
6	Andrii Kryvchun	Ukraine	57.13
7	Róbert Suba	Hungary	57.92
8	Luis Cardoso da Silva	Brazil	57.94
9	Marius-Bogdan Ciustea	Italy	58.17
