= 2025 ICF Canoe Sprint World Championships – Men's KL1 =

Men's KL1 at the 2025 ICF Canoe Sprint World Championships
- Venue: Idroscalo Regatta Course
- Location: Milan, Italy
- Dates: 20–23 August
- Competitors: 14 from 12 nations
- Winning time: 45.96

Medalists
gold medal	Péter Pál Kiss	Hungary
silver medal	Luis Cardoso da Silva	Brazil
bronze medal	Aleksandr Ilichev	Individual Neutral Athletes

The men's KL1 200 metres competition at the 2025 ICF Canoe Sprint World Championships in Milan took place in Idroscalo Regatta Course.

== Schedule ==
The schedule is as follows:

Date	Time	Round
Wednesday 20 August 2025	10:22	Heats
Thursday 21 August 2025	11:37	Semifinals
Saturday 23 August 2025	10:00	Final

== Results ==
=== Heats ===
The fastest three boats in each heat advanced directly to the final (FA). The next four fastest boats in each heat, plus the fastest remaining boat advanced to the semifinal (QS).

==== Heat 1 ====
Rank	Canoeist	Country	Time	Notes
1	Péter Pál Kiss	Hungary	45.43	FA
2	Luis Cardoso da Silva	Brazil	46.89	FA
3	Aleksandr Ilichev	Individual Neutral Athletes	49.32	FA
4	Alex Santos	Portugal	52.91	QS
5	Maxim Bogatyrev	Kazakhstan	55.74	QS
6	Benjamin Sainsbury	Australia	58.23	QS
7	Paitoon Pimpisan	Thailand	1:33.44	QS

==== Heat 2 ====
Rank	Canoeist	Country	Time	Notes
1	Rémy Boullé	France	50.15	FA
2	Róbert Suba	Hungary	52.06	FA
3	Pavel Gromov	Individual Neutral Athletes	54.09	FA
4	Worrawut Samart	Thailand	59.15	QS
5	Zhu Jianrong	China	59.43	QS
6	Yash Kumar	India	1:02.05	QS
7	Yuta Takagi	Japan	1:02.35	QS

=== Semifinal ===
The fastest three boats advanced to the final.

Rank	Canoeist	Country	Time	Notes
1	Alex Santos	Portugal	50.85	FA
2	Zhu Jianrong	China	51.99	FA
3	Maxim Bogatyrev	Kazakhstan	54.97	FA
4	Benjamin Sainsbury	Australia	56.41	
5	Worrawut Samart	Thailand	57.88	
6	Yash Kumar	India	58.81	
7	Yuta Takagi	Japan	1:01.59	
8	Paitoon Pimpisan	Thailand	1:29.08	

=== Final ===
Competitors raced for positions 1 to 9, with medals going to the top three.

Rank	Canoeist	Country	Time	Notes
1st place, gold medalist(s)	Péter Pál Kiss	Hungary	45.96	
2nd place, silver medalist(s)	Luis Cardoso da Silva	Brazil	46.93	
3rd place, bronze medalist(s)	Aleksandr Ilichev	Individual Neutral Athletes	49.63	
4	Rémy Boullé	France	50.28	
5	Alex Santos	Portugal	51.92	
6	Róbert Suba	Hungary	52.50	
7	Zhu Jianrong	China	53.95	
8	Pavel Gromov	Individual Neutral Athletes	54.95	
9	Maxim Bogatyrev	Kazakhstan	56.43	
