= 2018 ICF Canoe Sprint World Championships – Men's KL1 =

Men's KL1 at the 2018 ICF Canoe Sprint World Championships
- Venue: Centro de Alto Rendimento de Montemor-o-Velho
- Location: Montemor-o-Velho, Portugal
- Dates: 22–23 August
- Competitors: 13 from 11 nations
- Winning time: 49.796

Medalists
gold medal	Esteban Farias	Italy
silver medal	Róbert Suba	Hungary
bronze medal	Luis Cardoso da Silva	Brazil

The men's KL1 competition at the 2018 ICF Canoe Sprint World Championships in Montemor-o-Velho took place at the Centro de Alto Rendimento de Montemor-o-Velho.

== Schedule ==
The schedule was as follows:

Date	Time	Round
Wednesday 22 August 2018	11:00	Heats
Wednesday 22 August 2018	12:30	Semifinal
Thursday 23 August 2018	16:40	Final

All times are Western European Summer Time (UTC+1)

== Results ==
=== Heats ===
The fastest three boats in each heat advanced directly to the final. The next four fastest boats in each heat, plus the fastest remaining boat advanced to the semifinal.

==== Heat 1 ====
Rank	Name	Country	Time	Notes
1	Esteban Farias	Italy	49.453	QF
2	Ian Marsden	Great Britain	50.403	QF
3	Jakub Tokarz	Poland	51.243	QF
4	Floriano Jesus	Portugal	54.798	QS
5	Lucas Díaz	Argentina	55.624	QS
6	Robinson Méndez	Chile	1:07.374	QS
–	Paulo Santos	Portugal	DNS	

==== Heat 2 ====
Rank	Name	Country	Time	Notes
1	Róbert Suba	Hungary	50.061	QF
2	Luis Cardoso da Silva	Brazil	50.856	QF
3	Tamás Juhász	Hungary	51.731	QF
4	Yu Xiaowei	China	51.931	QS
5	Adrián Castaño	Spain	1:08.742	QS
6	Yuta Takagi	Japan	1:11.247	QS

=== Semifinal ===
The fastest three boats advanced to the final.

Rank	Name	Country	Time	Notes
1	Yu Xiaowei	China	53.091	QF
2	Floriano Jesus	Portugal	54.892	QF
3	Lucas Díaz	Argentina	56.557	QF
4	Adrián Castaño	Spain	1:03.812	
5	Robinson Méndez	Chile	1:06.267	
6	Yuta Takagi	Japan	1:09.237	

=== Final ===
Competitors raced for positions 1 to 9, with medals going to the top three.

Rank	Name	Country	Time
1st place, gold medalist(s)	Esteban Farias	Italy	49.796
2nd place, silver medalist(s)	Róbert Suba	Hungary	50.606
3rd place, bronze medalist(s)	Luis Cardoso da Silva	Brazil	51.376
4	Tamás Juhász	Hungary	51.781
5	Jakub Tokarz	Poland	52.896
6	Ian Marsden	Great Britain	53.271
7	Floriano Jesus	Portugal	54.951
8	Yu Xiaowei	China	54.966
9	Lucas Díaz	Argentina	1:01.416
