= 2022 ICF Canoe Sprint World Championships – Men's VL2 =

Men's VL2 at the 2022 ICF Canoe Sprint World Championships
- Venue: Lake Banook
- Location: Dartmouth, Canada
- Dates: 4–6 August
- Competitors: 12 from 10 nations
- Winning time: 51.67

Medalists
gold medal	Igor Tofalini	Brazil
silver medal	Fernando Rufino de Paulo	Brazil
bronze medal	Norberto Mourão	Portugal

The men's VL2 competition at the 2022 ICF Canoe Sprint World Championships in Dartmouth took place on Lake Banook.

== Schedule ==
The schedule was as follows:

Date	Time	Round
Thursday 4 August 2022	10:00	Heats
Thursday 4 August 2022	15:50	Semifinal
Saturday 6 August 2022	10:28	Final

All times are Atlantic Daylight Time (UTC−3)

== Results ==
=== Heats ===
The fastest three boats in each heat advanced directly to the final.
The next four fastest boats in each heat, plus the fastest remaining boat advanced to the semifinal.

==== Heat 1 ====
Rank	Canoeist	Country	Time	Notes
1	Igor Tofalini	Brazil	54.19	QF
2	Steven Haxton	United States	57.15	QF
3	Higinio Rivero	Spain	57.63	QF
4	Mathieu St-Pierre	Canada	58.33	QS
5	Andrii Kryvchun	Ukraine	59.24	QS
6	Takanori Kato	Japan	1:07.56	QS

==== Heat 2 ====
Rank	Canoeist	Country	Time	Notes
1	Fernando Rufino de Paulo	Brazil	55.24	QF
2	Norberto Mourão	Portugal	58.44	QF
3	Róbert Suba	Hungary	59.61	QF
4	Marius Ciustea	Italy	1:01.57	QS
5	Stewart Clark	Great Britain	1:02.49	QS
6	Yves Bourque	Canada	1:07.91	QS

=== Semifinal ===
The fastest three boats advanced to the final.

Rank	Canoeist	Country	Time	Notes
1	Mathieu St-Pierre	Canada	59.22	QF
2	Andrii Kryvchun	Ukraine	1:00.93	QF
3	Marius Ciustea	Italy	1:01.23	QF
4	Stewart Clark	Great Britain	1:01.69	
5	Yves Bourque	Canada	1:04.78	
6	Takanori Kato	Japan	1:09.52	

=== Final ===
Competitors raced for positions 1 to 9, with medals going to the top three.

Rank	Name	Country	Time
1st place, gold medalist(s)	Igor Tofalini	Brazil	51.67
2nd place, silver medalist(s)	Fernando Rufino de Paulo	Brazil	52.00
3rd place, bronze medalist(s)	Norberto Mourão	Portugal	53.26
4	Higinio Rivero	Spain	53.67
5	Róbert Suba	Hungary	54.05
6	Steven Haxton	United States	54.75
7	Mathieu St-Pierre	Canada	54.86
8	Andrii Kryvchun	Ukraine	55.51
9	Marius Ciustea	Italy	57.23
