= Canoe at the 2020 Summer Paralympics – Men's KL1 =

Men's KL1 at the XVI Paralympic Games
- Venue: Sea Forest Waterway
- Dates: 2–3 September 2021
- Competitors: 12 from 11 nations

Medalists
1st place, gold medalist(s)		Péter Pál Kiss	Hungary
2nd place, silver medalist(s)		Luis Cardoso da Silva	Brazil
3rd place, bronze medalist(s)		Rémy Boullé	France

The Canoe Sprint men's KL1 event at the 2020 Paralympic Games took place on 2 and 3 September 2021. Two initial heats were held. Winners advanced directly to the final. The rest went into one of two semifinals, where the top three in each semifinal also advanced to the final.

2019 world champion Péter Pál Kiss won the gold medal.

== Schedule ==
Date	Time	Round
Thursday, 2 September 2021	09:30	Heats
Friday, 3 September 2021	09:30	Semifinals
Friday, 3 September 2021	10:49	Finals

== Results ==
=== Heats ===
Heat 1

Rank	Lane	Name	Nationality	Time	Notes
1	5	Péter Pál Kiss	Hungary	48.058	FA, PB
2	2	Yu Xiaowei	China	54.551	SF
3	3	Alex Santos	Portugal	54.863	SF
4	7	Ian Marsden	Great Britain	55.601	SF
5	4	Pavel Gromov	RPC	56.390	SF
6	6	Anas Al-Khalifa	Refugee Paralympic Team	57.010	SF

Heat 2

Rank	Lane	Name	Nationality	Time	Notes
1	5	Luis Cardoso da Silva	Brazil	49.840	FA
2	4	Rémy Boullé	France	51.726	SF
3	7	Tamás Juhász	Hungary	52.820	SF
4	3	Adrián Castaño	Spain	57.020	SF
5	2	Lucas Díaz	Argentina	57.033	SF
6	6	Yuta Takagi	Japan	1:00.765	SF

=== Semifinals ===
Semifinal 1

Rank	Lane	Name	Nationality	Time	Notes
1	5	Tamás Juhász	Hungary	50.465	FA
2	6	Pavel Gromov	RPC	51.35	FA
3	4	Yu Xiaowei	China	51.51	FA
4	3	Adrián Castaño	Spain	54.547	FB
5	2	Yuta Takagi	Japan	58.259	FB

Semifinal 2

Rank	Lane	Name	Nationality	Time	Notes
1	4	Rémy Boullé	France	48.645	FA
2	5	Alex Santos	Portugal	52.406	FA
3	3	Ian Marsden	Great Britain	52.806	FA
4	6	Lucas Díaz	Argentina	53.105	FB
5	2	Anas Al-Khalifa	Refugee Paralympic Team	53.654	FB

=== Finals ===
Final B

Rank	Lane	Name	Nationality	Time	Notes
9	3	Anas Al-Khalifa	Refugee Paralympic Team	54.265	
10	5	Lucas Díaz	Argentina	54.345	
11	4	Adrián Castaño	Spain	55.539	
12	6	Yuta Takagi	Japan	58.509	

Final A

Rank	Lane	Name	Nationality	Time	Notes
1st place, gold medalist(s)	4	Péter Pál Kiss	Hungary	45.447	PB
2nd place, silver medalist(s)	5	Luis Cardoso da Silva	Brazil	48.031	
3rd place, bronze medalist(s)	6	Rémy Boullé	France	48.917	
4	7	Pavel Gromov	RPC	52.111	
5	2	Alex Santos	Portugal	52.507	
6	3	Tamás Juhász	Hungary	52.59	
7	1	Yu Xiaowei	China	52.597	
8	8	Ian Marsden	Great Britain	52.848	
