= 2026 ICF Canoe Sprint World Championships – Men's VL2 =

Men's VL1 at the 2026 ICF Canoe Sprint World Championships
- Venue: Lake Malta
- Location: Poznań, Poland
- Dates: 26–28 August
- Winning time: 49.71

Medalists
gold medal	Steven Haxton	United States
silver medal	Fernando Rufino	Brazil
bronze medal	Igor Alex Tofalini	Brazil

The men's VL2 competition at the 2026 ICF Canoe Sprint World Championships in Poznań took place at Lake Malta.

== Schedule ==
The schedule is as follows:

Date	Time	Round
Wednesday 26 August 2026	17:14	Heats
Friday 28 August 2026	09:05	Semifinals
Saturday 29 August 2026	13:40	Final B
Saturday 29 August 2026	15:36	Final A

=== Finals ===
Competitors raced for positions 1 to 9, with medals going to the top three.

Rank	Lane	Name	Nation	Time	Gap
1st place, gold medalist(s)	7	Steven Haxton	United States	49.71	
2nd place, silver medalist(s)	4	Fernando Rufino	Brazil	51.34	+1.63
3rd place, bronze medalist(s)	5	Igor Alex Tofalini	Brazil	51.87	+2.16
4	2	Norberto Mourão	Portugal	52.78	+3.07
5	6	Edward Clifton	Great Britain	52.81	+3.10
6	1	Andrii Kryvhun	Ukraine	52.81	+3.10
7	3	Xander Van der Poll	Great Britain	53.20	+3.49
8	8	Higinio Rivero	Spain	53.76	+4.05
9	9	Roman Serebriakov	Individual Neutral Athletes-A	54.42	+4.71
