= 2022 ICF Canoe Sprint World Championships – Men's KL1 =

Men's KL1 at the 2022 ICF Canoe Sprint World Championships
- Venue: Lake Banook
- Location: Dartmouth, Canada
- Dates: 5 August
- Competitors: 9 from 8 nations
- Winning time: 48.40

Medalists
gold medal	Péter Pál Kiss	Hungary
silver medal	Luis Cardoso da Silva	Brazil
bronze medal	Rémy Boullé	France

The men's KL1 competition at the 2022 ICF Canoe Sprint World Championships in Dartmouth took place on Lake Banook.

== Schedule ==
The schedule was as follows:

Date	Time	Round
Friday 5 August 2022	11:20	Final

All times are Atlantic Daylight Time (UTC−3)

== Results ==
With fewer than ten competitors entered, this event was held as a direct final.

Rank	Name	Country	Time
1st place, gold medalist(s)	Péter Pál Kiss	Hungary	48.40
2nd place, silver medalist(s)	Luis Cardoso da Silva	Brazil	49.14
3rd place, bronze medalist(s)	Rémy Boullé	France	50.98
4	Róbert Suba	Hungary	52.34
5	Alex Santos	Portugal	53.86
6	Adrián Castaño	Spain	57.71
7	Benjamin Sainsbury	Australia	1:05.79
8	Robinson Mendez	Chile	1:09.43
9	Surender Kumar	India	2:33.11
