= 2023 ICF Canoe Sprint World Championships – Men's KL1 =

Men's KL1 at the 2023 ICF Canoe Sprint World Championships
- Venue: Sportpark Duisburg
- Location: Duisburg, Germany
- Dates: 23–25 August
- Competitors: 18 from 15 nations
- Winning time: 45.193

Medalists
gold medal	Péter Pál Kiss	Hungary
silver medal	Rémy Boullé	France
bronze medal	Luis Cardoso da Silva	Brazil

The men's KL1 competition at the 2023 ICF Canoe Sprint World Championships in Duisburg took place at Sportpark Duisburg.

== Schedule ==
The schedule was as follows:

Date	Time	Round
Wednesday 23 August 2023	10:35	Heats
Friday 25 August 2023	9:20	Semifinal
Friday 25 August 2023	16:44	Final

All times are Central European Summer Time (UTC+2)

== Results ==
=== Heats ===
The fastest three boats in each heat advanced directly to the final.
The next four fastest boats in each heat, plus the fastest remaining boat advanced to the semifinal.

==== Heat 1 ====
Rank	Name	Country	Time	Notes
1	Péter Pál Kiss	Hungary	45.088	QF
2	Rémy Boullé	France	45.970	QF
3	Luciano Pereira Lima	Brazil	49.135	QF
4	Alex Santos	Portugal	50.263	QS
5	Maxim Bogatyrev	Kazakhstan	57.731	QS
6	Benjamin Sainsbury	Australia	58.969	QS
7	Yuta Takagi	Japan	59.794	QS
8	Mathieu St-Pierre	Canada	1:01.975	
9	Surender Kumar	India	1:28.971	

==== Heat 2 ====
Rank	Name	Country	Time	Notes
1	Luis Cardoso da Silva	Brazil	46.356	QF
2	Róbert Suba	Hungary	49.190	QF
3	Yu Xiaowei	China	50.687	QF
4	Floriano Jesus	Portugal	51.997	QS
5	Adrián Castaño	Spain	53.179	QS
6	Saeid Hosseinpoorzarouni	Iran	53.403	QS
7	Yash Kumar	India	59.682	QS
8	Kwanghyun Kim	South Korea	1:00.027	QS
9	Robinson Méndez	Chile	1:05.611	

=== Semifinal ===
The fastest three boats advanced to the final.

Rank	Name	Country	Time	Notes
1	Saeid Hosseinpoorzarouni	Iran	51.686	QF
2	Alex Santos	Portugal	52.205	QF
3	Floriano Jesus	Portugal	52.295	QF
4	Adrián Castaño	Spain	53.465	
5	Maxim Bogatyrev	Kazakhstan	1:00.106	
6	Benjamin Sainsbury	Australia	1:00.114	
7	Kim Kwanghyun	South Korea	1:00.754	
8	Yash Kumar	India	1:00.877	
9	Yuta Takagi	Japan	1:01.553	

=== Final ===
Competitors raced for positions 1 to 9, with medals going to the top three.

Rank	Name	Country	Time
1st place, gold medalist(s)	Péter Pál Kiss	Hungary	45.193
2nd place, silver medalist(s)	Rémy Boullé	France	46.036
3rd place, bronze medalist(s)	Luis Cardoso da Silva	Brazil	46.542
4	Róbert Suba	Hungary	47.608
5	Saeid Hosseinpoorzarouni	Iran	48.875
6	Luciano Pereira Lima	Brazil	49.300
7	Yu Xiaowei	China	50.491
8	Alex Santos	Portugal	50.651
9	Floriano Jesus	Portugal	51.850
