= 2026 ICF Canoe Sprint World Championships – Men's KL1 =

Men's KL1 at the 2026 ICF Canoe Sprint World Championships
- Venue: Lake Malta
- Location: Poznań, Poland
- Dates: 26-30 August
- Winning time: 46.35

Medalists
gold medal	Péter Pál Kiss	Hungary
silver medal	Luis Cardoso da Silva	Brazil
bronze medal	Aleksandr Ilichev	Individual Neutral Athletes

The men's KL1 competition at the 2026 ICF Canoe Sprint World Championships in Poznań took place at Lake Malta.

== Schedule ==
The schedule is as follows:

Date	Time	Round
Wednesday 26 August 2026	10:35	Heats
Thursday 27 August 2026	11:31	Semifinals
Saturday 29 August 2026	10:39	Final B
Saturday 29 August 2026	10:50	Final A

== Record ==
The best performance previously in this discipline was:

Men's KL1 200 metres
World Best	44.55	Péter Pál Kiss (HUN)	Paris (France)

=== Heats ===
Qualification rule : Winner of each heat direct to A final; remainder to semi final

Heat 1

Rank	Bib	Name	Nation	Time	Gap	Notes
1	5	Péter Pál Kiss	Hungary	51.11	-	FA
2	4	Alex Santos	Portugal	59.48	+8.37	SF
3	6	Jianrong Zhu	China	1:00.20	+9.09	SF
4	2	Yash Kumar	India	1:05.17	+14.06	SF
5	7	Yassin Awad	Egypt	1:11.11	+20.00	SF
6	3	Thomas Price	Great Britain	1:11.82	+20.71	SF
7	8	Eiichi Yamashita	Japan	1:18.01	+26.90	SF

Heat 2

Rank	Bib	Name	Nation	Time	Gap	Notes
1	4	Robert Suba	Hungary	52.08	-	FA
2	5	Luis Cardoso da Silva	Brazil	53.11	+1.03	SF
3	7	Xiaowei Yu	China	58.08	+6.00	SF
4	6	Maxim Bogatyrev	Kazakhstan	1:00.58	+8.50	SF
5	2	Adrian Castano	Spain	1:04.89	+12.81	SF
6	3	Anatolii Zhumik	Ukraine	1:58.84	+1:06.76	SF

Heat 3

Rank	Bib	Name	Nation	Time	Gap	Notes
1	4	Remy Boulle	France	51.37	-	FA
2	5	Aleksandr Ilichev	Neutral Athlete B	52.73	+1.36	SF
3	7	Dennis Braun	Germany	1:00.23	+8.86	SF
4	2	Benjamin Sainsbury	Australia	1:01.75	+10.38	SF
5	6	Worrawut Samart	Thailand	1:05.10	+13.73	SF
6	3	Yuta Takagi	Japan	1:07.81	+16.44	SF

=== Semi finals ===
Two semi finals were held: the results of the semi finals were as follows:

Qualification rule : top three in each heat proceed to A final; next four in each heat plus next best on time to B final

Semifinal 1

Rank	Bib	Name	Nation	Time	Gap	Notes
1	4	Aleksandr Ilichev	Neutral Athlete B	53.74		FA
2	5	Luis Cardoso da Silva	Brazil	55.39	+1.65	FA
3	6	Jianrong Zhu	China	1:00.19	+6.45	FA
4	3	Maxim Bogatyrev	Kazakhstan	1:02.24	+8.50	FB
5	2	Worrawut Samart	Thailand	1:08.22	+14.48	FB
6	7	Yassin Awad	Egypt	1:10.28	+16.54	FB
7	1	Eiichi Yamashita	Japan	1:30.86	+37.12	FB
8	8	Anatolii Zhumik	Ukraine	2:06.73	+1:12.99	

Semifinal 2

Rank	Bib	Name	Nation	Time	Gap	Notes
1	4	Xiaowei Yu	China	57.58		FA
2	5	Alex Santos	Portugal	1:00.41	+2.83	FA
3	3	Benjamin Sainsbury	Australia	1:01.64	+4.06	FA
4	2	Adrian Castano	Spain	1:01.78	+4.20	FB
5	6	Dennis Braun	Germany	1:03.82	+6.24	FB
6	7	Yash Kumar	India	1:07.52	+9.94	FB
7	8	Yuta Takagi	Japan	1:10.01	+12.43	FB
8	1	Thomas Price	Great Britain	1:13.73	+16.15	qBT

=== Finals ===
The results of the finals were as follows:

B final

Rank	Bib	Name	Nation	Time	Gap	Notes
1	3	Dennis Braun	Germany	54.87		
2	5	Adrian Castano	Spain	55.74	+0.87	
3	4	Maxim Bogatyrev	Kazakhstan	55.90	+1.03	
4	6	Worrawut Samart	Thailand	57.39	+2.52	
5	2	Yassin Awad	Egypt	1:00.18	+5.31	
6	1	Yuta Takagi	Japan	1:01.18	+6.31	
7	7	Yash Kumar	India	1:02.86	+7.99	
8	9	Thomas Price	Great Britain	1:06.91	+12.04	
9	8	Eiichi Yamashita	Japan	1:10.70	+15.83	

A final

Rank	Bib	Name	Nation	Time	Gap
1st place, gold medalist(s)	5	Péter Pál Kiss	Hungary	46.35	
2nd place, silver medalist(s)	2	Luis Cardoso da Silva	Brazil	47.25	+0.90
3rd place, bronze medalist(s)	7	Aleksandr Ilichev	Neutral Athlete A	48.39	+2.04
4	6	Remy Boulle	France	48.48	+2.13
5	4	Robert Suba	Hungary	48.55	+2.20
6	9	Jianrong Zhu	China	53.44	+7.09
7	8	Alex Santos	Portugal	53.50	+7.15
8	3	Yu Xiaowei	China	53.85	+7.50
9	1	Benjamin Sainsbury	Australia	58.41	+12.06
