= 2017 ICF Canoe Sprint World Championships – Men's VL1 =

Men's VL1 at the 2017 ICF Canoe Sprint World Championships
- Venue: Sportcentrum Račice
- Location: Račice, Czech Republic
- Dates: 23 August
- Competitors: 5 from 4 nations
- Winning time: 55.356

Medalists
gold medal	Luis Cardoso da Silva	Brazil
silver medal	Róbert Suba	Hungary
bronze medal	Pavel Gromov	Russia

The men's VL1 competition at the 2017 ICF Canoe Sprint World Championships in Račice took place at the Sportcentrum Račice.

== Schedule ==
The schedule was as follows:

Date	Time	Round
Wednesday 23 August 2017	15:00	Final

All times are Central European Summer Time (UTC+2)

== Results ==
With fewer than ten competitors entered, this event was held as a direct final.

Rank	Name	Country	Time
1st place, gold medalist(s)	Luis Cardoso da Silva	Brazil	55.356
2nd place, silver medalist(s)	Róbert Suba	Hungary	58.617
3rd place, bronze medalist(s)	Pavel Gromov	Russia	59.689
4	Jakub Tokarz	Poland	1:00.028
5	Artur Chuprov	Russia	1:06.306
