= Fernando Rufino =

Brazilian Para canoeist (born 1985)

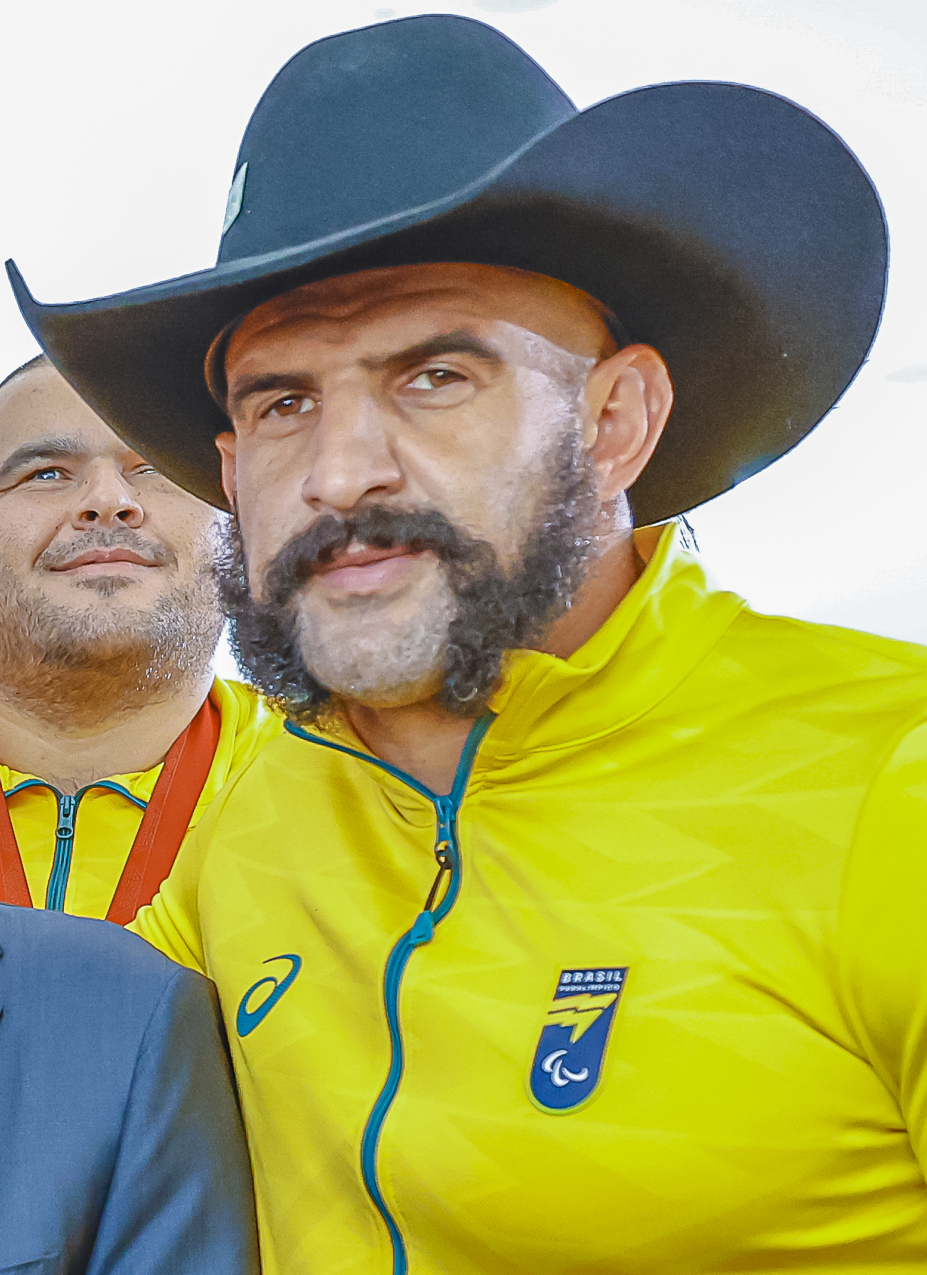
- Rufino in September 2024

Personal information
- Full name: Fernando Rufino de Paulo
- Nickname: Cowboy
- Born: 22 May 1985 (age 41) Eldorado, Brazil

Sport
- Country: Brazil
- Sport: Para canoe
- Disability class: KL2, VL2
Medal record
Men's Para canoe
Representing Brazil
Paralympic Games
Gold medal – first place	2020 Tokyo	VL2
Gold medal – first place	2024 Paris	VL2
World Championships
Gold medal – first place	2021 Copenhagen	VL2
Gold medal – first place	2023 Duisburg	VL2
Gold medal – first place	2024 Szeged	VL2
Gold medal – first place	2025 MIlan	VL2
Silver medal – second place	2014 Moscow	K–1 TA
Silver medal – second place	2022 Dartmouth	VL2
Silver medal – second place	2026 Poznán	VL2
Bronze medal – third place	2015 Milan	KL2
Bronze medal – third place	2024 Szeged	KL2

Fernando Rufino de Paulo (born 22 May 1985) is a Brazilian Para canoeist. He represented Brazil at the 2020 and 2024 Summer Paralympics.

== Career ==
Rufino represented Brazil at the 2020 Summer Paralympics in the men's VL2 event and won a gold medal. He again represented Brazil at the 2024 Summer Paralympics in the men's VL2 event and won a gold medal.
