= Canoe at the 2024 Summer Paralympics =

Canoe at the XVII Paralympic Games
- Paralympic Canoe
- Venue: Vaires-sur-Marne Nautical Stadium, National Olympic Nautical Stadium of Île-de-France, Vaires-sur-Marne
- Dates: 6–8 September 2024
- Competitors: 100 from 30 nations

Canoe at the 2024 Summer Paralympics in Paris, France took place at Vaires-sur-Marne Nautical Stadium, the same venue that hosted rowing. This was the third appearance of Para canoe in the Summer Paralympics. There were five canoe sprint events for both men and women, three in kayak and two in va'a in each category.

== Qualification ==
100 slots (50 male, 50 female) are allocated. An NPC can earn a maximum of one eligible canoeist quota per medal event and a maximum of five male and five female quota slots in total. However, the NPC can enter up to two athletes in an event if an athlete has qualified in one boat (Kayak or outrigger), but is also eligible for the classification in the other type of boat in which a different athlete has won a quota.

Means of qualification	Date	Venue	Men					Women					Total
Means of qualification	Date	Venue	KL1	KL2	KL3	VL2	VL3	KL1	KL2	KL3	VL2	VL3	Total
2023 World Championships	23–26 August 2023	(Germany) Duisburg	Brazil; China; France; Hungary; Iran; Portugal	Austria; Italy; Kazakhstan; New Zealand; Ukraine; Uzbekistan	Algeria; Australia; Great Britain; Italy; Poland; Spain	Brazil; Hungary; Portugal; Spain; Ukraine; United States	Argentina; France; Great Britain; Spain; Ukraine; Uzbekistan	Chile; China; Germany; Great Britain; Italy; Ukraine	China; Germany; Great Britain; Hungary; Israel; Spain	France; Germany; Great Britain; Hungary; Poland; Spain	Australia; Brazil; Canada; Germany; Great Britain; India	Brazil; Canada; China; Great Britain; Ukraine; United States	60
2024 World Championships	9–11 May 2024	(Hungary) Szeged	Egypt; India; Italy; Spain	Brazil; Great Britain; Hungary; Serbia	Brazil; Senegal; South Korea; Uzbekistan	Canada; Great Britain; Iran; Italy	Brazil; China; Italy; New Zealand	Brazil; India; Japan	Egypt; India; Neutral Paralympic Athletes; Thailand	Australia; Iran; Italy; Uzbekistan	Italy; Japan; Neutral Paralympic Athletes; Uzbekistan	France; Kazakhstan; Poland; Uzbekistan	39
Host country allocation			—N/a										
													100

== Medal table ==
* Host nation (France)

Rank	NPC	Gold	Silver	Bronze	Total
1	Great Britain	4	4	0	8
2	Brazil	1	2	1	4
3	Australia	1	1	1	3
3	Ukraine	1	1	1	3
5	Algeria	1	0	0	1
5	Chile	1	0	0	1
5	Hungary	1	0	0	1
8	France*	0	1	1	2
9	Canada	0	1	0	1
10	Germany	0	0	3	3
11	China	0	0	1	1
11	New Zealand	0	0	1	1
11	United States	0	0	1	1
Totals (13 entries)		10	10	10	30

== Medalists ==
=== Men ===
Event	Class	Gold	Silver	Bronze
Kayak	KL1	Péter Pál Kiss; Hungary	Luis Cardoso da Silva; Brazil	Rémy Boullé; France
Kayak	KL2	Curtis McGrath; Australia	David Phillipson; Great Britain	Mykola Syniuk; Ukraine
Kayak	KL3	Brahim Guendouz; Algeria	Dylan Littlehales; Australia	Miquéias Elias Rodrigues; Brazil
Va'a	VL2	Fernando Rufino de Paulo; Brazil	Igor Tofalini; Brazil	Steven Haxton; United States
Va'a	VL3	Vladyslav Yepifanov; Ukraine	Jack Eyers; Great Britain	Peter Cowan; New Zealand

=== Women ===
Event	Class	Gold	Silver	Bronze
Kayak	KL1	Katherinne Wollermann; Chile	Maryna Mazhula; Ukraine	Edina Müller; Germany
Kayak	KL2	Charlotte Henshaw; Great Britain	Emma Wiggs; Great Britain	Anja Adler; Germany
Kayak	KL3	Laura Sugar; Great Britain	Nélia Barbosa; France	Felicia Laberer; Germany
Va'a	VL2	Emma Wiggs; Great Britain	Brianna Hennessy; Canada	Susan Seipel; Australia
Va'a	VL3	Charlotte Henshaw; Great Britain	Hope Gordon; Great Britain	Zhong Yongyuan; China

== See also ==
- Canoeing at the 2024 Summer Olympics
