= 2025 ICF Canoe Sprint World Championships – Men's KL2 =

Men's KL2 200 metres at the 2025 ICF Canoe Sprint World Championships
- Venue: Idroscalo Regatta Course
- Location: Milan, Italy
- Dates: 22–24 August
- Competitors: 22 from 18 nations
- Winning time: 44.04

Medalists
gold medal	David Phillipson	Great Britain
silver medal	Christian Volpi	Italy
bronze medal	Oybek Yuldashev	Uzbekistan

The men's KL2 competition at the 2025 ICF Canoe Sprint World Championships in Milan took place at Idroscalo Regatta Course.

== Schedule ==
The schedule is as follows:

Date	Time	Round
Friday 22 August 2025	08:15	Heats
Saturday 23 August 2025	09:00	Semifinal
Sunday 24 August 2025	09:50	Final B
Sunday 24 August 2025	10:22	Final A

== Results ==
=== Heats ===
The fastest boat in each heat advanced directly to the final (QF). The next six fastest boats in each heat advanced to the semifinal (QS).

==== Heat 1 ====
Rank	Canoeist	Country	Time	Notes
1	David Phillipson	Great Britain	44.22	FA
2	Tibor Kiss	Hungary	45.35	QS
3	Uilian Ferreira Mendes	Brazil	45.65	QS
4	Hiromi Tatsumi	Japan	52.68	QS
5	Jacob Carlsson	Sweden	55.91	QS
6	Giuseppe Cotticelli	Italy	59.20	QS
7	Michael Ballard	United States	59.90	QS
	On Youn-ho	South Korea	DNF	

==== Heat 2 ====
Rank	Canoeist	Country	Time	Notes
1	Scott Martlew	New Zealand	43.72	FA
2	Bibarys Spatay	Kazakhstan	44.95	QS
3	Oybek Yuldashev	Uzbekistan	45.19	QS
4	Flavio Reitz	Brazil	45.35	QS
5	Christian Volpi	Italy	45.77	QS
6	Emilio Ariel Atamanuk	Argentina	48.64	QS
7	Adi Ezra	Israel	48.80	QS

==== Heat 3 ====
Rank	Canoeist	Country	Time	Notes
1	Mykola Syniuk	Ukraine	43.69	FA
2	Azizbek Abdulkhabibov	Uzbekistan	44.11	QS
3	Franco Gutiérrez	Chile	46.21	QS
4	Luciano Pereira Lima	Brazil	50.47	QS
5	Chen Liangwen	China	52.29	QS
6	Sergei Ablakov	Individual Neutral Athletes	57.35	QS
	Mehdi Deghmache	France	DQB	

=== Semifinal ===
The fastest three boats in each semi advanced to the A final. The next four fastest boats in each semi and best 8th advanced to the final B.

==== Semifinal 1 ====
Rank	Canoeist	Country	Time	Notes
1	Azizbek Abdulkhabibov	Uzbekistan	44.28	FA
2	Oybek Yuldashev	Uzbekistan	44.91	FA
3	Flavio Reitz	Brazil	45.03	FA
4	Emilio Ariel Atamanuk	Argentina	45.48	FB
5	Uilian Ferreira Mendes	Brazil	45.81	FB
6	Luciano Pereira Lima	Brazil	50.08	FB
7	Jacob Carlsson	Sweden	55.00	FB
8	Giuseppe Cotticelli	Italy	58.52	

==== Semifinal 2 ====
Rank	Canoeist	Country	Time	Notes
1	Christian Volpi	Italy	45.07	FA
2	Bibarys Spatay	Kazakhstan	45.21	FA
3	Tibor Kiss	Hungary	45.52	FA
4	Franco Gutiérrez	Chile	46.56	FB
5	Adi Ezra	Israel	48.51	FB
6	Hiromi Tatsumi	Japan	52.47	FB
7	Chen Liangwen	China	52.77	FB
8	Michael Ballard	United States	57.87	fB
9	Sergei Ablakov	Individual Neutral Athletes	1:00.48	

=== Finals ===
==== Final B ====
Competitors in this final raced for positions 10 to 18.

Rank	Canoeist	Country	Time	Notes
1	Emilio Ariel Atamanuk	Argentina	46.12	
2	Uilian Ferreira Mendes	Brazil	46.55	
3	Franco Gutiérrez	Chile	47.08	
4	Adi Ezra	Israel	48.36	
5	Luciano Pereira Lima	Brazil	49.99	
6	Hiromi Tatsumi	Japan	51.25	
7	Chen Liangwen	China	54.74	
8	Jacob Carlsson	Sweden	57.19	
9	Michael Ballard	United States	57.33	

==== Final A ====
Competitors raced for positions 1 to 9, with medals going to the top three.

Rank	Canoeist	Country	Time	Notes
1st place, gold medalist(s)	David Phillipson	Great Britain	44.04	
2nd place, silver medalist(s)	Christian Volpi	Italy	44.21	
3rd place, bronze medalist(s)	Azizbek Abdulkhabibov	Uzbekistan	44.22	
4	Scott Martlew	New Zealand	44.28	
5	Mykola Syniuk	Ukraine	44.45	
6	Bibarys Spatay	Kazakhstan	45.06	
7	Oybek Yuldashev	Uzbekistan	45.81	
8	Tibor Kiss	Hungary	46.00	
9	Flavio Reitz	Brazil	46.40	
