= 2016 ICF Paracanoe World Championships – Men's VL1 =

Men's VL1 at the 2016 ICF Paracanoe World Championships
- Location: Duisburg, Germany
- Dates: 19 May
- Competitors: 5 from 5 nations
- Winning time: 56.539

Medalists
gold medal	Luis Cardoso da Silva	Brazil
silver medal	Róbert Suba	Hungary
bronze medal	Jakub Tokarz	Poland

The men's VL1 competition at the 2016 ICF Paracanoe World Championships took place in Duisburg.

== Schedule ==
The schedule was as follows:

Date	Time	Round
Thursday 19 May 2016	14:30	Final

All times are Central European Summer Time (UTC+2)

== Results ==
With fewer than ten competitors entered, this event was held as a direct final.

Rank	Name	Country	Time
1st place, gold medalist(s)	Luis Cardoso da Silva	Brazil	56.539
2nd place, silver medalist(s)	Róbert Suba	Hungary	58.718
3rd place, bronze medalist(s)	Jakub Tokarz	Poland	1:01.814
4	Pavel Gromov	Russia	1:04.856
5	Vadim Kin	United States	1:20.237
