= David Phillipson (canoeist) =

British paracanoeist (born 1989)

Personal information
- Nationality: British
- Born: 1 January 1989 (age 37) Huntingdon, U.K.

Sport
- Country: Great Britain
- Sport: Para canoe Wheelchair tennis
- Disability class: KL2
Medal record
Men's Para canoe
Representing Great Britain
Paralympic Games
Silver medal – second place	2024 Paris	KL2
World Championships
Gold medal – first place	2025 Milan	KL2
Silver medal – second place	2024 Szeged	KL2
European Championships
Gold medal – first place	2025 Racice	KL2

David Phillipson (born 1 January 1989) is a British Para canoeist and wheelchair tennis player.

== Career ==
Phillipson represented Great Britain in wheelchair tennis at the 2008, 2012 and 2016 Summer Paralympics. He switched to paracanoe for the 2020 Summer Paralympics.

Phillipson represented Great Britain at the 2024 Summer Paralympics in the men's KL2 event and won a silver medal.
