= Esteban Farias =

Italian canoeist (born 1984)

Personal information
- Full name: Esteban Gabriel Farias
- Nationality: Italian
- Born: 27 July 1984 (age 41) San Martín, Argentina

Sport
- Sport: Paracanoe
- Disability: Spinal cord injury
- Disability class: KL1
- Event: Canoe sprint
- Club: Canottieri Leonida Bissolati
Medal record
Men's paracanoeing
Representing Italy
Event	1st	2nd	3rd
World Championships	2	1	0
European Championships	2	3	1
Total	4	4	1
World Championships
Gold medal – first place	2017 Račice	KL1
Gold medal – first place	2018 Montemor-o-Velho	KL1
Silver medal – second place	2019 Szeged	KL1
European Championships
Gold medal – first place	2017 Plovdiv	KL1
Gold medal – first place	2018 Belgrade	KL1
Silver medal – second place	2019 Poznań	KL1
Silver medal – second place	2021 Poznań	KL1
Silver medal – second place	2022 Munich	KL1
Bronze medal – third place	2024 Szeged	KL1

Esteban Farias (born 27 July 1984) is an Argentinian-born Italian paracanoeist who won nine medals (four gold) at senior level between World Championships and European Championships.

== Biography ==
He lives in Fiorenzuola d'Arda, Piacenza but trains in Cremona. He acquired his disability in 2009 (Spinal cord injuries - lower 5), at the age of 25, when he was visiting his grandmother in Argentina, falling from a four-meter high wall.

Despite having qualified for the Tokyo 2020 Paralympic Games (however, which took place in 2021 due to COVID-19), he was forced to give up due to an injury.
