= Péter Pál Kiss =

Hungarian Para canoeist (born 2003)

Péter Kiss
Personal information
- Full name: Péter Pál Kiss
- Nationality: Hungarian
- Born: 6 May 2003 (age 23)

Sport
- Country: Hungary
- Sport: Para canoe
- Disability: Guillain–Barré syndrome
- Disability class: KL1
- Club: Budapesti Honvéd Sportegyesület
- Coached by: István Pruzsina
Medal record
Men's Para canoe
Representing Hungary
Event	1st	2nd	3rd
Paralympic Games	2	0	0
Sprint World Championships	6	0	0
Marathon World Championships	0	1	0
Sprint European Championships	5	0	0
Total	13	1	0
Paralympic Games
Gold medal – first place	2020 Tokyo	KL1
Gold medal – first place	2024 Paris	KL1
Sprint World Championships
Gold medal – first place	2019 Szeged	KL1
Gold medal – first place	2021 Copenhagen	KL1
Gold medal – first place	2022 Dartmouth	KL1
Gold medal – first place	2023 Duisburg	KL1
Gold medal – first place	2025 Milan	KL1
Gold medal – first place	2026 Poznán	KL1
Marathon World Championships
Silver medal – second place	2025 Győr	KL1
Sprint European Championships
Gold medal – first place	2019 Poznań	KL1
Gold medal – first place	2021 Poznań	KL1
Gold medal – first place	2022 Munich	KL1
Gold medal – first place	2025 Racice	KL1
Gold medal – first place	2026 Montemor-o-Velho	KL1

Péter Pál Kiss (born 6 May 2003) is a Hungarian Para canoeist. He represented Hungary at the 2020 and 2024 Summer Paralympics. At 18 years old he was youngest-ever paracanoe Paralympic champion.

== Early life ==
Kiss originally lived in a shanty town in Baranya County. In 2011, Kiss was paralyzed after being diagnosed with Guillain–Barré syndrome. When Kiss was eight, he thought it was a fever that was originally thought as just being the flu but as a result he lost feeling in his legs. In order to get treatment, he moved to a school in Budapest. As part of his rehabilitation, he started swimming despite a fear of water after a near drowning experience when he was younger and overcame that fear.

Whilst undergoing rehabilitation after losing the use of his legs, his swimming coach noticed Kiss demonstrating talent in a canoe and suggested he take it up. He started training on the River Danube and won gold and bronze medals at Hungary's national paracanoe championships. When he was 16, he won gold at the 2019 ICF Canoe Sprint World Championships.

== Career ==
At the 2020 Summer Paralympics in Tokyo, Japan, Kiss won gold in the 200 metre KL1 sprint. This made him the first teenager to win gold in the KL1 class. Prior to the 2024 Summer Paralympics in Paris, France, Kiss suffered a pectoral muscle injury in training that kept him out of the 2024 European and World Championships and only qualified for the Paralympics after winning a domestic head to head competition. Following a repeat gold medal win at the Paralympics, Kiss was selected as Hungary's co-flagbearer for the closing ceremony. Later in the year, Kiss announced that he was looking to enter in the VL2 category in addition to KL1. In 2025, he announced that he had a new coach and trained in the bay at Újpest on the Danube as a part of the Budapesti Honvéd SE canoeing team. On 11 January 2024, he was named the Hungarian parasportsman of the year for 2023.

In August 2025, he competed at the 2025 ICF Canoe Sprint World Championships and won a gold medal in the KL1 event. The next month he competed at the 2025 ICF Canoe Marathon World Championships and won a silver medal in the KL1 event with a time of 32:37.15. This marked the first time paracanoe was competed in marathon distances at the ICF Canoe Marathon World Championships.
