= Igor Alex Tofalini =

Brazilian Paracanoeist (born 1983)

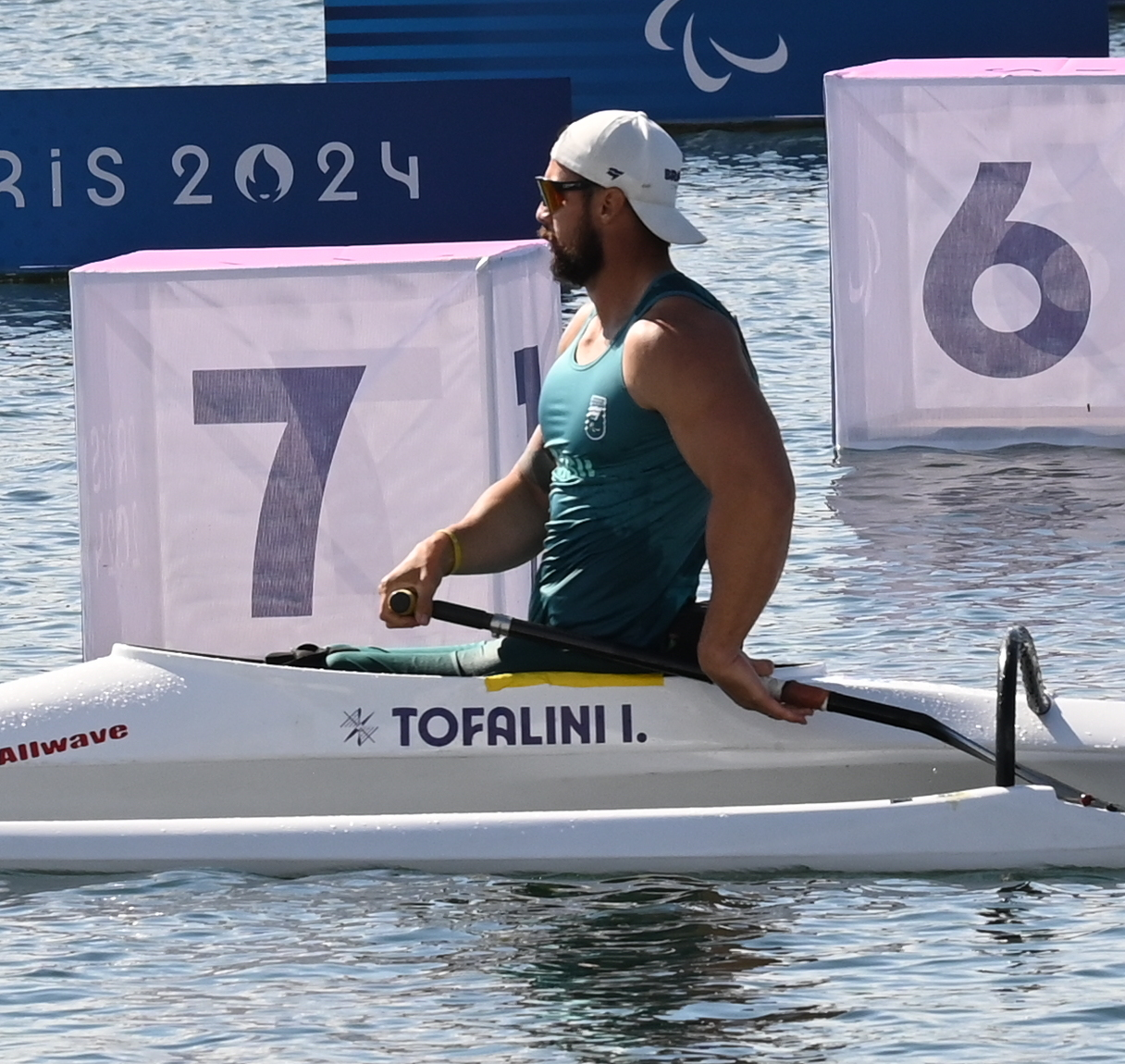
- Tofalini at the 2024 Summer Paralympics

Personal information
- Born: 12 April 1983 (age 43) Cambé, Paraná, Brazil

Sport
- Country: Brazil
- Sport: Para canoe
- Disability class: VL2
Medal record
Men's Para canoe
Representing Brazil
Paralympic Games
Silver medal – second place	2024 Paris	VL2
World Championships
Gold medal – first place	2018 Montemor-o-Velho	VL2
Gold medal – first place	2022 Dartmouth	VL2
Silver medal – second place	2023 Duisburg	VL2
Silver medal – second place	2024 Szeged	VL2
Silver medal – second place	2025 MIlan	VL2
Bronze medal – third place	2026 Poznán	VL2

Igor Alex Tofalini (born 12 April 1983) is a Brazilian Para canoeist. He represented Brazil at the 2016 and 2024 Summer Paralympics.

== Career ==
Tofalini represented Brazil at the 2024 Summer Paralympics in the men's VL2 event and won a silver medal.
