= Colin Sieders =

Australian paracanoeist (born 1982)

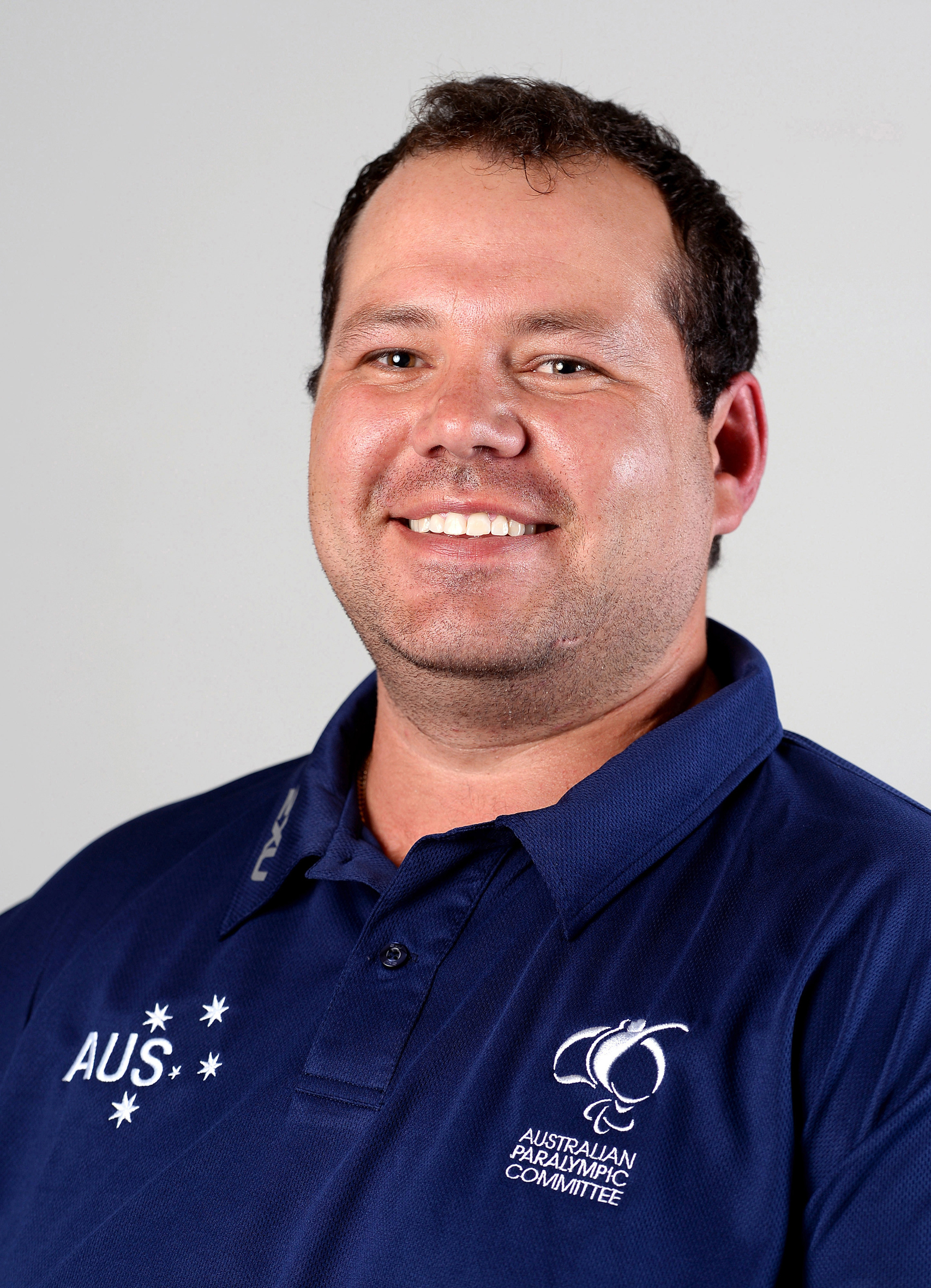
- 2016 Australian Paralympic team portrait

Personal information
- Nationality: Australia
- Born: 31 January 1982 (age 44) Blacktown, New South Wales
- Height: 176 cm (5 ft 9 in)

Sport
- Club: Penrith Valley Canoeing

Colin Sieders (born 19 January 1982) is an Australian paracanoeist and former racing driver. He competed for Australia at the 2016 Rio Paralympics.

== Personal ==
Sieders was born in Blacktown, New South Wales on 19 January 1982. In 1997, he was involved in a car accident on his way to soccer when the car he was travelling lost control on black ice and crashed into a pole. The driver of the car was killed. CareFlight responded to the accident and Sieders believes that they saved his life. He spent 88 days in intensive care, underwent 30 operations over 51 weeks in hospital. He was initially told he would never walk again. A second car accident in December 2011 resulted in him being back in a wheelchair and limited walking through the use of crutches . He took up paracanoe after the accident to improve his fitness and reduce weight gain. He said "It was developing into a serious problem so I looked around for something to do. It had to be a low-impact sport because of my injured hip. I'm a water-lover, so kayaking was the way to go".

Sieders helps run Sieders V8 RacingTeam with his brothers and helps promote CareFlight, who helped save his life. He lives in Yarramundi, New South Wales with his wife Erin and daughter Rosie and twins Violet and Phoenix. He works for his family business All-Trans Trucks.

== Sporting career ==
=== Motor racing ===
Sieders comes from a motor racing family. His father Bill, older brother Luke and younger brother David are racing drivers. Sieders has only 30 percent use of his left leg and requires a unique 'hand-clutch' in his Ford Falcon V8 Supercar. Sieders was the first permanently disabled driver to race in the Fujitsu V8 Supercar Development Series. In 2004, he took Pole Position at Sandown, and set a race lap record on the streets of Adelaide. He ceased racing after a car accident in 2011.

=== Paracanoe ===
Sieders is classified as a KL1 paracanoeist. He took up canoeing after he was no longer able to race V8 Supercars. His personal trainer Sam Norton, a former kayaker introduced him to Andrea King who was the Australian paracanoe coach. He took up paracanoeing in 2012.

==== International results ====
- 2013 – 7th K1 200 Final – 2013 ICF Canoe Sprint World Championships Duisburg
- 2014 – 6th K1 200 Final – 2014 ICF Canoe Sprint World Championships, Moscow
- 2015 – 9th KL1 200 Final – 2015 ICF Canoe Sprint World Championships Milan
- 2016 – 1st KL1 200 – Oceania Championships, Adelaide
- 2016 – 4th KL1 200 B Final – 2016 Paracanoe World Championships, Duisburg
- 2016 – 8th KL1 200 Final – 2016 Rio Paralympics

==== National results ====
- 2014 – 1st K1 200, K1 500m, K1 1000 – National Championship, Adelaide
- 2015 – 1st K1 200, K1 500m K1 1000 – National Championships, Sydney
- 2016 – 1st KL1 200 – National Championships, Perth, Western Australia
