= 2024 ICF Paracanoe World Championships =

International canoe competition

- Location: Szeged, Hungary
- Start date: 9 May
- End date: 11 May

The 2024 ICF Paracanoe World Championships were held in Szeged, Hungary from 9 to 11 May 2024. This event, which is part of the ICF Canoe Sprint World Championships in non-Paralympic years, took place as a standalone competition in order to accommodate athletes seeking to qualify for the 2024 Paralympic regatta. It shared the venue with, and was held concurrently with the 2024 European Canoe Sprint Qualifier and Szeged leg of the 2024 ICF Canoe Sprint World Cup.

== Explanation of events ==
Paracanoe competitions are contested in either a va'a (V), an outrigger canoe (which includes a second pontoon) with a single-blade paddle, or in a kayak (K), a closed canoe with a double-bladed paddle. All international competitions are held over 200 metres in single-man boats, with three event classes in both types of vessel for men and women depending on the level of an athlete's impairment. The lower the classification number, the more severe the impairment is - for example, VL1 is a va'a competition for those with particularly severe impairments.

== Paralympic qualification ==
In all canoe classes bar the VL1, the top four NPCs not already qualified after the 2023 ICF Canoe Sprint World Championships claimed quota slots for Paris 2024.

== Medal summary ==
=== Medal table ===
* Host nation (Hungary)

Rank	Nation	Gold	Silver	Bronze	Total
1	Great Britain	4	3	0	7
2	Brazil	2	2	2	6
3	Spain	2	0	0	2
4	Australia	1	1	2	4
5	Ukraine	1	1	0	2
6	Chile	1	0	1	2
7	Italy	1	0	0	1
8	France	0	1	1	2
9	Canada	0	1	0	1
9	Hungary*	0	1	0	1
9	India	0	1	0	1
9	New Zealand	0	1	0	1
13	Germany	0	0	2	2
14	Iran	0	0	1	1
14	Japan	0	0	1	1
14	United States	0	0	1	1
14	Uzbekistan	0	0	1	1
Totals (17 entries)		12	12	12	36

=== Medal events ===
Non-Paralympic classes

Event	Gold		Silver		Bronze	
Men's KL1	Luis Cardoso da Silva; Brazil	46.17	Rémy Boullé; France	46.63	Saeid Hosseinpour; Iran	48.42
Men's KL2	Curtis McGrath; Australia	42.89	David Phillipson; Great Britain	43.60	Fernando Rufino; Brazil	43.64
Men's KL3	Juan Valle; Spain	40.17	Dylan Littlehales; Australia	40.27	Miquéias Elias Rodrigues; Brazil	40.40
Men's VL1	David González; Spain	1:06.89	Carlos Glenndel Moreira; Brazil	1:07.15	Yuta Takagi; Japan	1:07.60
Men's VL2	Fernando Rufino; Brazil	50.59	Igor Tofalini; Brazil	51.20	Steven Haxton; United States	52.25
Men's VL3	Vladyslav Yepifanov; Ukraine	47.80	Peter Cowan; New Zealand	48.51	Curtis McGrath; Australia	48.99
Women's KL1	Katherinne Wollermann; Chile	52.83	Maryna Mazhula; Ukraine	53.13	Edina Müller; Germany	53.62
Women's KL2	Charlotte Henshaw; Great Britain	48.79	Katalin Varga; Hungary	50.89	Anja Adler; Germany	52.64
Women's KL3	Laura Sugar; Great Britain	45.97	Hope Gordon; Great Britain	46.94	Nélia Barbosa; France	47.15
Women's VL1	Viktoryia Shablova; Italy	1:19.15	Pooja Ojha; India	1:24.51	Jocelyn Muñoz; Chile	1:26.06
Women's VL2	Emma Wiggs; Great Britain	58.69	Brianna Hennessy; Canada	1:00.35	Susan Seipel; Australia	1:02.15
Women's VL3	Charlotte Henshaw; Great Britain	56.80	Hope Gordon; Great Britain	56.91	Shakhzoda Mamadalieva; Uzbekistan	58.22
