= Steven Haxton =

American Para canoeist (born 1990)

Personal information
- Full name: Steven Blake Haxton
- Born: December 17, 1990 (age 35) Columbus, Ohio, U.S.

Sport
- Country: United States
- Sport: Para rowing Para canoe
- Disability class: VL2
Medal record
Men's Para canoe
Representing United States
Paralympic Games
Silver medal – second place	2020 Tokyo	VL2
Bronze medal – third place	2024 Paris	VL2
World Championships
Gold medal – first place	2026 Poznán	VL2
Bronze medal – third place	2023 Duisburg	VL2
Bronze medal – third place	2024 Szeged	VL2

Steven Blake Haxton (born December 17, 1990) is an American Para rower and Para canoeist. He is a three-time Paralympian.

== Career ==
Haxton represented the United States at the 2016 Summer Paralympics in the men's single sculls and finished in fourth place with a time of 4:54.25.

Haxton represented the United States at the 2020 Summer Paralympics in the men's VL2 event and won a silver medal.
