= Luis Cardoso da Silva =

Brazilian Para canoeist (born 1984)

Luís Cardoso da Silva
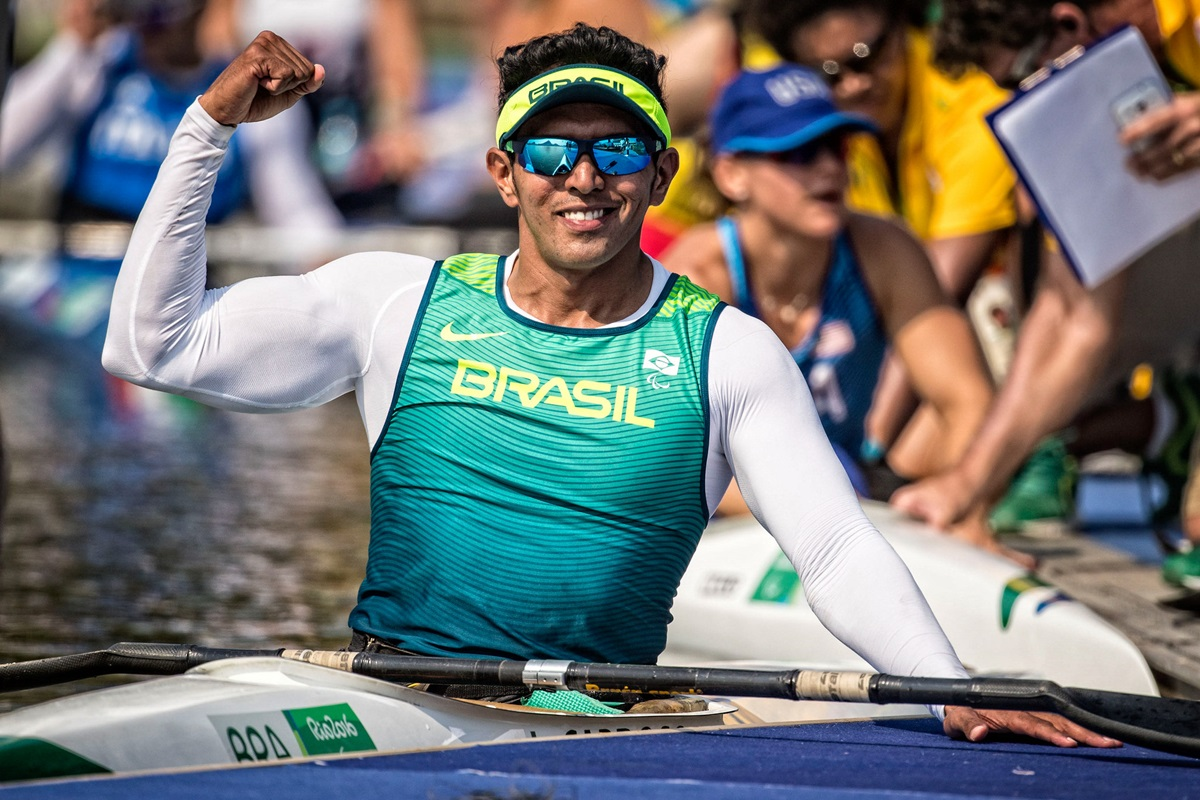
- Cardoso in 2016

Personal information
- Full name: Luís Carlos Cardoso da Silva
- Born: 11 December 1984 (age 41) Picos, Piauí, Brazil

Sport
- Country: Brazil
- Sport: Para canoe
- Disability class: KL1, VL2
Medal record
Men's Para canoe
Representing Brazil
Event	1st	2nd	3rd
Paralympic Games	0	2	0
World Championships	7	6	5
Total	7	8	5
Paralympic Games
Silver medal – second place	2020 Tokyo	KL1
Silver medal – second place	2024 Paris	KL1
World Championships
Gold medal – first place	2014 Moscow	V–1 A
Gold medal – first place	2015 Milan	KL1
Gold medal – first place	2015 Milan	VL1
Gold medal – first place	2016 Duisburg	VL1
Gold medal – first place	2017 Račice	VL1
Gold medal – first place	2019 Szeged	VL2
Gold medal – first place	2024 Szeged	KL1
Silver medal – second place	2012 Poznań	V–1 A
Silver medal – second place	2018 Montemor-o-Velho	VL2
Silver medal – second place	2021 Copenhagen	KL1
Silver medal – second place	2022 Dartmouth	KL1
Silver medal – second place	2025 Milan	KL1
Silver medal – second place	2026 Poznán	KL1
Bronze medal – third place	2016 Duisburg	KL1
Bronze medal – third place	2017 Račice	KL1
Bronze medal – third place	2018 Montemor-o-Velho	KL1
Bronze medal – third place	2019 Szeged	KL1
Bronze medal – third place	2023 Duisburg	KL1

Luís Carlos Cardoso da Silva (born 11 December 1984) is a Brazilian Para canoeist. He is a seven-time world champion.

== Career ==
Silva won his fifth world championship in 2017 in the men's VL1 event, surpassing Fernando Fernandes de Pádua for the most by a Brazilian.

Silva represented Brazil at the 2016 Summer Paralympics in the men's KL1 event and finished in fourth place with a time 51.631. He again represented Brazil at the 2020 Summer Paralympics in the men's KL1 event and finished with a time of 48.031 and won a silver medal.
