= Miroslav Šperk =

Czech Paralympic athlete

Personal information
- Born: 10 October 1984 (age 41) Jičín
Medal record
Paralympic athletics
Representing Czech Republic
Paralympic Games
Silver medal – second place	2004 Athens	Discus Throw - F56

Miroslav Šperk (born 10 October 1984 in Jičín) is a Paralympic athlete from the Czech Republic, competing mainly in category F56 Discus events.

== Biography ==
Miroslav competed in shotput and discus at the 2004 Summer Paralympics, winning silver in the discus throw. Four years later at the 2008 Summer Paralympics in Beijing, Miroslav made 5th place in the discus throw.
