= Anas Al Khalifa =

Syrian paracanoeist (born 1993)

Personal information
- Born: 1993 (age 32–33) Hama, Syria

Sport
- Sport: Paracanoe
- Disability class: KL1, VL2
- Club: SV Halle Para Kanu
- Coached by: Ognyana Dusheva

Achievements and titles
- Paralympic finals: 2020
- World finals: 2021

Anas Al Khalifa (born 1993) is a Syrian paracanoeist, who competed for the Refugee Paralympic Team at the 2020 Summer Paralympics. Born in Syria, he now lives in Germany.

== Personal life ==
Al Khalifa was born in 1993, in Hama. He fled the country due to the Syrian civil war. He lived in an internment camp for two years, before fleeing to Turkey in 2014. He later travelled through Greece, and in August 2015, Al Khalifa arrived in Germany, where he got a job installing solar panels. He has lived in Halle.

In 2018, Al Khalifa broke his back in a workplace accident, and became reliant on a wheelchair. His brother was killed in Syria in 2020.

== Career ==
Al Khalifa is coached by former Olympian Ognyana Dusheva, and trains at SV Halle Para Kanu. He started training in 2019 in an indoor swimming pool. In April 2021, he failed to qualify for the German paracanoe team for the delayed 2020 Summer Paralympics. In May 2021, he competed at the Paracanoe World Cup event in Szeged, Hungary, and later in the year he also competed at the 2021 Canoe Sprint European Championships, where he beat his personal best time by over five seconds.

In June 2021, Al Khalifa was announced in the Refugee Paralympic Team at the 2020 Summer Paralympics. He competed in the KL1 and VL2 events, finishing sixth in the heats of both events. He finished ninth overall in the KL1 event and was fifth and last in his VL2 semi-final. Later in the year, Al Khalifa came fifth in the KL1 event at the 2021 ICF Canoe Sprint World Championships. He competed for Germany at the championships.
