= Eslam Jahedi =

Iranian canoeist

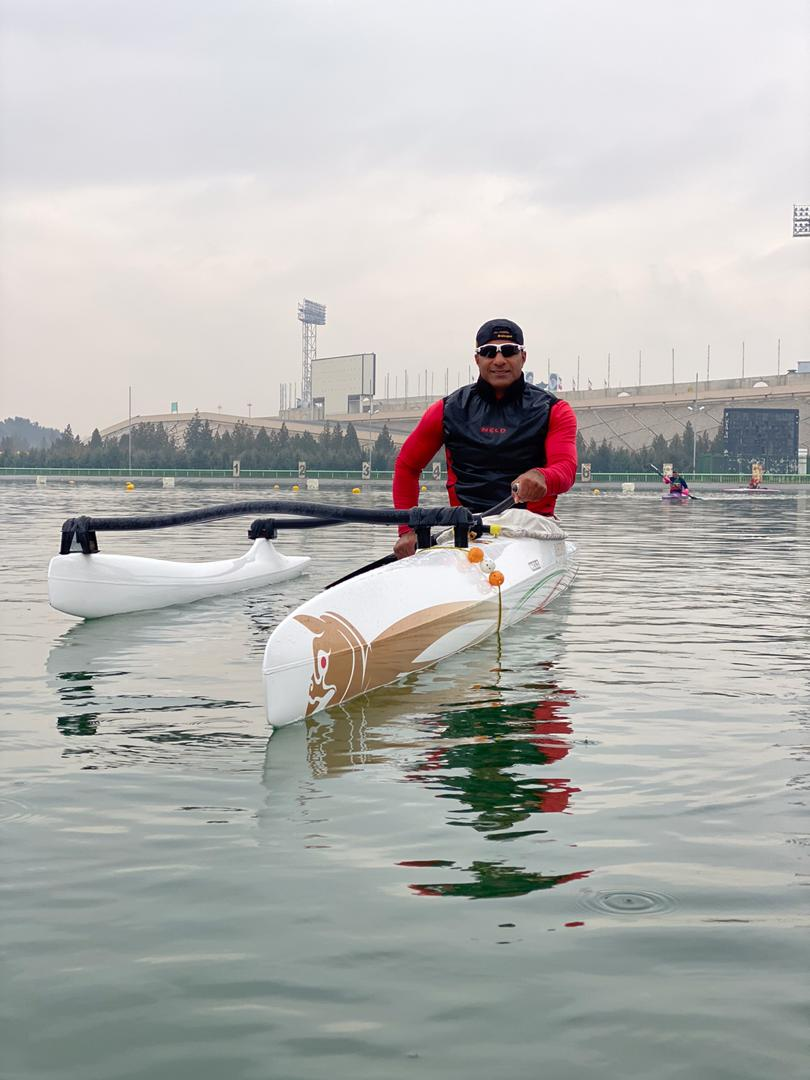

Personal information
- Nationality: Iranian
- Born: 1 January 1979 (age 47) Bandar Abbas, Iran
- Height: 176 cm (5 ft 9 in)
- Weight: 65 kg (143 lb)

Sport
- Country: Iran
- Sport: Men's paracanoe
Medal record
Asian Championships
Bronze medal – third place	2016 Uzbekistan	KL2 200 m
Silver medal – second place	2017 Thailand	KL2 200 m
Bronze medal – third place	2017 Thailand	VL2 200 m
Gold medal – first place	2018 Uzbekistan	VL2 200 m
Asian Para Games
Gold medal – first place	2022 Hangzhou	VL2 200m

Eslam Jahedi (born 1 January 1979) is an Iranian paracanoeist who is a member of the Iranian national team.

== About ==
At the age of 9 months, Jahedi suffered from a complication of the left leg and a small part of his right leg. However, he was very interested in sports since childhood. In 1991, he officially became a member of the Hormozgan Province Wheelchair Basketball Team, and after 6 years, he was called to the camp of the senior national team as the youngest wheelchair basketball player in the country. Jahedi was one of the few athletes who participated as a legionnaire in the clubs of other provinces and to this day, as the captain of the Hormozgan province wheelchair basketball team, he has been active in the field of basketball professionally by winning dozens of different titles in championships and clubs. Continues.

In the same years, he started the track and field for the disabled in sprint and wheelchair throwing events, and in the country's youth championships he won a silver medal in javelin throw, a 100-meter gold medal and a 400-meter silver medal in wheelchair racing events.

Jahedi turned to para canoe in 2011. He won first place in the national championship and national team selection that year and became a member of the national team. He has been able to win all the national championships to date.

From 2014 to 2019, he participated in all the World and Asian Championships.

In 2016, Jahedi took part in the Paralympic Qualifiers in Duisburg, he won the second place in the final B (11th in the world And failed to become a member of the top ten in the world and qualify for the 2016 Summer Paralympics. He has won various titles in all Asian Championships.

In 2019, he competed in the 2019 ICF Canoe Sprint World Championships in Szeged, Hungary and the 2020 Paralympic Games Qualifiers in both kayak and canoe, and was able to win a continental quota. He also competed at the 2021 ICF Canoe Sprint World Championships in Copenhagen, Denmark.

He holds equivalent a Ph.D. in Sports Management
