= Norberto Mourão =

Portuguese Para canoeist (born 1980)

Personal information
- Born: 29 October 1980 (age 45) Vila Real, Portugal

Sport
- Country: Portugal
- Sport: Para canoe
- Disability class: VL2
- Coached by: Ivo Quendera
Medal record
Men's Para canoe
Representing Portugal
Paralympic Games
| Bronze medal – third place | 2020 Tokyo | VL2 |
Sprint World Championships
| Silver medal – second place | 2019 Szeged | VL2 |
| Bronze medal – third place | 2021 Copenhagen | VL2 |
| Bronze medal – third place | 2022 Dartmouth | VL2 |
Spritn European Championships
| Gold medal – first place | 2021 Poznań | VL2 |
| Gold medal – first place | 2024 Szeged | VL2 |
| Gold medal – first place | 2025 Racice | VL2 |
| Gold medal – first place | 2026 Montemor-o-Velho | VL2 |
| Bronze medal – third place | 2019 Poznań | VL2 |
| Bronze medal – third place | 2022 Munich | VL2 |
Marathon European Championships
| Gold medal – first place | 2025 Ponte de Lima | VL2 |
| Silver medal – second place | 2025 Ponte de Lima | KL2 |

Norberto Mourão (born 29 October 1980) is a Portuguese Para canoeist. He represented Portugal at the 2020 Summer Paralympics.

== Career ==
In May 2019, Mourão competed at the 2019 Paracanoe European Championships in the men's VL2 and won a bronze medal. In August 2019, he competed at the 2019 ICF Canoe Sprint World Championships in the men's VL2 event and won a silver medal.

Mourão represented Portugal at the 2020 Summer Paralympics in the men's VL2 event and won a bronze medal.
