= Jakub Tokarz =

Polish Para canoeist (born 1981)

Personal information
- Nationality: Polish
- Born: 14 October 1981 (age 44)
- Height: 178 cm (5 ft 10 in)
- Weight: 78 kg (172 lb)

Sport
- Country: Poland
- Sport: Para canoe
- Disability class: KL1
Medal record
Men's Para canoe
Representing Poland
Paralympic Games
Gold medal – first place	2016 Rio de Janeiro	KL1
World Championships
Silver medal – second place	2012 Poznań	K-1 A
Silver medal – second place	2013 Duisburg	V-1 A
Silver medal – second place	2015 Milan	KL1
Silver medal – second place	2015 Milan	VL1
Silver medal – second place	2016 Duisburg	KL1
Bronze medal – third place	2012 Poznań	V-1 A
Bronze medal – third place	2016 Duisburg	VL1
Bronze medal – third place	2019 Szeged	VL2

Jakub Tokarz (born 14 October 1981) is a Polish Para canoeist. He gold medalled at the 2016 Summer Paralympics in the Men's KL1.
