= Ian Marsden =

British Para canoeist, hand cyclist, and powerlifter (born 1972)

Personal information
- Full name: Ian James Marsden
- Born: 25 January 1972 (age 54) Stafford, England
- Height: 170 cm (5 ft 7 in)
- Weight: 68 kg (150 lb)

Sport
- Country: Great Britain
- Sport: Para canoe
- Disability class: KL1
- Club: Trentham Canoe Club
- Coached by: Colin Radmore
Medal record
Men's Para canoe
Representing Great Britain
Paralympic Games
Bronze medal – third place	2016 Rio de Janeiro	KL1
World Championships
Silver medal – second place	2013 Duisburg	K-1 A
Silver medal – second place	2014 Moscow	K-1 A
European Championships
Silver medal – second place	2013 Montemor-o-Velho	K-1 A
Gold medal – first place	2014 Brandenburg	K-1 A
Gold medal – first place	2015 Račice	K-1 A
Silver medal – second place	2017 Plovdiv	K-1 A
Bronze medal – third place	2019 Poznań	KL1

Ian James Marsden (born 25 January 1972 in Stafford) is a British Para canoeist, hand cyclist and former champion powerlifter. He won a bronze medal at the 2016 Summer Paralympics in the Men's KL1 200m.

== Personal life ==
Marsden began his professional life as a microbiologist.

== Sporting career ==
=== Powerlifting ===
Before sustaining a spinal injury, Marsden competed as a non-disabled athlete at the British Open Powerlifting Championships, and titled in 1989 when he was 17. He holds 3 world records.

=== Handcycling ===
After the spinal injury, he became the "first British male to win a podium position" on the European Handcycling Circuit (EHC).

=== Shooting ===
In the 10m air rifle category, Marsden won a silver and bronze medal at world level. He was due to compete in London 2012, but health complications prevented this.

=== Paracanoe ===
Marsden has mentioned that he was asked numerous times if he wanted to try Paracanoe (during his handcycling career and shooting). He took up the offer of regular training at Nottingham and joined the Paracanoe GB Sprint Team, representing Team Great Britain since 2013. He won a bronze medal at the Rio 2016 Paralympic Games.

== Injury ==
Marsden sustained a spinal injury powerlifting, which caused his hospitalisation and eventually introducing him to the world of handcycling. However, after competing on the European circuit for a number of years, Marsden was once again hospitalised, and it was discovered that he had a rare motor neuron condition.
