= Rémy Boullé =

French Para canoeist (born 1988)

Personal information
- Nationality: French
- Born: 20 June 1988 (age 38)

Sport
- Country: France
- Sport: Para canoe
- Disability class: KL1
- Club: CKC Orleans
- Coached by: Eric Le Leuch
Medal record
Men's Para canoe
Representing France
Paralympic Games
| Bronze medal – third place | 2020 Tokyo | KL1 |
| Bronze medal – third place | 2024 Paris | KL1 |
World Championships
| Silver medal – second place | 2023 Duisburg | KL1 |
| Silver medal – second place | 2024 Szeged | KL1 |
| Bronze medal – third place | 2022 Dartmouth | KL1 |
European Championships
| Gold medal – first place | 2024 Szeged | KL1 |
| Silver medal – second place | 2016 Moscow | KL1 |
| Silver medal – second place | 2025 Racice | KL1 |
| Bronze medal – third place | 2022 Munich | KL1 |
| Bronze medal – third place | 2026 Montemor-o-Velho | KL1 |

Rémy Boullé (born 20 June 1988) is a French Para canoeist. He represented France at the Summer Paralympics, and is a two-time bronze medalist.

== Career ==
Barbosa represented France at the 2016 Summer Paralympics in the men's KL1 event. and finished in fifth place with a time of 52.084.

Boullé again represented France at the 2020 Summer Paralympics in the men's KL1 event and finished with a time of 48.917 and won a bronze medal.
