= Róbert Suba =

Hungarian Para canoeist (born 1980)

Personal information
- Born: 17 July 1980 (age 46) Kiskunhalas, Hungary

Sport
- Country: Hungary
- Sport: Para canoe
- Disability class: KL1
Medal record
Men's Para canoe
Representing Hungary
Paralympic Games
Silver medal – second place	2016 Rio de Janeiro	KL1
Sprint World Championships
Silver medal – second place	2016 Duisburg	VL1
Silver medal – second place	2017 Račice	KL1
Silver medal – second place	2017 Račice	VL1
Silver medal – second place	2018 Montemor-o-Velho	KL1
Bronze medal – third place	2014 Moscow	V-1 A
Bronze medal – third place	2015 Milan	VL1
Bronze medal – third place	2021 Copenhagen	KL1
Sprint European Championships
Gold medal – first place	2015 Račice	VL1
Gold medal – first place	2016 Moscow	KL1
Gold medal – first place	2016 Moscow	VL1
Gold medal – first place	2017 Plovdiv	VL1
Silver medal – second place	2018 Belgrade	KL1
Silver medal – second place	2024 Szeged	KL1
Silver medal – second place	2026 Montemor-o-Velho	KL1
Bronze medal – third place	2017 Plovdiv	KL1
Bronze medal – third place	2021 Poznań	KL1
Bronze medal – third place	2021 Poznań	VL2
Bronze medal – third place	2024 Szeged	VL2
Bronze medal – third place	2025 Racice	KL1
Marathon World Championships
Gold medal – first place	2025 Győr	KL1

Róbert Suba (born 17 July 1980) is a Hungarian Para canoeist. He won a silver medal at the 2016 Summer Paralympics in the Men's KL1, and has also won several medals from 2014 to 2018 at the World Championships in the KL1 and/or VL1 classes.
