= Canoe at the 2016 Summer Paralympics – Men's KL2 =

Men's KL2 at the XV Paralympic Games
- Venue: Lagoa Rodrigo de Freitas
- Dates: 14–15 September 2016
- Competitors: 10 from 10 nations

Medalists
1st place, gold medalist(s)		Curtis McGrath	Australia
2nd place, silver medalist(s)		Markus Swoboda	Austria
3rd place, bronze medalist(s)		Nick Beighton	Great Britain

The Canoe Sprint men's KL2 event at the 2016 Paralympic Games took place on 14 and 15 September 2016, at the Lagoa Rodrigo de Freitas. Two heats were held. Winners and runners up advanced directly to the final. The rest went into the semifinal, where the top four advanced to the final.

== Heats ==
=== Heat 1 ===
9:30 14 September 2016:

Rank	Lane	Name	Nationality	Time	Notes
1	6	Curtis McGrath	Australia	44.104	F
2	5	Mykola Syniuk	Ukraine	47.307	F
3	7	Dejan Fabčič	Slovenia	48.131	SF
4	4	Ivo Kilian	Germany	50.222	SF
5	8	Javier Reja Muñoz	Spain	52.325	SF

=== Heat 2 ===
9:35 14 September 2016:

Rank	Lane	Name	Nationality	Time	Notes
1	6	Markus Swoboda	Austria	44.525	F
2	5	Nick Beighton	Great Britain	45.970	F
3	7	Federico Mancarella	Italy	47.300	SF
4	8	András Rozbora	Hungary	49.051	SF
5	4	Igor Alex Tofalini	Brazil	49.745	SF

== Semifinal ==
10:36 14 September 2016:

Rank	Lane	Name	Nationality	Time	Notes
1	3	Federico Mancarella	Italy	47.408	F
2	4	Dejan Fabčič	Slovenia	48.633	F
3	5	András Rozbora	Hungary	49.647	F
4	6	Ivo Kilian	Germany	49.737	F
5	7	Igor Alex Tofalini	Brazil	49.870	
6	8	Javier Reja Muñoz	Spain	52.389	

== Final ==
9:34 15 September 2016:

Rank	Lane	Name	Nationality	Time	Notes
1st place, gold medalist(s)	5	Curtis McGrath	Australia	42.190	
2nd place, silver medalist(s)	4	Markus Swoboda	Austria	43.726	
3rd place, bronze medalist(s)	6	Nick Beighton	Great Britain	44.936	
4	3	Mykola Syniuk	Ukraine	45.349	
5	2	Federico Mancarella	Italy	45.596	
6	7	Dejan Fabčič	Slovenia	47.420	
7	1	András Rozbora	Hungary	47.893	
8	8	Ivo Kilian	Germany	48.622	
