= 2016 ICF Paracanoe World Championships – Men's KL2 =

Men's KL2 at the 2016 ICF Paracanoe World Championships
- Location: Duisburg, Germany
- Dates: 17–19 May
- Competitors: 22 from 20 nations
- Winning time: 42.043

Medalists
gold medal	Curtis McGrath	Australia
silver medal	Markus Swoboda	Austria
bronze medal	Nick Beighton	Great Britain

The men's KL2 competition at the 2016 ICF Paracanoe World Championships took place in Duisburg.

== Schedule ==
The schedule was as follows:

Date	Time	Round
Tuesday 17 May 2016	14:30	Heats
Wednesday 18 May 2016	11:05	Semifinals
Thursday 19 May 2016	11:00	Final B
Thursday 19 May 2016	11:05	Final A

All times are Central European Summer Time (UTC+2)

== Results ==
=== Heats ===
Heat winners advanced directly to the A final. The next six fastest boats in each heat advanced to the semifinals.

==== Heat 1 ====
Rank	Name	Country	Time	Notes
1	Markus Swoboda	Austria	43.156	QA
2	Dejan Fabčič	Slovenia	46.688	QS
3	Federico Mancarella	Italy	47.712	QS
4	Ivo Kilian	Germany	49.158	QS
5	Norberto Mourão	Portugal	50.545	QS
6	Marius Bogdan Ciustea	Italy	51.335	QS
7	Aaron Paulson	United States	1:12.351	QS
8	Jin Yongwen	China	1:20.482	

==== Heat 2 ====
Rank	Name	Country	Time	Notes
1	Curtis McGrath	Australia	44.852	QA
2	Mykola Syniuk	Ukraine	46.705	QS
3	András Rozbora	Hungary	47.856	QS
4	Javier Reja Muñoz	Spain	48.390	QS
5	Or Adato	Israel	50.440	QS
6	Robert Studzizba	Poland	51.646	QS
7	Joni Tophuria	Georgia	1:10.740	QS

==== Heat 3 ====
Rank	Name	Country	Time	Notes
1	Nick Beighton	Great Britain	45.222	QA
2	Eddie Montañez	Puerto Rico	49.240	QS
3	Vuk Radovanović	Serbia	51.475	QS
4	Eslam Jahedi	Iran	51.553	QS
5	Igor Alex Tofalini	Brazil	51.626	QS
6	Filip Silvstrand Olsson	Sweden	53.584	QS
7	Danzig Norberg	United States	1:04.110	QS

=== Semifinals ===
The fastest three boats in each semi advanced to the A final.
The next four fastest boats in each semi, plus the fastest remaining boat advanced to the B final.

==== Semifinal 1 ====
Rank	Name	Country	Time	Notes
1	Federico Mancarella	Italy	45.670	QA
2	András Rozbora	Hungary	47.271	QA
3	Javier Reja Muñoz	Spain	47.354	QA
4	Eddie Montañez	Puerto Rico	47.952	QB
5	Eslam Jahedi	Iran	48.934	QB
6	Norberto Mourão	Portugal	48.983	QB
7	Marius Bogdan Ciustea	Italy	50.356	QB
8	Robert Studzizba	Poland	50.625	qB
9	Danzig Norberg	United States	57.959	

==== Semifinal 2 ====
Rank	Name	Country	Time	Notes
1	Dejan Fabčič	Slovenia	45.264	QA
2	Mykola Syniuk	Ukraine	45.382	QA
3	Ivo Kilian	Germany	47.150	QA
4	Igor Alex Tofalini	Brazil	47.980	QB
5	Vuk Radovanović	Serbia	48.411	QB
6	Or Adato	Israel	48.463	QB
7	Filip Silvstrand Olsson	Sweden	51.971	QB
8	Joni Tophuria	Georgia	1:07.850	
9	Aaron Paulson	United States	1:08.389	

=== Finals ===
==== Final B ====
Competitors in this final raced for positions 10 to 18.

Rank	Name	Country	Time
1	Eddie Montañez	Puerto Rico	49.400
2	Eslam Jahedi	Iran	50.516
3	Norberto Mourão	Portugal	50.537
4	Vuk Radovanović	Serbia	50.557
5	Igor Alex Tofalini	Brazil	50.597
6	Or Adato	Israel	51.012
7	Marius Bogdan Ciustea	Italy	51.831
8	Robert Studzizba	Poland	51.942
9	Filip Silvstrand Olsson	Sweden	53.088

==== Final A ====
Competitors in this final raced for positions 1 to 9, with medals going to the top three.

Rank	Name	Country	Time
1st place, gold medalist(s)	Curtis McGrath	Australia	42.043
2nd place, silver medalist(s)	Markus Swoboda	Austria	43.068
3rd place, bronze medalist(s)	Nick Beighton	Great Britain	44.572
4	Mykola Syniuk	Ukraine	46.493
5	Dejan Fabčič	Slovenia	46.625
6	Federico Mancarella	Italy	46.844
7	András Rozbora	Hungary	48.404
8	Javier Reja Muñoz	Spain	48.626
9	Ivo Kilian	Germany	48.891
