= 2019 ICF Canoe Sprint World Championships – Men's KL2 =

Men's KL2 at the 2019 ICF Canoe Sprint World Championships
- Venue: Olympic Centre of Szeged
- Location: Szeged, Hungary
- Dates: 21–24 August
- Competitors: 30 from 27 nations
- Winning time: 42.35

Medalists
gold medal	Curtis McGrath	Australia
silver medal	Federico Mancarella	Italy
bronze medal	Scott Martlew	New Zealand

The men's KL2 competition at the 2019 ICF Canoe Sprint World Championships in Szeged took place at the Olympic Centre of Szeged.

== Schedule ==
The schedule was as follows:

Date	Time	Round
Wednesday 21 August 2019	09:10	Heats
Wednesday 21 August 2019	12:20	Semifinals
Saturday 24 August 2019	10:05	Final B
Saturday 24 August 2019	10:15	Final A

All times are Central European Summer Time (UTC+2)

== Results ==
=== Heats ===
The six fastest boats in each heat, plus the three fastest seventh-place boats advanced to the semifinals.

==== Heat 1 ====
Rank	Name	Country	Time	Notes
1	Curtis McGrath	Australia	41.32	QS
2	Azizbek Abdulkhabibov	Uzbekistan	43.43	QS
3	Ivo Kilian	Germany	44.10	QS
4	Shi Wei	China	47.69	QS
5	On Younho	South Korea	51.59	QS
6	Csaba Rescsik	Hungary	54.02	QS
7	Ahmed Naguib	Egypt	56.41	qS
8	Swaleh Yunus	Kenya	1:11.65	

==== Heat 2 ====
Rank	Name	Country	Time	Notes
1	Scott Martlew	New Zealand	41.66	QS
2	Fernando Rufino de Paulo	Brazil	42.79	QS
3	David Phillipson	Great Britain	43.40	QS
4	Bibarys Spatay	Kazakhstan	46.19	QS
5	Emilio Atamañuk	Argentina	46.64	QS
6	Eslam Jahedi	Iran	47.67	QS
7	András Rozbora	Hungary	48.28	qS
8	Avadhesh Avadhesh	India	1:04.88	

==== Heat 3 ====
Rank	Name	Country	Time	Notes
1	Federico Mancarella	Italy	42.46	QS
2	Markus Swoboda	Austria	44.48	QS
3	Trinity Tratch	Canada	46.11	QS
4	Dejan Fabčič	Slovenia	48.77	QS
5	Hugo Costa	Portugal	49.06	QS
6	Jorge Enrique Moreno	Colombia	49.16	QS
7	Yury Samanenka	Belarus	55.01	qS

==== Heat 4 ====
Rank	Name	Country	Time	Notes
1	Mykola Syniuk	Ukraine	42.84	QS
2	Nick Beighton	Great Britain	43.72	QS
3	Vuk Radovanović	Serbia	48.07	QS
4	Robert Studzizba	Poland	48.90	QS
5	Higinio Rivero	Spain	57.60	QS
6	Luis Cabral	Angola	1:00.37	QS
7	Andrei Tkachuk	Belarus	1:14.31	

=== Semifinals ===
Qualification in each semi was as follows:

The fastest three boats advanced to the A final.
The next three fastest boats advanced to the B final.

==== Semifinal 1 ====
Rank	Name	Country	Time	Notes
1	Curtis McGrath	Australia	42.05	QA
2	Fernando Rufino de Paulo	Brazil	43.60	QA
3	Markus Swoboda	Austria	44.66	QA
4	András Rozbora	Hungary	49.08	QB
5	Eslam Jahedi	Iran	49.10	QB
6	Hugo Costa	Portugal	49.48	QB
7	Robert Studzizba	Poland	50.48	
8	Vuk Radovanović	Serbia	50.87	
9	On Younho	South Korea	52.74	

==== Semifinal 2 ====
Rank	Name	Country	Time	Notes
1	Scott Martlew	New Zealand	42.90	QA
2	Nick Beighton	Great Britain	44.65	QA
3	Ivo Kilian	Germany	44.68	QA
4	Trinity Tratch	Canada	46.80	QB
5	Emilio Atamañuk	Argentina	47.43	QB
6	Shi Wei	China	48.35	QB
7	Dejan Fabčič	Slovenia	49.51	
8	Yury Samanenka	Belarus	56.23	
9	Luis Cabral	Angola	1:14.96	

==== Semifinal 3 ====
Rank	Name	Country	Time	Notes
1	Federico Mancarella	Italy	41.66	QA
2	Mykola Syniuk	Ukraine	42.48	QA
3	Azizbek Abdulkhabibov	Uzbekistan	42.68	QA
4	David Phillipson	Great Britain	43.07	QB
5	Bibarys Spatay	Kazakhstan	45.94	QB
6	Jorge Enrique Moreno	Colombia	48.88	QB
7	Higinio Rivero	Spain	51.20	
8	Csaba Rescsik	Hungary	53.96	
9	Ahmed Naguib	Egypt	55.25	

=== Finals ===
==== Final B ====
Competitors in this final raced for positions 10 to 18.

Rank	Name	Country	Time
1	David Phillipson	Great Britain	44.36
2	Trinity Tratch	Canada	46.90
3	Bibarys Spatay	Kazakhstan	47.41
4	Shi Wei	China	48.53
5	Emilio Atamañuk	Argentina	48.59
6	András Rozbora	Hungary	48.90
7	Eslam Jahedi	Iran	49.54
8	Hugo Costa	Portugal	49.58
9	Jorge Enrique Moreno	Colombia	50.18

==== Final A ====
Competitors raced for positions 1 to 9, with medals going to the top three.

Rank	Name	Country	Time
1st place, gold medalist(s)	Curtis McGrath	Australia	42.35
2nd place, silver medalist(s)	Federico Mancarella	Italy	42.80
3rd place, bronze medalist(s)	Scott Martlew	New Zealand	43.51
4	Mykola Syniuk	Ukraine	43.77
4	Azizbek Abdulkhabibov	Uzbekistan	43.77
6	Fernando Rufino de Paulo	Brazil	44.33
7	Markus Swoboda	Austria	44.34
8	Nick Beighton	Great Britain	44.85
9	Ivo Kilian	Germany	45.99
