= 2018 ICF Canoe Sprint World Championships – Men's VL3 =

Men's VL3 at the 2018 ICF Canoe Sprint World Championships
- Venue: Centro de Alto Rendimento de Montemor-o-Velho
- Location: Montemor-o-Velho, Portugal
- Dates: 22–25 August
- Competitors: 26 from 18 nations
- Winning time: 47.642

Medalists
gold medal	Curtis McGrath	Australia
silver medal	Caio Ribeiro de Carvalho	Brazil
bronze medal	Jack Eyers	Great Britain

The men's VL3 competition at the 2018 ICF Canoe Sprint World Championships in Montemor-o-Velho took place at the Centro de Alto Rendimento de Montemor-o-Velho.

== Schedule ==
The schedule was as follows:

Date	Time	Round
Wednesday 22 August 2018	15:05	Heats
Wednesday 22 August 2018	16:30	Semifinals
Saturday 25 August 2018	10:53	Final B
Saturday 25 August 2018	10:59	Final A

All times are Western European Summer Time (UTC+1)

== Results ==
=== Heats ===
Heat winners advanced directly to the A final. The next six fastest boats in each heat advanced to the semifinals.

==== Heat 1 ====
Rank	Name	Country	Time	Notes
1	Egor Firsov	Russia	57.735	QA
2	Javier Reja Muñoz	Spain	57.995	QS
3	Patrick Viriamu	Tahiti	59.500	QS
4	Peter Cowan	New Zealand	1:00.070	QS
5	Patrick O'Leary	Ireland	1:00.560	QS
6	Jack Eyers	Great Britain	1:00.775	QS
7	Emilio Atamañuk	Argentina	1:02.245	QS
8	Masaaki Suwa	Japan	1:09.036	
9	Abraão Vieira	Portugal	1:29.782	

==== Heat 2 ====
Rank	Name	Country	Time	Notes
1	Curtis McGrath	Australia	52.925	QA
2	Caio Ribeiro de Carvalho	Brazil	56.461	QS
3	Scott Martlew	New Zealand	57.321	QS
4	Fabrizio Aprile	Italy	57.436	QS
5	Markus Swoboda	Austria	58.406	QS
6	Jamey Parks	United States	1:00.746	QS
7	Zbigniew Olizarowicz	Poland	1:00.981	QS
8	Adrián Mosquera	Spain	1:09.276	

==== Heat 3 ====
Rank	Name	Country	Time	Notes
1	Eddie Potdevin	France	54.758	QA
2	David Phillipson	Great Britain	56.753	QS
3	Tomasz Moździerski	Poland	57.138	QS
4	Mykola Syniuk	Ukraine	58.504	QS
5	Ivo Kilian	Germany	1:01.174	QS
6	Volodymyr Velhun	Ukraine	1:02.084	QS
7	Ronan Bernard	France	1:02.314	QS
8	Aleksei Byvaltcev	Russia	1:06.119	
9	Hiromi Tatsumi	Japan	1:08.249	

=== Semifinals ===
The fastest three boats in each semi advanced to the A final.
The next four fastest boats in each semi, plus the fastest remaining boat advanced to the B final.

==== Semifinal 1 ====
Rank	Name	Country	Time	Notes
1	David Phillipson	Great Britain	56.695	QA
2	Jack Eyers	Great Britain	58.385	QA
3	Fabrizio Aprile	Italy	58.410	QA
4	Mykola Syniuk	Ukraine	58.450	QB
5	Scott Martlew	New Zealand	58.470	QB
6	Patrick Viriamu	Tahiti	58.720	QB
7	Patrick O'Leary	Ireland	1:00.535	QB
8	Jamey Parks	United States	1:00.650	qB
9	Ronan Bernard	France	1:01.980	

==== Semifinal 2 ====
Rank	Name	Country	Time	Notes
1	Caio Ribeiro de Carvalho	Brazil	55.194	QA
2	Javier Reja Muñoz	Spain	56.644	QA
3	Markus Swoboda	Austria	57.304	QA
4	Tomasz Moździerski	Poland	57.794	QB
5	Zbigniew Olizarowicz	Poland	59.944	QB
6	Peter Cowan	New Zealand	1:00.014	QB
7	Ivo Kilian	Germany	1:00.549	QB
8	Volodymyr Velhun	Ukraine	1:00.789	
9	Emilio Atamañuk	Argentina	1:01.855	

=== Finals ===
==== Final B ====
Competitors in this final raced for positions 10 to 18.

Rank	Name	Country	Time
1	Tomasz Moździerski	Poland	50.818
2	Scott Martlew	New Zealand	52.348
3	Patrick O'Leary	Ireland	52.788
4	Peter Cowan	New Zealand	52.953
5	Ivo Kilian	Germany	53.083
6	Jamey Parks	United States	53.113
7	Patrick Viriamu	Tahiti	53.183
8	Zbigniew Olizarowicz	Poland	54.133
9	Mykola Syniuk	Ukraine	54.938

==== Final A ====
Competitors in this final raced for positions 1 to 9, with medals going to the top three.

Rank	Name	Country	Time
1st place, gold medalist(s)	Curtis McGrath	Australia	47.642
2nd place, silver medalist(s)	Caio Ribeiro de Carvalho	Brazil	48.837
3rd place, bronze medalist(s)	Jack Eyers	Great Britain	49.492
4	David Phillipson	Great Britain	49.747
5	Eddie Potdevin	France	50.197
6	Egor Firsov	Russia	51.227
7	Fabrizio Aprile	Italy	51.647
8	Markus Swoboda	Austria	52.042
9	Javier Reja Muñoz	Spain	52.937
