= 2018 ICF Canoe Sprint World Championships – Men's KL2 =

Men's KL2 at the 2018 ICF Canoe Sprint World Championships
- Venue: Centro de Alto Rendimento de Montemor-o-Velho
- Location: Montemor-o-Velho, Portugal
- Dates: 22–24 August
- Competitors: 24 from 20 nations
- Winning time: 41.735

Medalists
| gold medal | Curtis McGrath | Australia |
| silver medal | Scott Martlew | New Zealand |
| bronze medal | Mykola Syniuk | Ukraine |

The men's KL2 competition at the 2018 ICF Canoe Sprint World Championships in Montemor-o-Velho took place at the Centro de Alto Rendimento de Montemor-o-Velho.

== Schedule ==
The schedule was as follows:

| Date | Time | Round |
|---|---|---|
| Wednesday 22 August 2018 | 11:10 | Heats |
| Wednesday 22 August 2018 | 12:35 | Semifinals |
| Friday 24 August 2018 | 10:15 | Final B |
| Friday 24 August 2018 | 10:21 | Final A |

All times are Western European Summer Time (UTC+1)

== Results ==
=== Heats ===
Heat winners advanced directly to the A final. The next six fastest boats in each heat advanced to the semifinals.

==== Heat 1 ====
| Rank | Name | Country | Time | Notes |
|---|---|---|---|---|
| 1 | Curtis McGrath | Australia | 43.196 | QA |
| 2 | Ivo Kilian | Germany | 48.187 | QS |
| 3 | Bibarys Spatay | Kazakhstan | 48.912 | QS |
| 4 | Robert Studzizba | Poland | 50.727 | QS |
| 5 | Emilio Atamañuk | Argentina | 51.057 | QS |
| 6 | Shi Wei | China | 53.517 | QS |
| 7 | Takanori Kato | Japan | 1:00.562 | QS |
| – | Andrei Tkachuk | Belarus | DNS | |

==== Heat 2 ====
| Rank | Name | Country | Time | Notes |
|---|---|---|---|---|
| 1 | Scott Martlew | New Zealand | 44.062 | QA |
| 2 | Fernando Rufino de Paulo | Brazil | 44.422 | QS |
| 3 | Nick Beighton | Great Britain | 44.752 | QS |
| 4 | Federico Mancarella | Italy | 45.592 | QS |
| 5 | Markus Swoboda | Austria | 45.882 | QS |
| 6 | David Phillipson | Great Britain | 48.643 | QS |
| 7 | Hugo Costa | Portugal | 51.003 | QS |
| 8 | Or Adato | Israel | 53.788 | |

==== Heat 3 ====
| Rank | Name | Country | Time | Notes |
|---|---|---|---|---|
| 1 | Mykola Syniuk | Ukraine | 44.439 | QA |
| 2 | Vuk Radovanović | Serbia | 47.469 | QS |
| 3 | Volodymyr Velhun | Ukraine | 48.329 | QS |
| 4 | Norberto Mourão | Portugal | 49.169 | QS |
| 5 | András Rozbora | Hungary | 50.304 | QS |
| 6 | Igor Korobeynikov | Russia | 52.234 | QS |
| 7 | Higinio Rivero | Spain | 52.499 | QS |
| 8 | Javier Reja Muñoz | Spain | 55.105 | |

=== Semifinals ===
The fastest three boats in each semi advanced to the A final.
The next four fastest boats in each semi, plus the fastest remaining boat advanced to the B final.

==== Semifinal 1 ====
| Rank | Name | Country | Time | Notes |
|---|---|---|---|---|
| 1 | Federico Mancarella | Italy | 44.470 | QA |
| 2 | Nick Beighton | Great Britain | 44.590 | QA |
| 3 | Vuk Radovanović | Serbia | 47.555 | QA |
| 4 | David Phillipson | Great Britain | 47.820 | QB |
| 5 | Norberto Mourão | Portugal | 48.815 | QB |
| 6 | Bibarys Spatay | Kazakhstan | 48.955 | QB |
| 7 | Shi Wei | China | 51.835 | QB |
| 8 | Emilio Atamañuk | Argentina | 52.581 | |
| 9 | Higinio Rivero | Spain | 57.226 | |

==== Semifinal 2 ====
| Rank | Name | Country | Time | Notes |
|---|---|---|---|---|
| 1 | Fernando Rufino de Paulo | Brazil | 44.004 | QA |
| 2 | Markus Swoboda | Austria | 44.834 | QA |
| 3 | Ivo Kilian | Germany | 47.485 | QA |
| 4 | Volodymyr Velhun | Ukraine | 48.125 | QB |
| 5 | Robert Studzizba | Poland | 50.075 | QB |
| 6 | András Rozbora | Hungary | 51.540 | QB |
| 7 | Hugo Costa | Portugal | 51.880 | QB |
| 8 | Igor Korobeynikov | Russia | 52.535 | qB |
| 9 | Takanori Kato | Japan | 1:02.485 | |

=== Finals ===
==== Final B ====
Competitors in this final raced for positions 10 to 18.

| Rank | Name | Country | Time |
|---|---|---|---|
| 1 | Volodymyr Velhun | Ukraine | 46.805 |
| 2 | Bibarys Spatay | Kazakhstan | 46.865 |
| 3 | David Phillipson | Great Britain | 47.165 |
| 4 | Norberto Mourão | Portugal | 47.195 |
| 5 | Robert Studzizba | Poland | 48.405 |
| 6 | András Rozbora | Hungary | 49.555 |
| 7 | Shi Wei | China | 50.135 |
| 8 | Hugo Costa | Portugal | 50.215 |
| 9 | Igor Korobeynikov | Russia | 50.410 |

==== Final A ====
Competitors in this final raced for positions 1 to 9, with medals going to the top three.

| Rank | Name | Country | Time |
|---|---|---|---|
| 1st place, gold medalist(s) | Curtis McGrath | Australia | 41.735 |
| 2nd place, silver medalist(s) | Scott Martlew | New Zealand | 42.360 |
| 3rd place, bronze medalist(s) | Mykola Syniuk | Ukraine | 43.230 |
| 4 | Markus Swoboda | Austria | 43.605 |
| 5 | Federico Mancarella | Italy | 43.795 |
| 6 | Fernando Rufino de Paulo | Brazil | 43.865 |
| 7 | Nick Beighton | Great Britain | 44.160 |
| 8 | Ivo Kilian | Germany | 46.130 |
| 9 | Vuk Radovanović | Serbia | 48.520 |
