= 2023 ICF Canoe Sprint World Championships – Men's KL2 =

Men's KL2 at the 2023 ICF Canoe Sprint World Championships
- Venue: Sportpark Duisburg
- Location: Duisburg, Germany
- Dates: 23–25 August
- Competitors: 27 from 22 nations
- Winning time: 40.200

Medalists
gold medal	Curtis McGrath	Australia
silver medal	Mykola Syniuk	Ukraine
bronze medal	Federico Mancarella	Italy

The men's KL2 competition at the 2023 ICF Canoe Sprint World Championships in Duisburg took place at Sportpark Duisburg.

== Schedule ==
The schedule was as follows:

Date	Time	Round
Wednesday 23 August 2023	10:55	Heats
Friday 25 August 2023	12:47	Semifinals
Friday 25 August 2023	17:30	Final A
Friday 25 August 2023	18:36	Final B

All times are Central European Summer Time (UTC+2)

== Results ==
=== Heats ===
Heat winners advanced directly to the A final.
The next six fastest boats in each heat advanced to the semifinals.

==== Heat 1 ====
Rank	Name	Country	Time	Notes
1	Mykola Syniuk	Ukraine	42.097	QA
2	Bibarys Spatay	Kazakhstan	42.826	QS
3	Emilio Ariel Atamanuk	Argentina	43.465	QS
4	Strahinja Bukvić	Serbia	43.564	QS
5	Uilian Ferreira Mendes	Brazil	45.489	QS
6	Adi Ezra	Israel	45.953	QS
7	András Rozbora	Hungary	47.636	QS
8	Franco Gutiérrez	Chile	48.515	
9	Younho On	South Korea	49.293	

==== Heat 2 ====
Rank	Name	Country	Time	Notes
1	Curtis McGrath	Australia	40.695	QA
2	David Phillipson	Great Britain	41.585	QS
3	Markus Swoboda	Austria	42.423	QS
4	Christian Volpi	Italy	42.748	QS
5	Olasupo Temitope Hassan	Nigeria	46.982	QS
6	Vuk Radovanović	Serbia	47.065	QS
7	Mehdi Deghmache	France	48.798	QS
8	Martin Diatta	Senegal	50.192	
9	Wei Shi	Chile	51.231	

==== Heat 3 ====
Rank	Name	Country	Time	Notes
1	Azizbek Abdulkhabibov	Uzbekistan	41.496	QA
2	Scott Martlew	New Zealand	41.753	QS
3	Fernando Rufino	Brazil	41.931	QS
4	Federico Mancarella	Italy	42.027	QS
5	Tibor Kiss	Hungary	44.708	QS
6	Javier Reja Muñoz	Spain	46.678	QS
7	Sanjeev Kotiya	India	48.988	QS
8	Ahmed Naguib	Egypt	49.911	
	Mauricio Adan Grotiuz	Uruguay	DNF	

=== Semifinals ===
The fastest three boats in each semi advanced to the A final.
The next four fastest boats in each semi, plus the fastest remaining boat advanced to the B final.

==== Semifinal 1 ====
Rank	Name	Country	Time	Notes
1	Federico Mancarella	Italy	42.581	QA
2	Markus Swoboda	Austria	42.853	QA
3	Bibarys Spatay	Kazakhstan	42.948	QA
4	Fernando Rufino	Brazil	43.058	QB
5	Strahinja Bukvić	Serbia	45.074	QB
6	Adi Ezra	Israel	46.714	QB
7	Javier Reja Muñoz	Spain	47.387	QB
8	Mehdi Deghmache	France	48.198	qB
9	Olasupo Temitope Hassan	Nigeria	56.422	

==== Semifinal 2 ====
Rank	Name	Country	Time	Notes
1	Scott Martlew	New Zealand	42.821	QA
2	Christian Volpi	Italy	43.513	QA
3	Emilio Ariel Atamanuk	Argentina	44.506	QA
4	David Phillipson	Great Britain	44.513	QB
5	Tibor Kiss	Hungary	46.271	QB
6	Uilian Ferreira Mendes	Brazil	47.148	QB
7	Vuk Radovanović	Serbia	48.190	QB
8	András Rozbora	Hungary	49.057	
9	Sanjeev Kotiya	India	49.620	

=== Finals ===
==== Final B ====
Competitors raced for positions 10 to 18.

Rank	Name	Country	Time
1	David Phillipson	Great Britain	43.263
2	Fernando Rufino	Brazil	43.366
3	Strahinja Bukvić	Serbia	45.021
4	Tibor Kis	Hungary	46.471
5	Uilian Ferreira Mendes	Brazil	46.492
6	Adi Ezra	Israel	47.134
7	Javier Reja Muñoz	Spain	47.756
8	Mehdi Deghmache	France	49.258
9	Vuk Radovanović	Serbia	49.530

==== Final A ====
Competitors raced for positions 1 to 9, with medals going to the top three.

Rank	Name	Country	Time
1st place, gold medalist(s)	Curtis McGrath	Australia	40.200
2nd place, silver medalist(s)	Mykola Syniuk	Ukraine	41.614
3rd place, bronze medalist(s)	Federico Mancarella	Italy	41.658
4	Scott Martlew	New Zealand	42.071
5	Bibarys Spatay	Kazakhstan	42.128
6	Azizbek Abdulkhabibov	Uzbekistan	42.208
7	Christian Volpi	Italy	42.282
8	Markus Swoboda	Austria	42.314
9	Emilio Ariel Atamanuk	Argentina	43.835
