= 2026 ICF Canoe Sprint World Championships – Men's KL2 =

Men's KL2 at the 2026 ICF Canoe Sprint World Championships
- Venue: Lake Malta
- Location: Poznań, Poland
- Dates: 26-30 August
- Competitors: 31 from 31 nations
- Winning time: 42.76

Medalists
gold medal	Curtis McGrath	Australia
silver medal	Fernando Rufino	Brazil
bronze medal	Azizbek Abdulkhabibov	Uzbekistan

The men's KL2 competition at the 2026 ICF Canoe Sprint World Championships in Poznań took place at Lake Malta.

== Schedule ==
The schedule is as follows:

Date	Round
Thursday 27 August 2026	Heats
Saturday 29 August 2026	Semifinals
Sunday 30 August 2026	Final B
Sunday 30 August 2026	Final A

== Record ==
The best performance previously in this discipline was:

World Best	Time	Athlete	Nation	Venue
World Best	41.13	Curtis McGrath	Australia	Tokyo (Japan)

=== Heats ===
Four heats were held. The results of those heats was as follows:

Qualification rule : First six in each heat (SF) plus three next fastest (qBT) qualify for semi-finals; remainder are eliminated.

Heat 1

Rank	Lane	Name	Nation	Time	Gap	Notes
1	5	David Phillipson	Great Britain	45.17		SF
2	3	Curtis McGrath	Australia	45.26	+0.09	SF
3	1	Markus Mendy Swoboda	Austria	46.25	+1.08	SF
4	6	Flavio Reitz	Brazil	46.30	+1.13	SF
5	4	Tibor Kiss	Hungary	47.29	+2.12	SF
6	8	Jose Javier Pineiro	Spain	47.93	+2.76	SF
7	2	Yasuhide Kobayashi	Japan	1:14.89	+29.72	
8	7	Mircea Ioan Campeanu	Romania	1:14.92	+29.75	

Heat 2

Rank	Lane	Name	Nation	Time	Gap	Notes
1	2	Fernando Rufino	Brazil	46.47		SF
2	5	Christian Volpi	Italy	46.63	+0.16	SF
3	4	Oybek Yuldashev	Uzbekistan	47.33	+0.86	SF
4	6	Emilio Ariel Atamanuk	Argentina	48.55	+2.08	SF
5	1	Yuguo Duan	China	55.36	+8.89	SF
6	3	Jacob Carlsson	Sweden	1:01.11	+14.64	SF
7	7	Mauricio Adan Grotiuz	Uruguay	1:02.75	+16.28	qBT
8	8	Alexandru Cebotari	Romania	1:05.21	+18.74	

Heat 3

Rank	Lane	Name	Nation	Time	Gap	Notes
1	5	Azizbek Abdulkhabibov	Uzbekistan	45.49		SF
2	6	Franco Gutierrez	Chile	45.65	+0.16	SF
3	4	Bibarys Spatay	Kazakhstan	48.02	+2.53	SF
4	7	Francesco Vallon	Italy	52.41	+6.92	SF
5	1	Rudy Garcia-Tolson	United States	52.82	+7.33	SF
6	3	Liangwen Chen	China	55.58	+10.09	SF
7	2	Rajveer Singh	India	55.83	+10.34	qBT
8	8	Frederik Dziegiel Sondergaard	Denmark	1:00.08	+14.59	

Heat 4

Rank	Lane	Name	Nation	Time	Gap	Notes
1	5	Scott Martlew	New Zealand	47.03		SF
2	6	Adi Ezra	Israel	47.60	+0.57	SF
3	4	Mykola Syniuk	Ukraine	50.32	+3.29	SF
4	8	Patipol Thippaphathanat	Thailand	53.76	+6.73	SF
5	3	Hiromi Tatsumi	Japan	54.12	+7.09	SF
6	2	Declan Farmer	United States	56.98	+9.95	SF
7	7	Arnt-Christian Furuberg	Sweden	59.92	+12.89	qBT

=== Semi finals ===
Three semifinals were held. The results of those races was as follows:

Qualification rule : First three in each heat to A final: Next three in each heat to B final.

Semifinal 1

Rank	Lane	Name	Nation	Time	Gap	Notes
1	4	Curtis McGrath	Australia	41.78		FA
2	6	Fernando Rufino	Brazil	42.76	0.98	FA
3	5	Scott Martlew	New Zealand	43.63	1.85	FA
4	3	Bibarys Spatay	Kazakhstan	43.81	2.03	FB
5	8	Jose Javier Pineiro	Spain	44.58	2.80	FB
6	2	Hiromi Tatsumi	Japan	48.86	7.08	FB
7	7	Francesco Vallon	Italy	49.06	7.28	
8	9	Rajveer Singh	India	51.19	9.41	
9	1	Jacob Carlsson	Sweden	56.30	14.52	

Semifinal 2

Rank	Lane	Name	Nation	Time	Gap	Notes
1	5	Azizbek Abdulkhabibov	Uzbekistan	42.33		FA
2	6	Markus Mendy Swoboda	Austria	43.03	0.70	FA
3	3	Oybek Yuldashev	Uzbekistan	43.47	1.14	FA
4	4	Adi Ezra	Israel	44.27	1.94	FB
5	8	Tibor Kiss	Hungary	44.47	2.14	FB
6	7	Emilio Ariel Atamanuk	Argentina	46.06	3.73	FB
7	9	Liangwen Chen	China	50.46	8.13	
8	1	Arnt-Christian Furuberg	Sweden	59.31	16.98	
	2	Patipol Thippaphathanat	Thailand	DNF		

Semifinal 3

Rank	Lane	Name	Nation	Time	Gap	Notes
1	4	Franco Gutierrez	Chile	42.49	0.00	FA
2	7	Flavio Reitz	Brazil	42.77	0.28	FA
3	6	Christian Volpi	Italy	42.80	0.31	FA
4	5	David Phillipson	Great Britain	42.91	0.42	FB
5	3	Mykola Syniuk	Ukraine	45.28	2.79	FB
6	8	Rudy Garcia-Tolson	United States	47.87	5.38	FB
7	2	Yuguo Duan	China	49.80	7.31	
8	9	Declan Farmer	United States	49.87	7.38	
9	1	Mauricio Adan Grotiuz	Uruguay	59.72	17.23	

=== Finals ===
The results of the finals were as follows:

B final

Rank	Lane	Name	Nation	Time	Gap	Notes
1	4	David Phillipson	Great Britain	43.69		
2	6	Adi Ezra	Israel	44.98	+ 1.29	
3	5	Bibarys Spatay	Kazakhstan	45.45	+ 1.76	
4	1	Emilio Ariel Atamanuk	Argentina	45.57	+ 1.88	
5	3	Tibor Kiss	Hungary	45.73	+ 2.04	
6	7	Jose Javier Pineiro	Spain	45.83	+ 2.14	
7	8	Mykola Syniuk	Ukraine	46.03	+ 2.34	
8	2	Hiromi Tatsumi	Japan	49.80	+ 6.11	
9	9	Rudy Garcia-Tolson	United States	49.84	+ 6.15	

A final

Rank	Lane	Name	Nation	Time	Gap	Notes
1st place, gold medalist(s)	5	Curtis McGrath	Australia	42.76		
2nd place, silver medalist(s)	3	Fernando Rufino	Brazil	42.79	+ 0.03	
3rd place, bronze medalist(s)	4	Azizbek Abdulkhabibov	Uzbekistan	43.22	+ 0.46	
4	2	Flavio Reitz	Brazil	43.44	+ 0.68	
5	6	Franco Gutierrez	Chile	43.57	+ 0.81	
6	7	Markus Mendy Swoboda	Austria	43.78	+ 1.02	
7	9	Christian Volpi	Italy	44.13	+ 1.37	
8	1	Oybek Yuldashev	Uzbekistan	44.44	+ 1.68	
9	8	Scott Martlew	New Zealand	45.21	+ 2.45	
