= 2019 ICF Canoe Sprint World Championships – Men's VL3 =

Men's VL3 at the 2019 ICF Canoe Sprint World Championships
- Venue: Olympic Centre of Szeged
- Location: Szeged, Hungary
- Dates: 21–22 August
- Competitors: 27 from 19 nations
- Winning time: 47.42

Medalists
gold medal	Curtis McGrath	Australia
silver medal	Caio Ribeiro de Carvalho	Brazil
bronze medal	Stuart Wood	Great Britain

The men's VL3 competition at the 2019 ICF Canoe Sprint World Championships in Szeged took place at the Olympic Centre of Szeged.

== Schedule ==
The schedule was as follows:

Date	Time	Round
Wednesday 21 August 2019	15:50	Heats
Thursday 22 August 2019	10:55	Semifinals
Thursday 22 August 2019	16:25	Final B
Thursday 22 August 2019	16:40	Final A

All times are Central European Summer Time (UTC+2)

== Results ==
=== Heats ===
Heat winners advanced directly to the A final.
The next six fastest boats in each heat advanced to the semifinals.

==== Heat 1 ====
Rank	Name	Country	Time	Notes
1	Stuart Wood	Great Britain	47.93	QA
2	Vladyslav Yepifanov	Ukraine	49.07	QS
3	Scott Martlew	New Zealand	50.28	QS
4	Patrick Viriamu	France	50.49	QS
5	Arturo Edwards	Chile	50.65	QS
6	Zbigniew Olizarowicz	Poland	52.09	QS
7	Michael McCallum	United States	52.58	QS
8	Markus Swoboda	Austria	56.22	
9	Marksuel Nausien	Vanuatu	1:08.32	

==== Heat 2 ====
Rank	Name	Country	Time	Notes
1	Curtis McGrath	Australia	47.45	QA
2	Khaytmurot Sherkuziev	Uzbekistan	47.62	QS
3	Egor Firsov	Russia	48.57	QS
4	Martin Tweedie	Great Britain	49.33	QS
5	Jamey Parks	United States	50.05	QS
6	Emilio Atamañuk	Argentina	50.86	QS
7	Javier Reja Muñoz	Spain	51.00	QS
8	Mirko Nicoli	Italy	52.91	
9	Allgower Maruae	Tahiti	55.47	

==== Heat 3 ====
Rank	Name	Country	Time	Notes
1	Caio Ribeiro de Carvalho	Brazil	48.40	QA
2	Patrick O'Leary	Ireland	49.17	QS
3	Eddie Potdevin	France	49.77	QS
4	Tomasz Moździerski	Poland	50.67	QS
5	Fabrizio Aprile	Italy	51.14	QS
6	Maksim Popov	Russia	51.81	QS
7	Peter Cowan	New Zealand	52.19	QS
8	Henadzi Kuzura	Belarus	53.37	
9	Adrián Mosquera	Spain	1:01.50	

=== Semifinals ===
Qualification was as follows:

The fastest three boats in each semi advanced to the A final.
The next four fastest boats in each semi, plus the fastest remaining boat advanced to the B final.

==== Semifinal 1 ====
Rank	Name	Country	Time	Notes
1	Patrick O'Leary	Ireland	49.38	QA
2	Egor Firsov	Russia	50.46	QA
3	Martin Tweedie	Great Britain	50.72	QA
4	Tomasz Moździerski	Poland	50.94	QB
5	Scott Martlew	New Zealand	51.00	QB
6	Arturo Edwards	Chile	51.42	QB
7	Emilio Atamañuk	Argentina	51.73	QB
8	Peter Cowan	New Zealand	52.82	
9	Zbigniew Olizarowicz	Poland	55.71	

==== Semifinal 2 ====
Rank	Name	Country	Time	Notes
1	Khaytmurot Sherkuziev	Uzbekistan	48.54	QA
2	Eddie Potdevin	France	49.58	QA
3	Vladyslav Yepifanov	Ukraine	50.05	QA
4	Fabrizio Aprile	Italy	50.37	QB
4	Jamey Parks	United States	50.37	QB
6	Patrick Viriamu	France	51.65	QB
7	Maksim Popov	Russia	51.87	QB
8	Javier Reja Muñoz	Spain	52.07	qB
9	Michael McCallum	United States	52.45	

=== Finals ===
==== Final B ====
Competitors in this final raced for positions 10 to 18.

Rank	Name	Country	Time
1	Tomasz Moździerski	Poland	50.73
2	Scott Martlew	New Zealand	50.76
3	Fabrizio Aprile	Italy	50.90
4	Jamey Parks	United States	50.92
5	Patrick Viriamu	France	51.02
6	Arturo Edwards	Chile	51.14
7	Emilio Atamañuk	Argentina	51.51
8	Maksim Popov	Russia	51.97
9	Javier Reja Muñoz	Spain	53.18

==== Final A ====
Competitors raced for positions 1 to 9, with medals going to the top three.

Rank	Name	Country	Time
1st place, gold medalist(s)	Curtis McGrath	Australia	47.42
2nd place, silver medalist(s)	Caio Ribeiro de Carvalho	Brazil	47.52
3rd place, bronze medalist(s)	Stuart Wood	Great Britain	48.42
4	Khaytmurot Sherkuziev	Uzbekistan	48.54
5	Patrick O'Leary	Ireland	49.27
6	Egor Firsov	Russia	49.85
7	Vladyslav Yepifanov	Ukraine	49.98
8	Eddie Potdevin	France	50.11
9	Martin Tweedie	Great Britain	50.24
