= 2017 ICF Canoe Sprint World Championships – Men's KL2 =

Men's KL2 at the 2017 ICF Canoe Sprint World Championships
- Venue: Sportcentrum Račice
- Location: Račice, Czech Republic
- Dates: 23–24 August
- Competitors: 20 from 19 nations
- Winning time: 41.758

Medalists
gold medal	Curtis McGrath	Australia
silver medal	Marcus Swoboda	Austria
bronze medal	Mykola Syniuk	Ukraine

The men's KL2 competition at the 2017 ICF Canoe Sprint World Championships in Račice took place at the Sportcentrum Račice.

== Schedule ==
The schedule was as follows:

Date	Time	Round
Wednesday 23 August 2017	09:25	Heats
Wednesday 23 August 2017	10:50	Semifinals
Thursday 24 August 2017	12:39	Final B
Thursday 24 August 2017	12:44	Final A

All times are Central European Summer Time (UTC+2)

== Results ==
=== Heats ===
Heat winners advanced directly to the A final. The next six fastest boats in each heat advanced to the semifinals.

==== Heat 1 ====
Rank	Name	Country	Time	Notes
1	Curtis McGrath	Australia	41.545	QA
2	Ivo Kilian	Germany	45.851	QS
3	Igor Alex Tofalini	Brazil	46.356	QS
4	Eslam Jahedi	Iran	49.912	QS
5	Javier Reja Muñoz	Spain	50.356	QS
6	Igor Korobeynikov	Russia	50.973	QS
–	Jorge Enrique Moreno	Colombia	DNS	

==== Heat 2 ====
Rank	Name	Country	Time	Notes
1	Markus Swoboda	Austria	42.257	QA
2	Azizbek Abdulkhabibov	Uzbekistan	43.818	QS
3	Federico Mancarella	Italy	47.729	QS
4	Filip Silvstrand Olsson	Sweden	50.502	QS
5	Or Adato	Israel	52.391	QS
6	Vuk Radovanović	Serbia	52.824	QS
7	Emilio Atamañuk	Argentina	53.235	QS

==== Heat 3 ====
Rank	Name	Country	Time	Notes
1	Mykola Syniuk	Ukraine	44.636	QA
2	Eddie Montañez	Puerto Rico	46.409	QS
3	Dejan Fabčič	Slovenia	48.720	QS
4	Robert Studzizba	Poland	49.803	QS
5	Marius Bogdan Ciustea	Italy	52.864	QS
6	Oliver Molina	Chile	55.731	QS

=== Semifinals ===
The fastest three boats in each semi advanced to the A final.
The next four fastest boats in each semi, plus the fastest remaining boat advanced to the B final.

==== Semifinal 1 ====
Rank	Name	Country	Time	Notes
1	Federico Mancarella	Italy	45.060	QA
2	Ivo Kilian	Germany	46.071	QA
3	Robert Studzizba	Poland	47.088	QA
4	Dejan Fabčič	Slovenia	48.699	QB
5	Eslam Jahedi	Iran	48.871	QB
6	Igor Korobeynikov	Russia	50.082	QB
7	Or Adato	Israel	51.310	QB
8	Emilio Atamañuk	Argentina	52.932	qB
9	Oliver Molina	Chile	55.321	

==== Semifinal 2 ====
Rank	Name	Country	Time	Notes
1	Azizbek Abdulkhabibov	Uzbekistan	43.857	QA
2	Vuk Radovanović	Serbia	45.190	QA
3	Eddie Montañez	Puerto Rico	45.418	QA
4	Igor Alex Tofalini	Brazil	46.312	QB
5	Javier Reja Muñoz	Spain	47.718	QB
6	Marius Bogdan Ciustea	Italy	49.340	QB
7	Filip Silvstrand Olsson	Sweden	50.218	QB

=== Finals ===
==== Final B ====
Competitors in this final raced for positions 10 to 18.

Rank	Name	Country	Time
1	Igor Alex Tofalini	Brazil	46.342
2	Dejan Fabčič	Slovenia	48.520
3	Javier Reja Muñoz	Spain	48.626
4	Marius Bogdan Ciustea	Italy	49.670
5	Eslam Jahedi	Iran	50.142
6	Igor Korobeynikov	Russia	50.820
7	Filip Silvstrand Olsson	Sweden	50.876
8	Or Adato	Israel	52.203
9	Emilio Atamañuk	Argentina	1:04.831

==== Final A ====
Competitors in this final raced for positions 1 to 9, with medals going to the top three.

Rank	Name	Country	Time
1st place, gold medalist(s)	Curtis McGrath	Australia	41.758
2nd place, silver medalist(s)	Markus Swoboda	Austria	42.508
3rd place, bronze medalist(s)	Mykola Syniuk	Ukraine	43.281
4	Azizbek Abdulkhabibov	Uzbekistan	44.192
5	Vuk Radovanović	Serbia	45.531
6	Federico Mancarella	Italy	45.642
7	Ivo Kilian	Germany	46.736
8	Eddie Montañez	Puerto Rico	46.753
–	Robert Studzizba	Poland	DNF
