= 2016 ICF Paracanoe World Championships – Men's VL2 =

Men's VL2 at the 2016 ICF Paracanoe World Championships
- Location: Duisburg, Germany
- Dates: 17–19 May
- Competitors: 10 from 9 nations
- Winning time: 51.267

Medalists
gold medal	Curtis McGrath	Australia
silver medal	Javier Reja Muñoz	Spain
bronze medal	Giuseppe de Lelio	Italy

The men's VL2 competition at the 2016 ICF Paracanoe World Championships took place in Duisburg.

== Schedule ==
The schedule was as follows:

Date	Time	Round
Tuesday 17 May 2016	16:00	Heats
Wednesday 18 May 2016	15:45	Semifinal
Thursday 19 May 2016	14:40	Final

All times are Central European Summer Time (UTC+2)

== Results ==
=== Heats ===
The fastest three boats in each heat advanced directly to the final. The next four fastest boats in each heat, plus the fastest remaining boat advanced to the semifinal.

==== Heat 1 ====
Rank	Name	Country	Time	Notes
1	Curtis McGrath	Australia	53.557	QF
2	Giuseppe de Lelio	Italy	59.518	QF
3	Alireza Kardooni	Germany	1:00.325	QF
4	Danzig Norberg	United States	1:01.101	QS
5	Arkadiusz Garbacz	Poland	1:09.577	QS

==== Heat 2 ====
Rank	Name	Country	Time	Notes
1	Javier Reja Muñoz	Spain	55.550	QF
2	Miklós Suha	Hungary	57.074	QF
3	Masaaki Suwa	Japan	1:04.719	QF
4	Ngamada Ngol Ndara	Italy	1:11.673	QS
5	Nitin Kumar Chandra	India	1:12.413	QS

=== Semifinal ===
The fastest three boats advanced to the final.

Rank	Name	Country	Time	Notes
1	Danzig Norberg	United States	58.677	QF
2	Arkadiusz Garbacz	Poland	1:04.594	QF
3	Ngamada Ngol Ndara	Italy	1:06.855	QF
4	Nitin Kumar Chandra	India	1:14.986	

=== Final ===
Competitors raced for positions 1 to 9, with medals going to the top three.

Rank	Name	Country	Time
1st place, gold medalist(s)	Curtis McGrath	Australia	51.267
2nd place, silver medalist(s)	Javier Reja Muñoz	Spain	53.909
3rd place, bronze medalist(s)	Giuseppe de Lelio	Italy	56.226
4	Miklós Suha	Hungary	57.538
5	Alireza Kardooni	Germany	59.066
6	Danzig Norberg	United States	59.840
7	Masaaki Suwa	Japan	1:05.085
8	Arkadiusz Garbacz	Poland	1:06.494
9	Ngamada Ngol Ndara	Italy	1:06.788
