= Canoe at the 2020 Summer Paralympics – Men's KL2 =

Men's KL2 at the XVI Paralympic Games
- Venue: Sea Forest Waterway
- Dates: 2–3 September 2021
- Competitors: 13 from 13 nations

Medalists
1st place, gold medalist(s)		Curtis McGrath	Australia
2nd place, silver medalist(s)		Mykola Syniuk	Ukraine
3rd place, bronze medalist(s)		Federico Mancarella	Italy

The Canoe Sprint men's KL2 event at the 2020 Paralympic Games took place on 2 and 3 September 2021. Two initial heats were held. Winners advanced directly to the final. The rest went into one of two semifinals, where the top three in each semifinal also advanced to the final.

== Schedule ==
Date	Time	Round
Thursday, 2 September 2021	09:50	Heats
Friday, 3 September 2021	09:58	Semifinals
Friday, 3 September 2021	11:10	Finals

== Results ==
=== Heats ===
Heat 1

Rank	Lane	Name	Nationality	Time	Notes
1	7	Scott Martlew	New Zealand	43.588	FA
2	5	Fernando Rufino de Paulo	Brazil	43.860	SF
3	4	Federico Mancarella	Italy	43.975	SF
4	1	Azizbek Abdulkhabibov	Uzbekistan	44.437	SF
5	3	Markus Swoboda	Austria	44.561	SF
6	6	Hiromi Tatsumi	Japan	47.757	SF
7	2	András Rozbora	Hungary	49.465	SF

Heat 2

Rank	Lane	Name	Nationality	Time	Notes
1	5	Mykola Syniuk	Ukraine	43.731	FA
2	4	David Phillipson	Great Britain	44.295	SF
3	7	Curtis McGrath	Australia	44.979	SF
4	3	Bibarys Spatay	Kazakhstan	46.717	SF
5	6	Emilio Atamañuk	Argentina	49.095	SF
6	2	Ivo Kilian	Germany	50.389	SF

=== Semifinals ===
Semifinal 1

Rank	Lane	Name	Nationality	Time	Notes
1	4	Curtis McGrath	Australia	41.134	FA, PB
2	5	Fernando Rufino de Paulo	Brazil	42.209	FA
3	6	Azizbek Abdulkhabibov	Uzbekistan	43.409	FA
4	3	Emilio Atamañuk	Argentina	45.316	FB
5	7	Hiromi Tatsumi	Japan	46.290	FB

Semifinal 2

Rank	Lane	Name	Nationality	Time	Notes
1	4	Federico Mancarella	Italy	42.292	FA
2	3	Markus Swoboda	Austria	42.697	FA
3	5	David Phillipson	Great Britain	43.075	FA
4	6	Bibarys Spatay	Kazakhstan	44.435	FB
5	2	András Rozbora	Hungary	47.066	FB
6	7	Ivo Kilian	Germany	48.247	FB

=== Finals ===
Final B

Rank	Lane	Name	Nationality	Time	Notes
9	4	Bibarys Spatay	Kazakhstan	45.025	
10	5	Emilio Atamañuk	Argentina	45.459	
11	3	Hiromi Tatsumi	Japan	47.325	
12	6	András Rozbora	Hungary	49.105	
13	2	Ivo Kilian	Germany	49.306	

Final A

Rank	Lane	Name	Nationality	Time	Notes
1st place, gold medalist(s)	6	Curtis McGrath	Australia	41.426	
2nd place, silver medalist(s)	4	Mykola Syniuk	Ukraine	42.503	
3rd place, bronze medalist(s)	3	Federico Mancarella	Italy	42.574	
4	5	Scott Martlew	New Zealand	42.880	
5	7	Markus Swoboda	Austria	43.090	
6	2	Fernando Rufino de Paulo	Brazil	43.217	
7	1	David Phillipson	Great Britain	43.348	
8	8	Azizbek Abdulkhabibov	Uzbekistan	43.584	
