= Canoe at the 2020 Summer Paralympics – Men's VL3 =

Men's VL3 at the XVI Paralympic Games
- Venue: Sea Forest Waterway
- Dates: 2–4 September 2021
- Competitors: 13 from 12 nations

Medalists
1st place, gold medalist(s)		Curtis McGrath	Australia
2nd place, silver medalist(s)		Giovane Vieira de Paula	Brazil
3rd place, bronze medalist(s)		Stuart Wood	Great Britain

The Canoe Sprint men's VL3 event at the 2020 Paralympic Games took place on 2 and 4 September 2021. Two initial heats were held. Winners advanced directly to the final. The rest went into one of two semifinals, where the top three in each semifinal also advanced to the final.

== Schedule ==
Date	Time	Round
Thursday, 2 September 2021	11:30	Heats
Saturday, 4 September 2021	10:19	Semifinals
Saturday, 4 September 2021	11:48	Finals

== Results ==
=== Heats ===
Heat 1

Rank	Lane	Name	Nationality	Time	Notes
1	7	Curtis McGrath	Australia	51.526	FA, PB
2	6	Stuart Wood	Great Britain	52.579	SF
3	4	Giovane Vieira de Paula	Brazil	53.435	SF
4	2	Khaytmurot Sherkuziev	Uzbekistan	54.269	SF
5	3	Patrick O'Leary	Ireland	54.470	SF
6	1	Scott Martlew	New Zealand	55.439	SF
7	5	Adrián Mosquera	Spain	56.773	SF

Heat 2

Rank	Lane	Name	Nationality	Time	Notes
1	5	Eddie Potdevin	France	53.216	FA
2	4	Emilio Atamañuk	Argentina	53.675	SF
3	7	Egor Firsov	RPC	54.094	SF
4	2	Caio Ribeiro de Carvalho	Brazil	55.691	SF
5	6	Koichi Imai	Japan	58.458	SF
–	3	Markus Swoboda	Austria	DSQ	

=== Semifinals ===
Semifinal 1

Rank	Lane	Name	Nationality	Time	Notes
1	5	Stuart Wood	Great Britain	50.004	FA, PB
2	6	Khaytmurot Sherkuziev	Uzbekistan	51.450	FA
3	7	Scott Martlew	New Zealand	51.704	FA
4	4	Egor Firsov	RPC	51.787	FB
5	3	Koichi Imai	Japan	54.992	FB

Semifinal 2

Rank	Lane	Name	Nationality	Time	Notes
1	4	Giovane Vieira de Paula	Brazil	51.087	FA
2	6	Caio Ribeiro de Carvalho	Brazil	51.315	FA
3	3	Patrick O'Leary	Ireland	51.939	FA
4	5	Emilio Atamañuk	Argentina	52.106	FB
5	2	Adrián Mosquera	Spain	54.968	FB

=== Finals ===
Final B

Rank	Lane	Name	Nationality	Time	Notes
9	5	Emilio Atamañuk	Argentina	53.531	
10	4	Egor Firsov	RPC	54.511	
11	3	Adrián Mosquera	Spain	55.845	
12	6	Koichi Imai	Japan	57.028	

Final A

Rank	Lane	Name	Nationality	Time	Notes
1st place, gold medalist(s)	4	Curtis McGrath	Australia	50.537	
2nd place, silver medalist(s)	6	Giovane Vieira de Paula	Brazil	52.148	
3rd place, bronze medalist(s)	3	Stuart Wood	Great Britain	52.760	
4	7	Khaytmurot Sherkuziev	Uzbekistan	52.793	
5	8	Patrick O'Leary	Ireland	52.910	
6	5	Eddie Potdevin	France	53.055	
7	2	Caio Ribeiro de Carvalho	Brazil	53.246	
8	1	Scott Martlew	New Zealand	54.756	
