= 2021 ICF Canoe Sprint World Championships – Men's KL2 =

Men's KL2 at the 2021 ICF Canoe Sprint World Championships
- Venue: Lake Bagsværd
- Location: Copenhagen, Denmark
- Dates: 16–18 September
- Competitors: 15 from 11 nations
- Winning time: 41.77

Medalists
gold medal	Mykola Syniuk	Ukraine
silver medal	Federico Mancarella	Italy
bronze medal	Markus Swoboda	Austria

The men's KL2 competition at the 2021 ICF Canoe Sprint World Championships in Copenhagen took place on Lake Bagsværd.

== Schedule ==
The schedule was as follows:

Date	Time	Round
Thursday 16 September 2021	09:10	Heats
Thursday 16 September 2021	11:35	Semifinal
Saturday 18 September 2021	10:38	Final

All times are Central European Summer Time (UTC+2)

== Results ==
=== Heats ===
The fastest three boats in each heat advanced directly to the final. The next four fastest boats in each heat, plus the fastest remaining boat advanced to the semifinal.

==== Heat 1 ====
Rank	Name	Country	Time	Notes
1	Federico Mancarella	Italy	45.12	QF
2	Nick Beighton	Great Britain	46.59	QF
3	Markus Swoboda	Austria	46.94	QF
4	Emilio Atamañuk	Argentina	47.56	QS
5	András Rozbora	Hungary	49.21	QS
6	Felix Höfner	Germany	50.01	QS
7	Javier Reja Muñoz	Spain	54.63	QS
8	Nazar Zahorodniev	Ukraine	1:06.32	qS

==== Heat 2 ====
Rank	Name	Country	Time	Notes
1	Fernando Rufino de Paulo	Brazil	44.01	QF
2	Mykola Syniuk	Ukraine	44.47	QF
3	David Phillipson	Great Britain	45.40	QF
4	Volodymyr Velhun	Ukraine	47.84	QS
5	Bibarys Spatay	Kazakhstan	47.86	QS
6	Stefan Samoila	Canada	51.59	QS
7	Csaba Rescsik	Hungary	52.95	QS

=== Semifinal ===
The fastest three boats advanced to the final.

Rank	Name	Country	Time	Notes
1	Emilio Atamañuk	Argentina	46.01	QF
2	Bibarys Spatay	Kazakhstan	46.70	QF
3	Volodymyr Velhun	Ukraine	47.51	QF
4	András Rozbora	Hungary	48.12	
5	Felix Höfner	Germany	48.19	
6	Stefan Samoila	Canada	51.74	
7	Csaba Rescsik	Hungary	52.21	
8	Javier Reja Muñoz	Spain	53.63	
9	Nazar Zahorodniev	Ukraine	1:01.94	

=== Final ===
Competitors raced for positions 1 to 9, with medals going to the top three.

Rank	Name	Country	Time
1st place, gold medalist(s)	Mykola Syniuk	Ukraine	41.77
2nd place, silver medalist(s)	Federico Mancarella	Italy	41.96
3rd place, bronze medalist(s)	Markus Swoboda	Austria	42.88
4	Fernando Rufino de Paulo	Brazil	43.13
5	David Phillipson	Great Britain	43.73
6	Emilio Atamañuk	Argentina	44.61
7	Nick Beighton	Great Britain	44.69
8	Bibarys Spatay	Kazakhstan	44.88
9	Volodymyr Velhun	Ukraine	45.43
