= 2022 ICF Canoe Sprint World Championships – Men's KL2 =

Professional sport championship

Men's KL2 at the 2022 ICF Canoe Sprint World Championships
- Venue: Lake Banook
- Location: Dartmouth, Canada
- Dates: 3–5 August
- Competitors: 13 from 11 nations
- Winning time: 42.97

Medalists
gold medal	Mykola Syniuk	Ukraine
silver medal	David Phillipson	Great Britain
bronze medal	Scott Martlew	New Zealand

The men's KL2 competition at the 2022 ICF Canoe Sprint World Championships in Dartmouth took place on Lake Banook.

== Schedule ==
The schedule was as follows:

Date	Time	Round
Wednesday 3 August 2022	10:35	Heats
Wednesday 3 August 2022	15:00	Semifinal
Friday 5 August 2022	11:36	Final

All times are Atlantic Daylight Time (UTC−3)

== Results ==
=== Heats ===
The fastest three boats in each heat advanced directly to the final.
The next four fastest boats in each heat, plus the fastest remaining boat advanced to the semifinal.

==== Heat 1 ====
Rank	Canoeist	Country	Time	Notes
1	Mykola Syniuk	Ukraine	42.87	QF
2	Scott Martlew	New Zealand	43.99	QF
3	Christian Volpi	Italy	45.02	QF
4	Emilio Atamañuk	Argentina	45.99	QS
5	Hiromi Tatsumi	Japan	49.35	QS
6	Grotiuz Adan	Uruguay	56.24	QS
7	Michael Ballard	United States	1:01.87	QS

==== Heat 2 ====
Rank	Canoeist	Country	Time	Notes
1	David Phillipson	Great Britain	44.50	QF
2	Federico Mancarella	Italy	45.30	QF
3	András Rozbora	Hungary	47.57	QF
4	Mariano Turner	Argentina	51.42	QS
5	Temitope Olasupo	Nigeria	52.59	QS
6	Stefan Samoila	Canada	53.65	QS

=== Semifinal ===
The fastest three boats advanced to the final.

Rank	Canoeist	Country	Time	Notes
1	Emilio Atamañuk	Argentina	47.42	QF
2	Hiromi Tatsumi	Japan	50.32	QF
3	Mariano Turner	Argentina	52.03	QF
4	Stefan Samoila	Canada	54.56	
5	Temitope Olasupo	Nigeria	56.88	
6	Grotiuz Adan	Uruguay	56.95	
7	Michael Ballard	United States	59.70	

=== Final ===
Competitors raced for positions 1 to 9, with medals going to the top three.

Rank	Name	Country	Time
1st place, gold medalist(s)	Mykola Syniuk	Ukraine	42.97
2nd place, silver medalist(s)	David Phillipson	Great Britain	43.95
3rd place, bronze medalist(s)	Scott Martlew	New Zealand	44.21
4	Federico Mancarella	Italy	44.35
5	Christian Volpi	Italy	44.63
6	Emilio Atamañuk	Argentina	46.79
7	András Rozbora	Hungary	47.51
8	Hiromi Tatsumi	Japan	48.82
9	Mariano Turner	Argentina	51.12
