= 2017 ICF Canoe Sprint World Championships – Men's VL2 =

Men's VL2 at the 2017 ICF Canoe Sprint World Championships
- Venue: Sportcentrum Račice
- Location: Račice, Czech Republic
- Dates: 23–26 August
- Competitors: 14 from 14 nations
- Winning time: 50.628

Medalists
gold medal	Curtis McGrath	Australia
silver medal	Marcus Swoboda	Austria
bronze medal	Javier Reja Muñoz	Spain

The men's VL2 competition at the 2017 ICF Canoe Sprint World Championships in Račice took place at the Sportcentrum Račice.

== Schedule ==
The schedule was as follows:

Date	Time	Round
Wednesday 23 August 2017	13:25	Heats
Wednesday 23 August 2017	14:30	Semifinal
Saturday 26 August 2017	14:40	Final

All times are Central European Summer Time (UTC+2)

== Results ==
=== Heats ===
The fastest three boats in each heat advanced directly to the final. The next four fastest boats in each heat, plus the fastest remaining boat advanced to the semifinal.

==== Heat 1 ====
Rank	Name	Country	Time	Notes
1	Curtis McGrath	Australia	49.290	QF
2	Ivo Kilian	Germany	52.635	QF
3	Egor Firsov	Russia	54.035	QF
4	Miklós Suha	Hungary	58.001	QS
5	Arkadiusz Garbacz	Poland	59.729	QS
6	Nitin Kumar Chandra	India	1:08.468	QS
7	Oliver Molina	Chile	1:08.935	QS

==== Heat 2 ====
Rank	Name	Country	Time	Notes
1	Markus Swoboda	Austria	52.531	QF
2	Javier Reja Muñoz	Spain	53.958	QF
3	Volodymyr Velhun	Ukraine	56.975	QF
4	Danzig Norberg	United States	58.208	QS
5	Giuseppe di Lelio	Italy	58.414	QS
6	Masaaki Suwa	Japan	1:02.225	QS
7	Or Adato	Israel	1:12.164	QS

=== Semifinal ===
The fastest three boats advanced to the final.

Rank	Name	Country	Time	Notes
1	Giuseppe di Lelio	Italy	56.562	QF
2	Danzig Norberg	United States	58.523	QF
3	Miklós Suha	Hungary	58.568	QF
4	Arkadiusz Garbacz	Poland	1:00.573	
5	Or Adato	Israel	1:03.729	
6	Masaaki Suwa	Japan	1:03.818	
7	Oliver Molina	Chile	1:05.668	
8	Nitin Kumar Chandra	India	1:11.306	

=== Final ===
Competitors raced for positions 1 to 9, with medals going to the top three.

Rank	Name	Country	Time
1st place, gold medalist(s)	Curtis McGrath	Australia	50.628
2nd place, silver medalist(s)	Markus Swoboda	Austria	52.312
3rd place, bronze medalist(s)	Javier Reja Muñoz	Spain	55.017
4	Ivo Kilian	Germany	55.184
5	Egor Firsov	Russia	55.473
6	Giuseppe di Lelio	Italy	57.584
7	Danzig Norberg	United States	58.951
8	Volodymyr Velhun	Ukraine	1:00.278
9	Miklós Suha	Hungary	1:00.773
