= Curtis McGrath =

Australian Para acanoeist (born 1988)

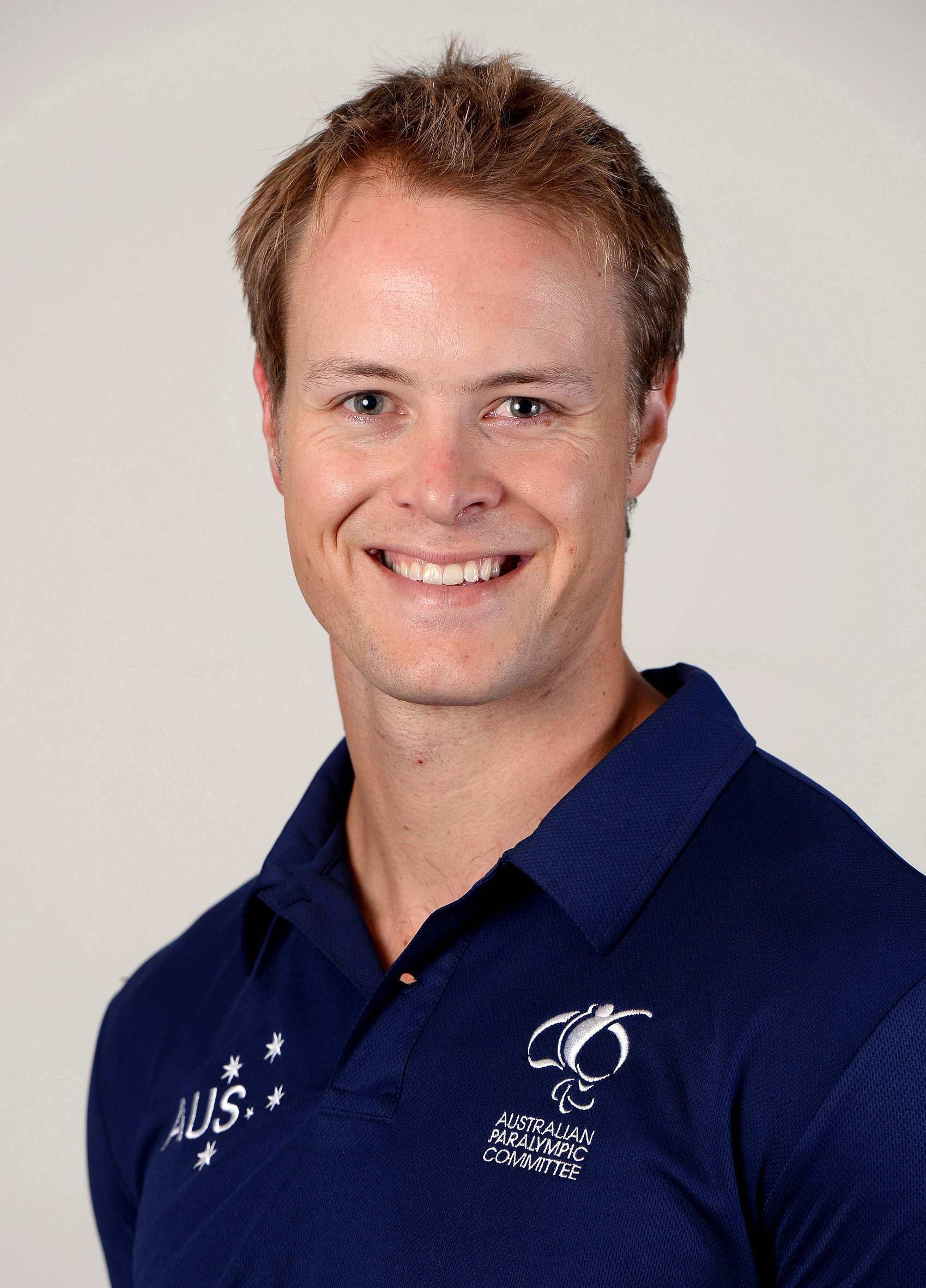
- 2016 Australian Paralympic team portrait

Personal information
- Full name: Curtis Wain McGrath
- Nationality: Australian
- Born: 31 March 1988 (age 38) New Zealand

Sport
- Country: New Zealand
- Sport: Para canoe
- Disability class: KL2; VL3
Medal record
Men's Para canoe
Representing Australia
Paralympic Games
Gold medal – first place	2016 Rio de Janeiro	KL2
Gold medal – first place	2020 Tokyo	KL2
Gold medal – first place	2020 Tokyo	VL3
Gold medal – first place	2024 Paris	KL2
World Championships
Gold medal – first place	2014 Moscow	V-1 TA
Gold medal – first place	2015 Milan	VL2
Gold medal – first place	2016 Duisburg	KL2
Gold medal – first place	2016 Duisburg	VL2
Gold medal – first place	2017 Račice	KL2
Gold medal – first place	2017 Račice	VL2
Gold medal – first place	2018 Montemor-o-Velho	KL2
Gold medal – first place	2018 Montemor-o-Velho	VL3
Gold medal – first place	2019 Szeged	KL2
Gold medal – first place	2019 Szeged	VL3
Gold medal – first place	2023 Duisburg	KL2
Gold medal – first place	2024 Szeged	KL2
Gold medal – first place	2026 Poznán	KL2
Silver medal – second place	Poznan	KL2
Bronze medal – third place	2023 Duisburg	VL3
Bronze medal – third place	2024 Szeged	VL3

Curtis Wain McGrath, OAM (born 31 March 1988) is an Australian Para canoeist and former soldier. He took up canoeing competitively after both of his legs were amputated as a result of a mine blast while serving with the Australian Army in Afghanistan. McGrath won consecutive gold medals in the Men's KL2 at the 2016 Rio and 2020 Tokyo Paralympics, and has won ten gold medals and a silver at ICF Paracanoe World Championships between 2014 and 2019.

== Personal ==
McGrath was born in New Zealand on 31 March 1988. His parents are Kimberley and Paul, and he has two siblings – Brent and Sophia. He grew up in Queenstown, New Zealand and attended Wakatipu High School. As a ten year old, his farming family moved to the Western Australian Wheatbelt but then returned to Queenstown. In his last year at high school, he was awarded the Bruce Grant Memorial Trophy for Outdoor Education. His family later relocated to Brisbane, Queensland. McGrath had a desire to become a jet pilot but became a combat engineer.

McGrath was awarded a Sporting Full Blue at Griffith University whilst studying a Bachelor of Aviation Management.

In 2024, he was appointed to the Paralympics Australia Board.

== Military career ==
McGrath joined the Australian Army in 2006. On 23 August 2012, as a combat engineer with the 6th Engineer Support Regiment, he was badly injured by an Improvised explosive device during operations in Khas Urozgan District, Uruzgan Province, Afghanistan. The explosion resulted in McGrath losing his left leg below the knee and his right leg at the knee. He had shattered bones in his wrist, burnt left arm, perforated ear drums and large wound at the back of his thigh. He was originally taken to an American medical base in Germany and then to Royal Brisbane Hospital for rehabilitation. Within three months, he was walking on prosthetic legs.

At the 2016 Australian Paralympic Team Launch in Sydney, Prime Minister Malcolm Turnbull made the following comments about McGrath:

... he has overcome those injuries through rehabilitation and intense training to become an elite paracanoeing competitor. Now only three years on from that shocking accident, that shocking event, those wounds, those injuries, he is out on the water representing Australia at Rio, providing an inspiration to our Defence Forces, to all our wounded warriors, those with a disability and those without. His story is a remarkable feat of triumph over adversity, triumph out of tragedy.

== Sporting career ==
Prior to his military injury, McGrath was a keen white water canoeist, rugby player and swimmer. He took up canoeing and swimming as part of his rehabilitation. His first disability sport experience was at the United States Marine Games in San Diego where he won three gold medals in swimming. In devoting his energy to sport, McGrath commented: "In sport, you are getting your body to do things you don't do every day. It helps your body to adjust more easily to everyday things."

In October 2013, McGrath, with his father Paul, participated in a 1,000 km paddle from Sydney to Queensland to raise funds for the Mates4Mates.

McGrath took up paracanoe in December 2013. He originally competed in V1 (Va'a Outrigger Canoe) in the TA (Trunk and arms category). In 2014, he won the Australian and Oceania Championships in V1 200 m, 500 m and 1000 m events. He is now classified as a KL2 paracanoeist. Almost two years after losing his legs in Afghanistan, he won the gold medal in the V1 200 TA event in world record time at the 2014 ICF Canoe Sprint World Championships in Moscow, Russia. After winning the gold medal McGrath commented: "Even when I was on the stretcher getting carried to the medevac chopper I said I was going to be in the Paralympics, and this is the first step". His aim is to compete at the 2016 Summer Paralympics, where paracanoeing makes it debut. In September 2014, he captained the Australian Team at inaugural Invictus Games in London, and won a bronze medal in swimming and made the archery final.

In March 2015, due to the International Paralympic Committee deciding not run the Va'a events in the 2016 Summer Paralympics, McGrath has switched to kayak events. At the 2015 ICF Canoe Sprint World Championships, in Milan, Italy, he won a gold medal in the Men's V–1 200 m VL2 and a silver medal in the Men's K–1 200 m VL2. After winning the silver medal in the Paralympic Games event, McGrath said: "This is a whole new ball game for me, the boats are a lot faster, so I had to learn pretty quick".

At the 2016 ICF Paracanoe World Championships in Duisburg, Germany, McGrath won two gold medals in Men's KL2 200m and VL2 200m. In winning the Men's KL2 200m, a Paralympic Games event, he defeated six time world champion Markus Swoboda.

McGrath competed at 2016 Invictus Games in Orlando, Florida, where he won IR4 one minute row. He also competed in swimming events.

McGrath fulfilled his goal of winning the Men's KL2 200 m at the 2016 Rio Paralympics in a Paralympic record time of 42.190. It was Australia's first gold medal in paracanoe at the Paralympics. He was given the honour of being the Australian flag bearer at the Rio Paralympics Closing Ceremony.

In February 2017, McGrath participated in a Rowing Australia Tokyo Paralympics training camp in Canberra. At the 2017 Australian Rowing Championships, Sydney International Regatta Centre, McGrath won the Trunk and Arms (TA) Men's Single Scull, in his first ever race.

At the 2017 ICF Canoe Sprint World Championships in Račice, Czech Republic, McGrath won gold medals in Men's KL2 200m and VL2 200m. McGrath won gold medals in the Men's KL2 200m and Men's VL3 200m at the 2018 ICF Canoe Sprint World Championships in Montemor-o-Velho, Portugal. It was his eight world championship gold medal.

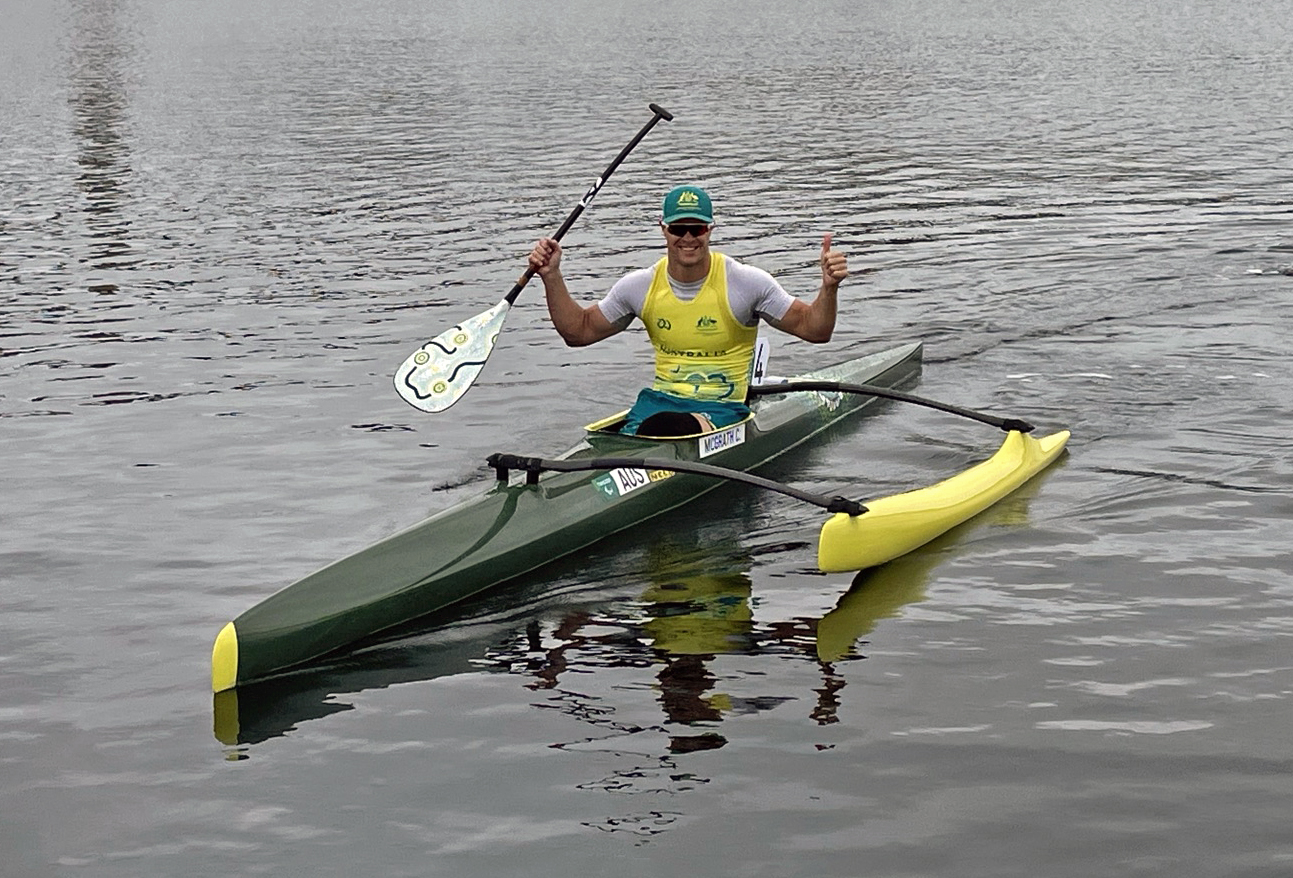
McGrath celebrating gold medal at Tokyo 2020 in Men's VL3 200m

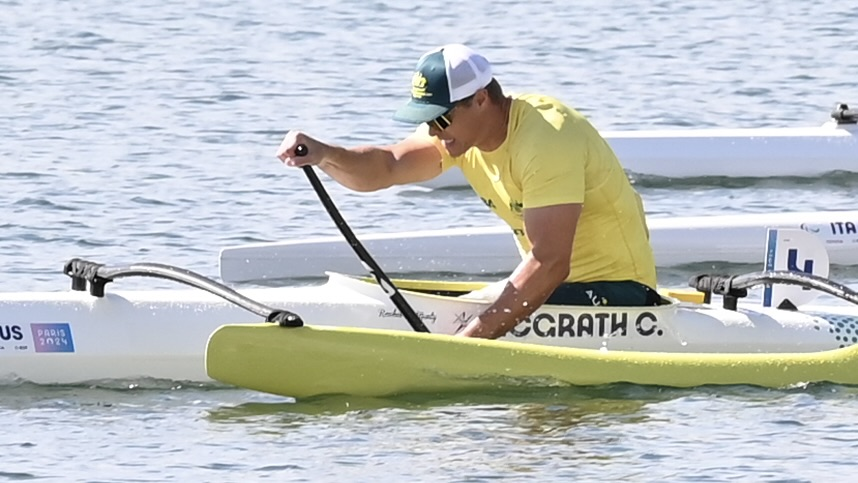
McGrath at Paris 2024

At the 2019 ICF Canoe Sprint World Championships in Szeged, Hungary, McGrath won gold medals in the Men's KL2 200m and Men's VL3 200m. At the 2020 Summer Paralympics, McGrath won gold in both the Men's KL2 and the Men's VL3. In the Men's KL2, McGrath came third in his Heat, and first in his Semi-Final. He won the final in a time of 41.426. In the Men's VL3 he was unbeatable in both his Heat and in the Final. His time in the Final was 50.537.

He was selected to compete at the 2024 Summer Paralympics in Paris, France. In the lead up to the Paralympics, McGrath won gold and bronze medals at the 2024 ICF World Para Canoe Championships in Szeged, Hungary. At the Paralympics, he won gold in the KL2.

McGrath lives on the Gold Coast, Queensland and trains on the water at Varsity Lakes. He was originally coached by Andrea King. In 2021, he was coached by Shaun Caven and Guy Power. McGrath is supported by Mates4Mates, branch of the RSL Queensland, a charity that provides support for injured ex-servicemen and women.

== Recognition ==
- 2014 – Sporting Wheelies and Disabled Association Most Improved Athlete of the Year
- 2014 – Australian Canoeing Paracanoeist of the Year
- 2014 – The Courier-Mail McDonald's Queensland Athlete with a Disability Award
- 2014 – Para Performance of the Year – presented by Dairy Australia (Nomination)
- 2015 – Australian Canoeing Paracanoeist of the Year
- 2016 – Flag bearer for the Australian team at the Rio Paralympics Closing Ceremony
- 2016 – Finalist for 'The Don Award' Sport Australia Hall of Fame awards
- 2016 – Australian Canoeing Paracanoeist of the Year
- 2016 – Australian Canoeist of The Year – Olympic/Paralympic Class
- 2016 – Queensland Academy of Sport Peter Lacey Award for Sporting Excellence
- 2017 – Medal of the Order of Australia
- 2017 – Sportsman of the Year at the World Paddle Awards – the first Paralympic athlete to win the award
- 2017 – Australian Canoeing Paracanoeist of the Year
- 2018 – Paddle Australia Paracanoeist of the Year
- 2018 – Queensland Sport Athlete with a Disability
- 2019 – Paddle Australia Paracanoeist of the Year
- 2019 – Australian Institute of Sport Awards – Male Para-athlete of the Year
- 2020 - Paralympics Australia Male Athlete of the Year
- 2021 - Queensland Sport Athlete with a Disability
- 2021 - Paddle Australia's 'Paddler of the Year Award with Jessica Fox
- 2023 - Australian Sports Medal
- 2023 - Paddle Australia's 'Paddler of the Year Award with Jessica Fox
- 2024 - Co-captain with Angie Ballard - Australian Team at the 2024 Paris Paralympics
- 2024 - Queensland Academy of Sport Athlete Award (voted by the athletes) and Paralympic Athlete of the Cycle
- 2026 - Paddle Australia Paracanoeist of the Year
