= 2016 European Canoe Sprint Olympic Qualifier =

The 2016 European Canoe Sprint Olympic Qualifier took place in Duisburg, Germany on 18 & 19 May 2016. It served as the sole Olympic qualification regatta for European sprint canoeists that did not claim Rio 2016 berths at the 2015 ICF Canoe Sprint World Championships.

This event shared the venue with, and was held concurrently with the 2016 ICF Paracanoe World Championships.

== Olympic qualification ==
Four athlete quota places were provided in the men's C2 1000m (two NOCs). For all other events, two athlete quota places were provided in each (two NOCs per single-man event, one NOC per double-man event).

== Medal summary ==
=== Men ===
Event	Gold	Silver	Bronze
C1 200 m	(Spain) Alfonso Benavides	(Georgia (country)) Zaza Nadiradze	(France) Thomas Simart
C1 1000 m	(Romania) Leonid Carp	(Italy) Carlo Tacchini	(Bulgaria) Angel Kodinov
C2 1000 m	Romania Leonid Carp; Stefan Andrei Strat	Czech Republic Jaroslav Radoň; Filip Dvořák	Moldova Oleg Tarnovschi; Oleg Nuta
K1 200 m	(Spain) Saúl Craviotto	(Hungary) Bence Horváth	(Italy) Manfredi Rizza
K1 1000 m	(Hungary) Bence Dombvári	(Russia) Roman Anoshkin	(Spain) Marcus Walz
K2 200 m	Spain Saúl Craviotto; Cristian Toro	Belarus Dzmitry Tratsiakou; Taras Valko	Italy Michele Bertolini; Riccardo Cecchini
K2 1000 m	Hungary Tibor Hufnagel; Bence Dombvári	Ukraine Oleg Kukharyk; Vitaliy Tsurkan	Spain Gabriel Campo; Ruben Millan

=== Women ===
Event	Gold	Silver	Bronze
K1 200 m	(Germany) Sabine Volz	(Sweden) Linnea Stensils	(Slovakia) Martina Kohlova
K1 500 m	(Germany) Sabrina Hering	(Slovakia) Martina Kohlova	(Austria) Yvonne Schuring
K2 500 m	Sweden Karin Johansson; Sofia Paldanius	Austria Ana Roxana Lehaci; Viktoria Schwarz	(United Kingdom) Great Britain Lani Belcher; Angela Hannah

== Medal table ==
Rank	Nation	Gold	Silver	Bronze	Total
1	Spain (ESP)	3	0	2	5
2	Hungary (HUN)	2	1	0	3
3	Germany (GER)	2	0	0	2
3	Romania (ROU)	2	0	0	2
5	Sweden (SWE)	1	1	0	2
6	Italy (ITA)	0	1	2	3
7	Austria (AUT)	0	1	1	2
7	Slovakia (SVK)	0	1	1	2
9	Belarus (BLR)	0	1	0	1
9	Czech Republic (CZE)	0	1	0	1
9	Georgia (GEO)	0	1	0	1
9	Russia (RUS)	0	1	0	1
9	Ukraine (UKR)	0	1	0	1
14	Bulgaria (BUL)	0	0	1	1
14	France (FRA)	0	0	1	1
14	Great Britain (GBR)	0	0	1	1
14	Moldova (MDA)	0	0	1	1
Totals (17 entries)		10	10	10	30
