= Canoeing at the 2016 Summer Olympics – Qualification =

This article details the canoeing at the 2016 Summer Olympics qualifying phase. Similar to 2012 format, a qualification system has been set up for both slalom and sprint canoeing at these games. The quotas have already been set for each event by the International Canoe Federation in August 2014.

== Summary ==
NOC	Slalom				Sprint												Total	
NOC	K1 M	C1 M	C2 M	K1 W	Men								Women				Boats	Athletes
NOC	K1 M	C1 M	C2 M	K1 W	K1 200	K1 1000	K2 200	K2 1000	K4 1000	C1 200	C1 1000	C2 1000	K1 200	K1 500	K2 500	K4 500	Boats	Athletes
Argentina		X			X				X							X	4	10
Australia	X	X		X	X	X	X	X	X			X		X	X		11	18
Austria	X			X													2	2
Azerbaijan	X									X			X	X			4	4
Belgium						X											1	1
Brazil	X	X	X	X		X				X		X		X			8	10
Bulgaria						X					X						2	2
Canada	X	X			X	X	X				X		X	X	X	X	10	11
China	X	X		X						X	X			X	X	X	8	10
Cook Islands	X			X													2	2
Cuba					X			X				X	X				4	6
Czech Republic	X	X	X	X	X	X			X		X	X					9	12
Denmark						X									X	X	3	5
Ecuador					X												1	1
Egypt					X								X				2	2
France	X	X	X	X	X	X	X	X	X	X	X		X			X	13	17
Georgia										X							1	1
Germany	X	X	X	X		X	X	X			X			X	X	X	11	16
Great Britain	X	X	X	X			X							X	X	X	8	13
Hungary					X	X	X	X	X	X	X	X	X	X	X	X	12	18
Italy	X			X	X			X	X		X						4	4
Japan	X	X	X	X													4	5
Kazakhstan				X	X			X	X	X			X	X	X		8	13
Latvia					X						X						2	2
Lebanon		X															1	1
Lithuania					X		X	X		X							4	6
Moldova											X						1	1
Morocco				X													1	1
Mexico										X							1	1
Mozambique												X					1	2
New Zealand	X			X		X					X		X	X		X	7	9
Nigeria	X																1	1
Palau														X			1	1
Poland	X	X	X	X	X						X	X	X	X	X	X	11	14
Portugal						X			X	X			X	X			5	7
Russia	X	X	X	X	X	X			X	X	X	X	X		X		12	17
Samoa													X				1	1
São Tomé and Príncipe											X						1	1
Senegal		X															1	1
Serbia					X	X	X	X					X		X	X	7	10
Slovakia	X	X	X	X		X		X	X					X			8	12
Slovenia	X	X	X	X									X	X			6	6
South Africa														X			1	1
South Korea							X										1	2
Spain		X		X	X	X	X		X	X			X				8	11
Sweden	X				X								X		X		4	5
Tunisia						X				X				X			3	3
Turkey													X				1	1
Ukraine				X						X	X	X				X	5	9
United States	X	X	X	X										X			5	6
Uzbekistan						X					X	X	X				4	4
Total: 51 NOCs	21	15	10	19	12	12	7	7	11	10	9	8	14	14	9	12	179	314

== Slalom ==
For the slalom events, the men competed in C-1, C-2, and K-1. Women competed in K-1 only. Qualifications were allocated to NOCs, not to specific competitors. NOCs were limited to one boat per event. Qualification spots were earned as follows:

- World Championships: The top placed boats (considering only one boat per NOC) earned their NOCs a qualification. 15 qualification spots were available in the K-1 events, 10 in the C-1, and 8 boats (16 athletes) in the C-2.
- Continental Qualification Events: Only NOCs that did not earn qualification in a given event through the World Championships were eligible. For the K-1 and C-1 events, 1 qualification spot was available for each continent. For the C-2 event, only 3 total qualification spots were available; these were assigned to continents based on World Championship results: the best ranked non-qualifying NOCs from three different continents at the World Championships earned their continent one boat qualification place.
- Host country: Brazil, as the host country, was guaranteed one entry in each event if not already qualified.
- Tripartite Commission: Canoeing (both slalom and sprint) had a total of 2 qualification spots that would be awarded through Tripartite Commission invitations.
- Reallocation: Unused quota spots were reallocated. In practice, this was used where one of an NOC's C-2 competitors also competed in the C-1 event, freeing up the athlete quota spot that NOC had earned in the C-1.

=== Timeline ===
Event	Date	Venue
2015 Pan American Games	July 18–19, 2015	Toronto, Canada
2015 ICF Canoe Slalom World Championships	September 16–20, 2015	(United Kingdom) Lee Valley, Great Britain
2015 African Canoeing Championships	November 6–8, 2015	Sagana, Kenya
2016 Oceania Canoeing Championships	February 19–21, 2016	Penrith, Australia
2016 Asian Canoe Slalom Championships	April 23–24, 2016	Toyama, Japan
2016 European Canoe Slalom Championships	May 13–15, 2016	Liptovský Mikuláš, Slovakia

=== Qualification table ===
Event	Men's K-1	Men's C-1	Men's C-2	Women's K-1
Host nation	Brazil	Brazil	Brazil	—
2015 World Championships	Czech Republic; Slovenia; Germany; Italy; United States; Poland; France; Azerbaijan; Russia; Great Britain; Japan; Austria; Slovakia; New Zealand; Australia; Cook Islands*	Slovakia; Slovenia; Great Britain; Germany; France; Poland; Japan; Russia; Czech Republic; United States	Great Britain; Poland; Germany; Slovenia; France; Slovakia; Russia; Czech Republic	Spain; Australia; Germany; Czech Republic; Great Britain; Slovakia; New Zealand; China; Brazil; Austria; France; Russia; Slovenia; Poland; Japan; Cook Islands*
2015 Pan American Games	Canada	Canada	United States	~~Canada~~**; United States
2015 African Championships	Nigeria	Senegal	—	Morocco
2016 Oceania Championships	—	Australia	—	—
2016 Asian Championships	China	China	Japan	Kazakhstan
2016 European Championships	~~Netherlands~~; Sweden	Spain	Switzerland	Ukraine
Tripartite Invitation	—	Lebanon	—	—
Reallocation	—	Argentina; Portugal	—	Italy
Total	21	19	12	21

Italic: National federation has qualified a boat but the athlete that did this was already counted in another boat
* No continental qualifying race held as less than three nations are eligible.
** National federation is limited to two athlete quota places at a continental qualifying event.

== Sprint ==
NOCs are limited to one boat per event, and in kayaking to 8 men and 6 women positions. Qualification enables an NOC to participate, not necessarily in the person of the paddler who gained the place. Quotas given are for boats.F Qualification spots were earned as follows:

- World Championships: The top placed boats (considering only one boat per NOC) earned their NOCs a qualification. 8 boat qualification spots were available in the K-1 events (1 of which was reserved for the host country in the men's 1000 metre and women's 500 metre events), 6 in the K-2 events, 10 in the K-4 events, 7 in the C-1 events (1 of which was reserved for the host country in the 1000 metre event), and 6 in the C-2 event.
- Continental Qualification Events: Only NOCs that did not earn qualification in a given event through the World Championships were eligible. For the K-1, C-1, and C-2 events, 1 boat qualification spot was available for each continent (except that Europe received 2 spots). For the K-2 events, Europe was guaranteed a boat qualification spot but only 3 total qualification spots were available for the remaining 4 continents; these were assigned to continents based on World Championship results: the best ranked non-qualifying NOCs from three different continents at the World Championships earned their continent one boat qualification place.
- Host country: Brazil, as the host country, was guaranteed entries in certain events as listed in the World Championship section.
- Tripartite Commission: Canoeing (both slalom and sprint) had a total of 2 qualification spots that would be awarded through Tripartite Commission invitations.
- Reallocation: Unused quota spots were reallocated. In practice, this was used where some of an NOC's competitors in a larger boat category also competed in a smaller category, freeing up the athlete quota spot that NOC had earned in the smaller category.

=== Timeline ===
Event	Date	Venue
2015 ICF Canoe Sprint World Championships	August 19–23, 2015	Milan, Italy
2015 Asian Canoe Sprint Championships	November 4–7, 2015	Palembang, Indonesia
2016 Oceania Canoeing Championships	February 12–14, 2016	Adelaide, Australia
2016 African Sprint Qualifier	March 29 – April 2, 2016	Pretoria, South Africa
2016 European Sprint Qualifier	May 18–19, 2016	Duisburg, Germany
2016 Pan American Sprint Qualifier	May 19–20, 2016	Gainesville, United States

=== Qualification table ===
Event	2015 World Championships	Continental qualification					Total
Men Kayak	2015 World Championships	Europe	Americas	Asia	Africa	Oceania	Total
K-1 200 m	Canada; France; Sweden; Lithuania; Russia; Ecuador; Poland; Czech Republic; Argentina; Serbia	Spain; Italy; Latvia	Brazil; Cuba	Kazakhstan	~~South Africa~~; Egypt	Australia	14
K-1 1000 m	Denmark; Czech Republic; Portugal; Germany; ~~Belarus~~; Australia; Bulgaria; Slovakia; Serbia; Belgium^	Hungary; Russia; Spain	Canada	Uzbekistan	Tunisia	New Zealand	14
K-2 200 m	Hungary; ~~Russia~~∞ Serbia; France; Great Britain; Germany; Lithuania^ Canada	Spain	Brazil	South Korea	—	Australia	10
K-2 1000 m	Germany; Australia; Serbia; Slovakia; ~~Belarus~~Δ; France; Lithuania^	Hungary	Cuba	Kazakhstan	—	—	10
K-4 1000 m	Argentina; ~~Belarus~~Δ; Czech Republic; Australia; Hungary; Kazakhstan; Portugal; ~~Romania~~; Russiaº; Slovakia; Spain	—	—	—	—	—	11
Event	2015 World Championships	Continental qualification					Total
Men Canoe	2015 World Championships	Europe	Americas	Asia	Africa	Oceania	Total
C-1 200 m	~~Belarus~~; China; Brazil; ~~Russia~~∞ Lithuania; Azerbaijan; Hungary; Portugal; Ukraine^	Spain; Georgia	Mexico	Kazakhstan; Iran	Tunisia	~~Cook Islands~~	13
C-1 1000 m	Germany; Czech Republic; Moldova; Ukraine; Russia; Poland; Hungary; France^	Latvia; Italy; Bulgaria	Canada	Uzbekistan; China	São Tomé and Príncipe	~~New Zealand~~	13
C-2 1000 m	Brazil; Hungary; Poland; Ukraine; Russia; ~~Belarus~~Δ	~~Romania~~Δ; Czech Republic; Moldova	Cuba	Uzbekistan	Mozambique	Australia	12
Event	2015 World Championships	Continental qualification					Total
Women	2015 World Championships	Europe	Americas	Asia	Africa	Oceania	Total
K-1 200 m	New Zealand; Poland; Spain; Azerbaijan; Cuba; ~~Russia~~∞ France; Kazakhstan; Hungary; Serbia; Slovenia; Turkey	Germany; Sweden; Slovakia; Portugal; Austria	Canada	Uzbekistan	Egypt	Samoa	14
K-1 500 m	New Zealand; Hungary; China; Poland; Azerbaijan; Slovenia; Belarus; Great Britain; Portugal; South Africa; Canada; Brazil^{*}	Germany; Slovakia	United States	Kazakhstan	Tunisia	Australia; Palau^{TR}	15
K-2 500 m	Hungary; Serbia; Germany; Poland; ~~Russia~~∞ China; Denmark; ~~Romania^~~Δ; Great Britain	Sweden; Austria	Canada	Kazakhstan	—	Australia	10
K-4 500 m	Argentina; Belarus; Canada*; China; Denmark^ France^ Germany; Great Britain; Hungary; New Zealand; Poland; Serbia; Ukraine	—	—	—	—	—	11

^* Host quota
- Italic: National federation has qualified a boat but the athlete that did this was already counted in another boat
- ^{TR}: National federation has received an invitation from the Tripartite Commission
- ^: ICF decided that some of the events in Africa and Oceania needed to be reattributed to the World Championships lists because the events seen as invalid due to lack of eligible competitors.
- º: ICF decided that two quota places were combined and reallocated to the next best ranked NOC not qualified in a larger boat category, should they be available from team boats in the same gender and category.
- Δ: On July 16, 2016, the ICF bans Romania and Belarus sprint teams for a year due to systemic doping.
- ^{∞} On July 25, the ICF revoked four entries held by Russia, as a response to the previous doping bans and to the implications in the 'disappearing positive methodology' set out in the McClaren Report on the nation's state-sponsored doping.
- *: Canada qualified a composite boat, as it qualified four athlete quotas in the other three women's kayak events.
