= Canoe at the 2020 Summer Paralympics =

Canoe at the XVI Paralympic Games
- Canoe pictogram of the 2020 Summer Paralympics
- Venue: Sea Forest Waterway
- Dates: 2–4 September 2021
- Competitors: 91 in 9 events

Canoe at the 2020 Summer Paralympics in Tokyo, Japan took place at the Sea Forest Waterway, the same location where the rowing took place. This was the second appearance of Para canoe in the Paralympic Games and the debut of all three va'a events.

The 2020 Summer Olympic and Paralympic Games were postponed to 2021 due to the COVID-19 pandemic. They kept the 2020 name and were held from 24 August to 5 September 2021.

== Qualification ==
A total of 91 athletes qualified for canoe at the 2020 Summer Paralympics. Each NPC could enter a maximum of 9 athletes (one qualification spot per event); however, an athlete could enter both kayak and va'a events in their assigned categories as long as they contested those events in one of the competitions mentioned below. Qualification spots were allocated through one of the following methods:

- The 6 top ranked athletes in each Paralympic event at the 2019 ICF Canoe Sprint World Championships obtain one qualification spot for their NPC.
- The 4 top ranked athletes not already qualified (as above) in each Paralympic event at the 2021 ICF Paracanoe World Cup obtain one qualification spot for their NPC.
  - If the host country hasn't qualified any athletes at a male kayak, male va'a, female kayak or female va'a event, one spot is taken from the 2021 World Cup quota and allocated to the event where an athlete from that country achieved the best rank.
  - At least three continents must be represented in each event. If this minimum is not reached, spots are taken from the 2021 World Cup quota and given to the NPC of the best ranked athlete from a different continent.
  - If there aren't enough NPCs eligible at the 2021 World Cup in a given event, the corresponding 2019 World Championships rank is used to fill the remaining spots.

== Competition schedule ==
Legend
H	Heats	½	Semifinals	F	Final

Schedule
Event ↓ \ Date →	Sep 2	Sep 3		Sep 4	
Men's KL1	H	½	F		
Men's KL2	H	½	F		
Men's KL3	H	½	F		
Men's VL2	H			½	F
Men's VL3	H			½	F
Women's KL1	H			½	F
Women's KL2	H			½	F
Women's KL3	H			½	F
Women's VL2	H	½	F		

== Participating nations ==
Qualification slots are allocated as follows:

NPC	Men					Women				Total
NPC	KL1	KL2	KL3	VL2	VL3	KL1	KL2	KL3	VL2	Total
Argentina	Yes				Yes					2
Australia			Yes		Yes			Yes	Yes	4
Austria		Yes								1
Belarus				Yes						1
Brazil		Yes	Yes	Yes	Yes	Yes		Yes	Yes	7
Canada				Yes			Yes		Yes	3
Chile						Yes				1
China	Yes					Yes	Yes			3
France	Yes				Yes			Yes		3
Germany			Yes			Yes	Yes	Yes	Yes	5
Great Britain	Yes	Yes	Yes		Yes	Yes	Yes	Yes	Yes	8
Hungary	Yes	Yes	Yes	Yes		Yes	Yes			6
India									Yes	1
Iran				Yes				Yes		2
Ireland					Yes					1
Israel							Yes			1
Italy	Yes	Yes				Yes			Yes	4
Japan	Yes	Yes			Yes	Yes		Yes	Yes	6
Kazakhstan		Yes								1
New Zealand		Yes	Yes							2
Poland			Yes	Yes			Yes	Yes		4
Portugal	Yes			Yes						2
RPC	Yes		Yes	Yes	Yes	Yes	Yes		Yes	7
Spain	Yes		Yes	Yes	Yes		Yes			5
Sweden								Yes		1
Ukraine		Yes	Yes			Yes	Yes			4
United States				Yes					Yes	2
Uzbekistan		Yes			Yes			Yes		3
Total: 28 NPCs	10	10	10	10	10	10	10	10	10	90

== Medal table ==
Rank	Nation	Gold	Silver	Bronze	Total
1	Great Britain (GBR)	3	1	3	7
2	Australia (AUS)	2	1	0	3
3	Brazil (BRA)	1	2	0	3
3	Ukraine (UKR)	1	2	0	3
5	Germany (GER)	1	0	1	2
5	Hungary (HUN)	1	0	1	2
7	France (FRA)	0	1	1	2
8	RPC (RPC)	0	1	0	1
8	United States (USA)	0	1	0	1
10	Chile (CHI)	0	0	1	1
10	Italy (ITA)	0	0	1	1
10	Portugal (POR)	0	0	1	1
Totals (12 entries)		9	9	9	27

== Medalists ==
Event	Class	Gold	Silver	Bronze
Men's kayak	KL1	Péter Pál Kiss; Hungary	Luis Cardoso da Silva; Brazil	Rémy Boullé; France
Men's kayak	KL2	Curtis McGrath; Australia	Mykola Syniuk; Ukraine	Federico Mancarella; Italy
Men's kayak	KL3	Serhii Yemelianov; Ukraine	Leonid Krylov; RPC	Robert Oliver; Great Britain
Men's va'a	VL2	Fernando Rufino de Paulo; Brazil	Steven Haxton; United States	Norberto Mourão; Portugal
Men's va'a	VL3	Curtis McGrath; Australia	Giovane Vieira de Paula; Brazil	Stuart Wood; Great Britain
Women's kayak	KL1	Edina Müller; Germany	Maryna Mazhula; Ukraine	Katherinne Wollermann; Chile
Women's kayak	KL2	Charlotte Henshaw; Great Britain	Emma Wiggs; Great Britain	Katalin Varga; Hungary
Women's kayak	KL3	Laura Sugar; Great Britain	Nélia Barbosa; France	Felicia Laberer; Germany
Women's va'a	VL2	Emma Wiggs; Great Britain	Susan Seipel; Australia	Jeanette Chippington; Great Britain

== See also ==
- Canoeing at the 2020 Summer Olympics
