= Sam Scowen =

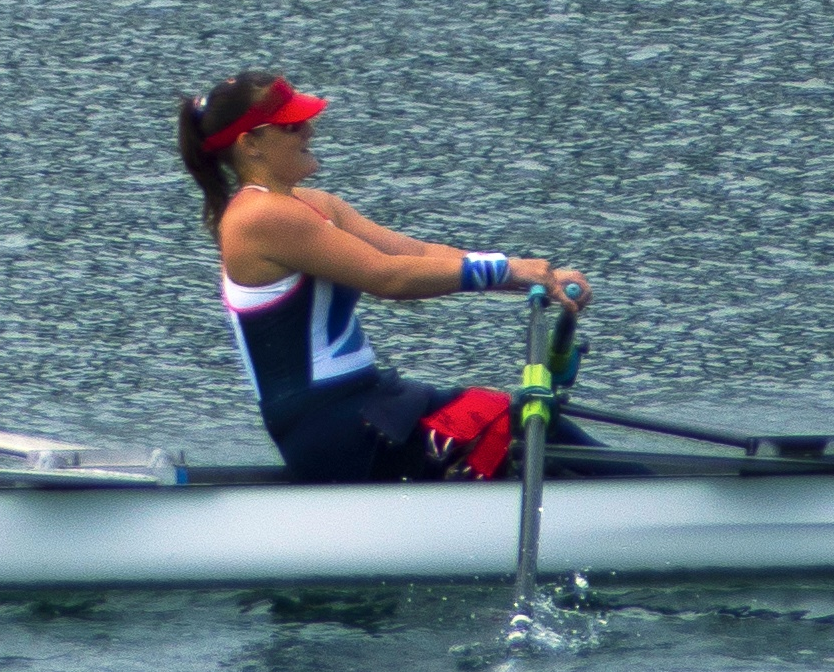
- Sam Scowen competing at the 2012 Summer Paralympics in London

Personal information
- Full name: Samantha Scowen
- Nationality: British
- Born: 29 October 1987 (age 38)died 16/01/2025 Reading, Berkshire

Sport
- Country: United Kingdom
Medal record
Representing Great Britain
Event	1st	2nd	3rd
World Rowing Cup	1		1
Varese International Regatta		1	1
Rowing
World Rowing Cup
Gold medal – first place	2009 Munich	Adaptive mixed double scull
Bronze medal – third place	2011 Munich	Adaptive mixed double scull
Varese International Regatta
Silver medal – second place	2009 Lake Varese	Trunk and Arms mixed Double Scull
Bronze medal – third place	2009 Lake Varese	Trunk and Arms mixed Double Scull

Samantha "Sam" Scowen (born 29 October 1987) is a British paracanoeist and former adaptive rower who competed at the 2012 Summer Paralympics in London. She competed in the mixed scull with partner Nick Beighton. She is currently a member GB ParaCanoe competing in the KL3 category.

== History ==
Scowen was born in 1987, growing up in Wokingham. Born with a missing growth plate in her right leg and an under developed hip socket, Scowen has undergone intensive surgery including six leg lengthenings.

She first tried rowing in 2008 and later joined the Dorney Boat Club. She teamed up with James Roberts in the TA mixed double scull and in May 2009 they took a gold medal in the World Rowing Cup in Munich. In August 2009 she competed in the World Rowing Championships in Poland, racing in the adaptive TA mixed double where she and partner Roberts finished 5th. Despite this success, the partnership was split when a change in disability classifications meant that Roberts was no longer able to compete. With no other partner available, Scowen was unable to compete in 2010.

In 2011, rowing newcomer Captain Nick Beighton of the British Army joined Scowen as her new sporting partner. The two competed in the TA mixed Double Scull at the world cup in Munich. They finished third to take the bronze. In August Scowen travelled to Slovenia to take part in the 2011 World Rowing Championships, she and Beighton finished 6th. In 2011, she and Beighton were the first rowers to qualify for the 2012 Summer Paralympics in London. They finished fourth, on the losing end of a photo finish for the bronze medal.
