= Nick Beighton =

British Para rower and Para canoeist (born 1981)

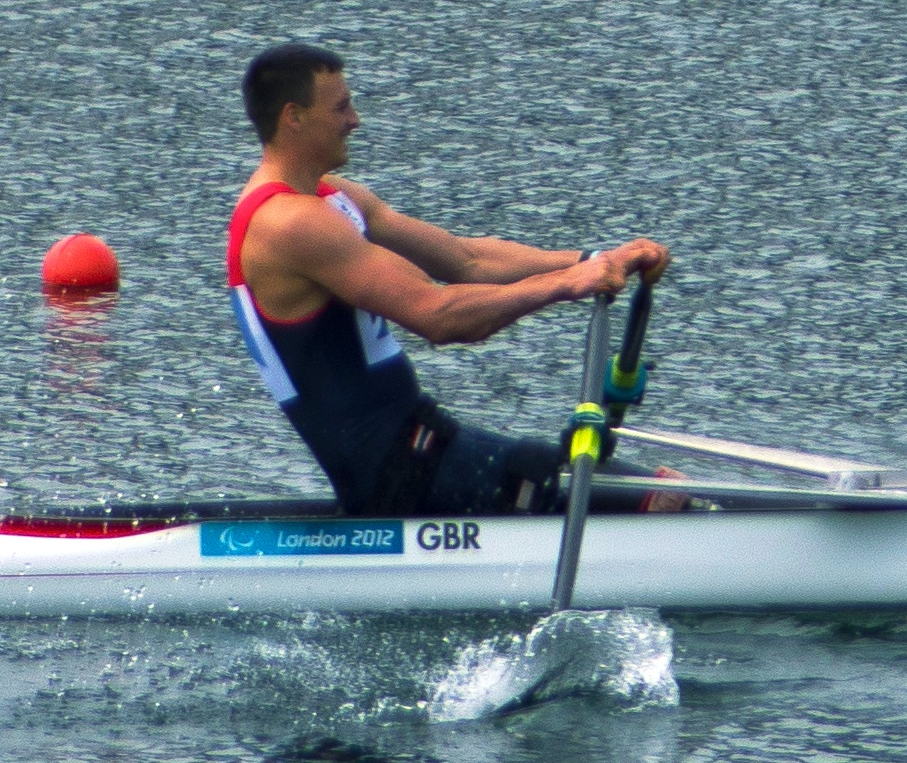
- Beighton competing at the 2012 Paralympics

Personal information
- Full name: Nicholas Beighton
- Born: 29 September 1981 (age 44) Stockport, England

Sport
- Country: Great Britain
- Sport: Para canoe, Para rowing
- Disability class: KL2 (Para canoe)
Medal record
Representing Great Britain
Men's Para canoe
Paralympic Games
Bronze medal – third place	2016 Rio de Janeiro	KL2
World Championships
Bronze medal – third place	2016 Duisburg	KL2
Men's Para rowing
World Rowing Cup
Bronze medal – third place	2011 Munich	Adaptive mixed double scull

Nicholas Beighton (born 29 September 1981) is a British Para canoeist and former British Army officer. Beighton took up Para rowing as part of the rehabilitation programme after losing his legs during active service. He competed in the mixed scull with partner Samantha Scowen at the 2012 Summer Paralympics in London. He subsequently switched to the Para canoe discipline and won the bronze medal in the Men's KL2 canoe sprint at the 2016 Summer Paralympics in Rio de Janeiro.

== Early life and education ==
Beighton was born in Stockport, England in 1981. At the age of seven his family moved to Shrewsbury where he attended Meole Brace School and later Shrewsbury Sixth Form College before matriculating to Sheffield University.

== Career ==
=== Military service ===
Beighton joined the British Army and undertook his officer training at the Royal Military Academy Sandhurst. On 16 December 2000, he was commissioned into the Royal Engineers as a lieutenant with seniority from 13 December 2005. He was promoted to captain on 16 June 2009.

In October 2009, while on patrol in Helmand Province in Afghanistan, Beighton stood on an improvised explosive device. His life was saved by an Army Medic, who kept him stable before being taken to medical facilities in Camp Bastion. Beighton was placed in a medically induced coma and required 36 pints of blood during his initial treatment. Although his life was saved he lost both his legs in the attack.

=== Sporting career ===
In February 2010, Beighton attended a Paralympic talent identification day at Brunel University. It was there that he became aware that the British Paralympic squad were looking for a male Trunk and Arms rower. He first sculled in July 2010 at Guildford Rowing Club as part of the rehabilitation programme at the Defence Medical Rehabilitation Centre. In April 2011, Beighton joined the Great Britain rowing team, and in May he was paired with Sam Scowen in the TA mixed Double Scull at the world cup in Munich. They finished third to take the bronze. In August, Beighton travelled to Slovenia to compete in the 2011 World Rowing Championships, where he and Scowen finished 6th. In 2011, Beighton and Scowen were the first rowers to qualify for the 2012 Summer Paralympics in London. They finished fourth at the London 2012 Paralympics, on the losing end of a photo finish for the bronze medal.

Beighton subsequently became a member of the British paracanoe squad and competed at the 2016 Summer Paralympics in Rio de Janeiro where he won the bronze medal in the Men's KL2 canoe sprint.
