= 2016 ICF Paracanoe World Championships =

International canoe competition

- Location: Duisburg, Germany
- Start date: 17 May
- End date: 19 May

The 2016 ICF Paracanoe World Championships was held in Duisburg, Germany, from 17 to 19 May 2016. This event, which is usually part of the ICF Canoe Sprint World Championships, was held separately as the latter is not held in Olympic years. It shared the venue with, and was held concurrently with the 2016 European Canoe Sprint Olympic Qualifier tournament.

== Explanation of events ==
Paracanoe competitions are contested in either a va'a (V), an outrigger canoe (which includes a second pontoon) with a single-blade paddle, or in a kayak (K), a closed canoe with a double-bladed paddle. All international competitions are held over 200 metres in single-man boats, with three event classes in both types of vessel for men and women depending on the level of an athlete's impairment. The lower the classification number, the more severe the impairment is - for example, VL1 is a va'a competition for those with particularly severe impairments.

== Paralympic qualification ==
In kayak events only, the top four nations that had not previously earned Paralympic qualification in the 2015 ICF Canoe Sprint World Championships claimed quota slots for the regatta at Rio 2016.

== Medal summary ==
=== Medal table ===
Rank	Nation	Gold	Silver	Bronze	Total
1	Australia	3	1	1	5
2	Great Britain	2	2	2	6
3	Brazil	2	1	1	4
4	Germany	2	0	0	2
5	Italy	1	0	1	2
5	United States	1	0	1	2
7	China	1	0	0	1
8	Russia	0	2	3	5
9	Japan	0	1	1	2
9	Poland	0	1	1	2
11	Austria	0	1	0	1
11	Hungary	0	1	0	1
11	Spain	0	1	0	1
11	Ukraine	0	1	0	1
15	Romania	0	0	1	1
Totals (15 entries)		12	12	12	36

=== Medal events ===
Non-Paralympic classes

Event	Gold		Silver		Bronze	
Men's KL1	Yu Xiaowei; China	50.596	Jakub Tokarz; Poland	50.855	Luis Carlos Cardoso da Silva; Brazil	52.233
Men's KL2	Curtis McGrath; Australia	42.043	Markus Swoboda; Austria	43.068	Nick Beighton; Great Britain	44.572
Men's KL3	Tom Kierey; Germany	40.430	Serhii Yemelianov; Ukraine	40.474	Leonid Krylov; Russia	40.636
Men's VL1	Luis Carlos Cardoso da Silva; Brazil	56.539	Róbert Suba; Hungary	58.718	Jakub Tokarz; Poland	01:01.814
Men's VL2	Curtis McGrath; Australia	51.267	Javier Reja Muñoz; Spain	53.909	Giuseppe de Lelio; Italy	56.226
Men's VL3	Pier Alberto Buccoliero; Italy	51.473	Aleksei Egorov; Russia	52.086	Martin Tweedie; Great Britain	52.383
Women's KL1	Edina Müller; Germany	56.846	Jeanette Chippington; Great Britain	57.037	Alexandra Dupik; Russia	58.209
Women's KL2	Emma Wiggs; Great Britain	53.691	Nicola Paterson; Great Britain	56.533	Susan Seipel; Australia	57.032
Women's KL3	Anne Dickins; Great Britain	51.246	Amanda Reynolds; Australia	51.686	Mihaela Lulea; Romania	52.525
Women's VL1	Ann Yoshida; United States	1:18.730	Akiko Nakajima; Japan	1:20.718	Monika Seryu; Japan	1:26.215
Women's VL2	Susan Seipel; Australia	1:02.960	Debora Benevides; Brazil	1:03.519	Nadezda Andreeva; Russia	1:05.909
Women's VL3	Aline Souza Lopes; Brazil	1:01.279	Larisa Volik; Russia	1:01.544	Anja Pierce; United States	1:03.258
