= Canoe at the 2016 Summer Paralympics =

Canoe at the XV Paralympic Games
- Venue: Lagoa Rodrigo de Freitas
- Dates: 14–15 September 2016
- Competitors: 104

Canoe at the 2016 Summer Paralympics was held in Rio de Janeiro in September 2016, with a maximum of 60 athletes (30 men, 30 women) competing in six sprint style events. This was the first appearance for Para canoe in the Paralympic Games.

== Background to inclusion ==
In 2009, the International Canoe Federation (ICF) began a programme to make the sport accessible to everyone, with the explicit aim of including it in the Paralympic Games for the first time in Rio. In 2010, 31 countries sent participants to the ICF Canoe Sprint World Championships in Poland. That same year, the sport’s inclusion in the Rio 2016 Paralympic Games was approved.

In the Paralympic Games, only kayaks, identified by the letter K, are used, and only flatwater sprint events are held. Each boat is adapted according to the functional abilities of its crew members. Athletes with any type of physical-motor disability may participate in competitions.

== Classification ==
The Olympic and Paralympic versions have similar rules, with the fastest canoeist winning. The competition format features direct classification to the finals and repechage heats to decide which athletes will take part in the final race, in which medals are won.

There are three functional classes: L3, where athletes use their legs, trunk and arms to help paddling; L2, in which athletes use only their trunk and arms; and K1, in which athletes only use their arms. Events are always held along straight line courses marked by buoys, 200 metres long. There are both men’s and women’s races, with events for individuals.

== Qualification ==
An NPC can be allocated a maximum of one qualification slot per medal event. An NPC can obtain a maximum of three male and three female slots. There must be a minimum of three continents represented in each medal event at the Rio 2016 Paralympic Games.

Qualification slots will be allocated as follows:

Qualification for canoe at the 2016 Summer Paralympics
Qualification Event	Men			Women		
Qualification Event	MKL1	MKL2	MKL3	WKL1	WKL2	WKL3
2015 ICF Canoe Sprint World Championships Milan, Italy	Italy; Argentina; Brazil; China; Australia; Poland	Austria; Australia; Brazil; Italy; Great Britain; Slovenia	Germany; Great Britain; ~~Russia~~; Romania; Ukraine; Poland	Great Britain; Germany; Ukraine; United States; Hungary; France	Great Britain; Australia; Ukraine; Hungary; Canada; Israel	Australia; Great Britain; France; Romania; Italy; Iran
2016 ICF Paracanoe World Championships Duisburg, Germany	Great Britain; South Africa; Hungary; France	Germany; Ukraine; Hungary; Spain	France; Ireland; Australia; Brazil	Chile; Australia; France; Japan	~~Russia~~; China; United States; Brazil	Canada; Brazil; United States; Sweden
Totals	10	10	10	10	10	10

== Medal summary ==
=== Medal table ===
* Host nation (Brazil)

Rank	Nation	Gold	Silver	Bronze	Total
1	Great Britain	3	0	2	5
2	Australia	1	1	1	3
3	Ukraine	1	1	0	2
4	Poland	1	0	1	2
5	Germany	0	2	0	2
6	Austria	0	1	0	1
6	Hungary	0	1	0	1
8	Brazil*	0	0	1	1
8	France	0	0	1	1
Totals (9 entries)		6	6	6	18

=== Medalists ===
Event	Gold	Silver	Bronze
Men's KL1	Jakub Tokarz; Poland	Robert Suba; Hungary	Ian Marsden; Great Britain
Men's KL2	Curtis McGrath; Australia	Markus Swoboda; Austria	Nick Beighton; Great Britain
Men's KL3	Serhii Yemelianov; Ukraine	Tom Kierey; Germany	Caio Ribeiro de Carvalho; Brazil
Women's KL1	Jeanette Chippington; Great Britain	Edina Muller; Germany	Kamila Kubas; Poland
Women's KL2	Emma Wiggs; Great Britain	Nataliia Lagutenko; Ukraine	Susan Seipel; Australia
Women's KL3	Anne Dickins; Great Britain	Amanda Reynolds; Australia	Cindy Moreau; France
