= Dejan Fabčič =

Slovenian Paralympic archer (born 1977)

Personal information
- Nationality: Slovenian
- Born: 16 September 1977 (age 48)

Sport
- Country: Slovenia
- Sport: Paralympic archery
- Event: Recurve bow
Medal record
Archery
Representing Slovenia
Paralympic Games
Bronze medal – third place	2024 Paris	Mixed team recurve open

Dejan Fabčič (born 16 September 1977) is a Slovenian para-archer.

== Career ==
Fabčič represented Slovenia at the 2008 Summer Paralympics in para swimming and at the 2016 Summer Paralympics in paracanoe. He served as the flag bearer for Slovenia during the 2020 Summer Paralympics Parade of Nations.

Fabčič represented Slovenia at the 2024 Summer Paralympics and won a bronze medal in the mixed team recurve open event, along with Živa Lavrinc.
