= Federico Mancarella =

Italian Para canoeist (born 1992)

Personal information
- Born: 4 September 1992 (age 34) Bologna, Italy

Sport
- Country: Italy
- Sport: Para canoe
- Disability: Spina bifida
- Disability class: KL2
- Club: Canoa Club Bologna
- Coached by: Gianni Anderlini; Stefano Porcu
Medal record
Men's Para canoe
Representing Italy
Paralympic Games
Bronze medal – third place	2020 Tokyo	KL2
World Championships
Silver medal – second place	2021 Copenhagen	KL2
Silver medal – second place	2019 Szeged	KL2
Bronze medal – third place	2023 Duisburg	KL2
European Championships
Gold medal – first place	2022 Munich	KL2
Silver medal – second place	2016 Moscow	KL2
Bronze medal – third place	2019 Poznań	KL2
Bronze medal – third place	2021 Poznań	KL2

Federico Mancarella (born 4 September 1992) is an Italian Para canoeist. He represents Italy in elite international competitions.

== Career ==
Mancarella represented Italy at the 2016 Summer Paralympics in the men's KL2 event and finished in fifth place with a time of 45.596.

Mancarella again represented Italy at the 2020 Summer Paralympics in the men's KL2 event and won a bronze.
