= Mykola Syniuk =

Ukrainian Para canoeist (born 1988)

Personal information
- Nationality: Ukrainian
- Born: 19 April 1988 (age 38)

Sport
- Country: Ukraine
- Sport: Para canoe
- Disability class: KL2
- Club: Invasport
- Coached by: Vyacheslav Zagreba; Leonid Kamlochuk
Medal record
Men's Para canoe
Representing Ukraine
Paralympic Games
Silver medal – second place	2020 Tokyo	KL2
Bronze medal – third place	2024 Paris	KL2
World Championships
Gold medal – first place	2021 Copenhagen	KL2
Gold medal – first place	2022 Dartmouth	KL2
Silver medal – second place	2023 Duisburg	KL2
Bronze medal – third place	2017 Račice	KL2
Bronze medal – third place	2018 Montemor-o-Velho	KL2
European Championships
Gold medal – first place	2019 Poznań	KL2
Gold medal – first place	2021 Poznań	KL2
Gold medal – first place	2024 Szeged	KL2
Silver medal – second place	2017 Plovdiv	KL2
Silver medal – second place	2022 Munich	KL2
Bronze medal – third place	2018 Belgrade	KL2
Bronze medal – third place	2025 Racice	KL2

Mykola Syniuk (born 19 April 1988) is a Ukrainian Para canoeist. He represented Ukraine at the 2016 and 2020, and 2024 Summer Paralympics.

== Career ==
Syniuk represented Ukraine at the 2016 Summer Paralympics in the men's KL2 event and finished in fourth place with a time of 45.349.

Mazhula represented Ukraine at the 2020 Summer Paralympics in the men's KL2 event and won a silver medal with a time of 42.503.
