= KL2 (classification) =

Disability canoeing classification

The KL 2 class is for paracanoe paddlers with partial leg and trunk function alongside good arm strength. A KL2 class paddler should be able to sit upright within the kayak but may require a backrest. These athletes may be able to use a footboard to propel the canoe depending on leg function. Eligible paddlers typically meet one of the following:

- Limb loss of deficiency equivalent to double above leg amputation.
- Significant muscle strength loss in both legs equivalent to complete spinal cord injury at L3 lumbar vertebrae, or incomplete lesion at L1 lumbar vertebrae.
- Impaired range of motion: In lower limbs and trunk

== Definition ==
This classification is for disability athletes. This classification is one of several classification for athletes with lower limb deficiencies, impaired muscle power and/or impaired passive range of motion.

The Australian Paralympic Committee defines this classification for “paddlers who have good use of the arms, but partial leg and trunk function.”

In July 2016, the International Paralympic Committee defined this class as, "Athletes in this sports class have partial trunk and leg function; they are able to sit upright in the kayak. Along with this, they will have limited leg movement during paddling."

== Performance and technique ==
KL 2 paddlers may use a footboard depending on the severity of their disability.

== History ==
The classification was created by the International Paralympic Committee (IPC). In 2003, the IPC Athletics Classification Project developed an evidence-based classification system to assist with eligibility and sports class allocation. In April 2015, the International Canoe Federation released a new classification system ahead of the 2016 Rio Paralympics. Changes were made to rename different classes of para-canoeing. Para-canoeing will be included for the first time at the Summer Paralympics in Rio 2016 as voted in by the IPC in 2010.

Formerly Known As	Currently Known As
A (Arms)	KL1
TA (Trunk and Arms)	KL 2
LTA (Legs, Trunk and Arms)	KL3

For the 2016 Summer Paralympics in Rio, the International Paralympic Committee had a zero classification at the Games policy. This policy was put into place in 2014, with the goal of avoiding last minute changes in classes that would negatively impact athlete training preparations. All competitors needed to be internationally classified with their classification status confirmed prior to the Games, with exceptions to this policy being dealt with on a case-by-case basis.

== Becoming classified ==
Becoming classified as a paddler involves the examination of the impairment, pre-competition assessment of sport specific skills and in competition review. Assessment of sport specific skills includes strength and functional movement training, ergometer testing and on-water testing. Paddlers are classified based on loss of muscle strength equivalent to a spinal cord injury complete at T12 level and impaired range of motion. Each paddler receives a status for classification and further allocated a review time.

== Competitors ==
Medallists in the KL2 class at the 2015 ICF Canoe Sprint World Championships included Markus Swoboda (Austria), Curtis McGrath (Australia), Fernando Rufino de Paulo (Brazil), Emma Wiggs (Great Britain), Nicola Paterson (Great Britain) and Susan Seipel (Australia).

== See also ==
- Paracanoe
- Paracanoeing at the 2016 Summer Paralympics
