= Scott Martlew =

New Zealand paracanoeist

Personal information
- Born: 23 September 1992 (age 33)
- Home town: Christchurch, New Zealand

Sport
- Country: New Zealand
- Sport: Paracanoe
- Disability class: KL2, VL3
Medal record
Men's paracanoeing
Representing New Zealand
World Championships
Silver medal – second place	2018 Montemor-o-Velho	KL2
Bronze medal – third place	2019 Szeged	KL2
Bronze medal – third place	2022 Dartmouth	KL2

Scott Martlew (born 23 September 1992) is a New Zealand Para canoeist from Christchurch, New Zealand, who represented his country at the 2016 and 2020 Summer Paralympics.

== Paralympic Games performances ==
Scott was the first Kiwi to represent New Zealand in Para canoe at the Paralympic Games. He debuted at the Rio 2016 Paralympic Games, becoming New Zealand Paralympian #198. Scott placed 8th in the Men’s 200m KL3. He was selected again for the Tokyo 2020 Paralympic Games, where he narrowly missed the podium, placing 4th in the Men’s 200m KL2. He also placed 8th in the Men’s 200m VL3 in Para va'a (outrigger canoe).

== World Championships performances ==
Scott won a silver medal at the 2018 ICF Canoe Sprint World Championships, a bronze medal at the 2019 ICF Canoe Sprint World Championships, and a bronze medal at the 2022 ICF Canoe Sprint and Para Canoe World Championships.
