= Javier Reja =

Spanish Paralympic rower and former paracanoeist (born 1974)

Personal information
- Born: Javier Reja Muñoz; 20 July 1974 (age 52) Seville, Spain

Sport
- Country: Spain
- Sport: Paracanoe; Adaptive rowing
Medal record
Men's paracanoe
Representing Spain
Sprint World Championships
Gold medal – first place	2013 Duisburg	VL2
Silver medal – second place	2015 Milan	VL2
Silver medal – second place	2016 Duisburg	VL2
European Championships
Silver medal – second place	2013 Montemor-o-Velho	VL2
Silver medal – second place	2016 Moscow	VL2
Marathon World Championships
Silver medal – second place	2025 Győr	VL3

Javier Reja Muñoz (born 20 July 1974) is a Spanish Paralympic rower and former paracanoeist. He competed in paracanoe at the 2016 Summer Paralympics and rowing at the 2020 Summer Paralympics.

== Career ==
In September 2025, he competed at the 2025 ICF Canoe Marathon World Championships and won a silver medal in the VL3 event with a time of 54:13.53. This marked the first time paracanoe was competed in marathon distances at the ICF Canoe Marathon World Championships.

== Accident ==
In 2006, Reja was riding his motorcycle to the Seville airport, he overtook a tractor and skidded along the gravel. He bounced off and got trapped between a tree and the motorbike's engine, his leg injuries were serious and had to undergo several operations along with two months in hospital to recover.

After leaving hospital, he was medically advised to swim and he went on to win medals in the Spanish national swimming championships, as well as swimming, he tried out weightlifting, triathlon and cycling and he won several national cycling medals. Reja took a strong interest in canoeing when he went along the banks of Guadalquivir in 2011, he joined a yacht club in Seville and he won his first international medal at the 2013 Canoe Sprint European Championships in Portugal within a year of training.
