= Markus Swoboda =

Austrian Para canoeist (born 1990)

Personal information
- Full name: Markus Mendy Swoboda
- Born: 5 February 1990 (age 36)

Sport
- Country: Austria
- Sport: Para canoe
- Disability class: KL2
Medal record
Men's Para canoe
Representing Austria
Paralympic Games
Silver medal – second place	2016 Rio de Janeiro	KL2
Sprint World Championships
Gold medal – first place	2010 Poznań	K-1 TA
Gold medal – first place	2011 Szeged	K-1 TA
Gold medal – first place	2012 Poznań	K-1 TA
Gold medal – first place	2013 Duisburg	K-1 TA
Gold medal – first place	2014 Moscow	K-1 TA
Gold medal – first place	2015 Milan	KL2
Silver medal – second place	2016 Duisburg	KL2
Silver medal – second place	2017 Račice	KL2
Silver medal – second place	2017 Račice	VL2
Bronze medal – third place	2021 Copenhagen	KL2
Sprint European Championships
Gold medal – first place	2013 Montemor-o-Velho	K-1 TA
Gold medal – first place	2015 Račice	KL2
Gold medal – first place	2016 Moscow	KL2
Gold medal – first place	2017 Plovdiv	KL2
Gold medal – first place	2017 Plovdiv	VL2
Gold medal – first place	2018 Belgrade	KL2
Silver medal – second place	2019 Poznań	KL2
Silver medal – second place	2021 Poznań	KL2
Marathon World Championships
Gold medal – first place	2025 Győr	KL2
Gold medal – first place	2025 Győr	VL3

Markus Mendy Swoboda (born 5 February 1990) is an Austrian Para canoeist who has competed since the late 2000s. He won a gold medal in the K-1 200 m TA event at the 2010 ICF Canoe Sprint World Championships in Poznań.

== Career ==
In September 2025, he competed at the 2025 ICF Canoe Marathon World Championships and won a gold medal in the VL3 event with a time of 53:31.78. This marked the first time paracanoe was competed in marathon distances at the ICF Canoe Marathon World Championships.
