= Athletics at the 2008 Summer Paralympics – Women's javelin throw F42–46 =

Women's Javelin F42-46 at the XIII Paralympic Games
- Venue: Beijing National Stadium
- Dates: 8 September
- Competitors: 13 from 9 nations
- Winning distance: 40.51

Medalists
1st place, gold medalist(s)		Yao Juan	China
2nd place, silver medalist(s)		Andrea Hegen	Germany
3rd place, bronze medalist(s)		Madeleine Hogan	Australia

The women's javelin F42-46 event at the 2008 Summer Paralympics took place at the Beijing National Stadium at 09:30 on 8 September. There was a single round of competition; after the first three throws, only the top eight had 3 further throws. The competition was won by Yao Juan, representing China.

== Results ==
Rank	Athlete	Nationality	Cl.	1	2	3	4	5	6	Best	Pts.	Notes
1st place, gold medalist(s)	Yao Juan	China	F44	40.29	38.98	40.34	40.51	37.67	x	40.51	1106	WR
2nd place, silver medalist(s)	Andrea Hegen	Germany	F46	36.47	39.23	35.99	x	x	36.87	39.23	1071	WR
3rd place, bronze medalist(s)	Madeleine Hogan	Australia	F46	36.74	33.47	33.98	34.91	36.38	38.89	38.89	1062	SB
4	Zheng Baozhu	China	F42	28.39	x	30.18	31.05	29.32	28.85	31.05	1056	PR
5	Natalia Gudkova	Russia	F46	28.09	34.27	36.28	33.95	37.22	38.16	38.16	1042	SB
6	Jana Schmidt	Germany	F42	28.43	29.36	x	28.67	29.66	x	29.66	1009	SB
7	Claudia Biene	Germany	F42	25.77	28.73	x	29.07	x	26.38	29.07	989	
8	Zhong Yongyuan	China	F42	27.25	28.23	26.64	25.66	28.05	27.19	28.23	960	
9	Marjaana Vare	Finland	F42	x	26.63	26.31	-	-	-	26.63	906	
10	Katarzyna Piekart	Poland	F46	x	x	29.47	-	-	-	29.47	805	
11	Hollie Arnold	Great Britain	F46	28.54	29.10	27.47	-	-	-	29.10	794	
12	Nikoletta Pavlidou	Greece	F46	26.00	27.69	x	-	-	-	27.69	756	
	Artimiza Sequeira	Cape Verde	F42							DNS		

WR = World Record. PR = Paralympic Record. SB = Seasonal Best. DNS = Did not start.
