= Athletics at the 2004 Summer Paralympics – Women's javelin throw F42–46 =

Women's Javelin F42-46 at the XII Paralympic Games
- Venue: Athens Olympic Stadium
- Dates: 24 September 2004
- Competitors: 12 from 7 nations
- Winning distance: 28.79

Medalists
1st place, gold medalist(s)		Marjaana Vare	Finland
2nd place, silver medalist(s)		Natalia Goudkova	Russia
3rd place, bronze medalist(s)		Andrea Hegen	Germany

The Women's javelin throw F42-46 event for amputee athletes was held at the 2004 Summer Paralympics in the Athens Olympic Stadium on 25 September. It was won by Marjaana Vare, representing Finland.

24 Sept. 2004, 09:00

Rank	Athlete	Result	Points	Notes
1st place, gold medalist(s)	Marjaana Vare (FIN)	28.79	1037	WR
2nd place, silver medalist(s)	Natalia Goudkova (RUS)	37.58	1012	WR
3rd place, bronze medalist(s)	Andrea Hegen (GER)	36.67	988	
4	Zheng Bao Zhu (CHN)	27.32	984	
5	Yao Juan (CHN)	35.28	950	
6	Yang Yue (CHN)	33.70	908	
7	Claudia Biene (GER)	24.54	884	
8	Tatiana Mezinova (RUS)	28.82	776	
9	Malda Baumgarte (LTU)	26.37	710	
10	Noralvis de las Heras (CUB)	25.66	691	
11	Jessica Sachse (GER)	25.15	677	
12	Stela Eneva (BUL)	13.45	362	
