= 2024 ICF Paracanoe World Championships – Women's VL3 =

Women's VL3 at the 2024 ICF Paracanoe World Championships
- Venue: Olympic Centre of Szeged
- Location: Szeged, Hungary
- Dates: 9–10 May
- Competitors: 20 from 15 nations
- Winning time: 56.80

Medalists
gold medal	Charlotte Henshaw	Great Britain
silver medal	Hope Gordon	Great Britain
bronze medal	Shakhzoda Mamadalieva	Uzbekistan

The women's VL3 competition at the 2024 ICF Paracanoe World Championships in Szeged took place at the Olympic Centre of Szeged.

== Schedule ==
The schedule was as follows:

Date	Time	Round
Thursday 9 May 2024	9:30	Heats
Thursday 9 May 2024	11:55	Semifinals
Friday 10 May 2024	10:58	Final B
Friday 10 May 2024	11:21	Final A

All times are Central European Summer Time (UTC+2)

== Results ==
=== Heats ===
Heat winners advanced directly to the A final.
The next six fastest boats in each heat advanced to the semifinals.

==== Heat 1 ====
Rank	Name	Country	Time	Notes
1	Hope Gordon	Great Britain	55.38	QA
2	Shakhzoda Mamadalieva	Uzbekistan	56.39	QS
3	Nataliia Lagutenko	Ukraine	59.90	QS
4	Thais Coutinho de Freitas	Brazil	1:01.11	QS
5	Elea Charvet	France	1:02.73	QS
6	Sangeeta Rajput	India	1:06.76	QS
7	Shabana	India	1:07.74	QS

==== Heat 2 ====
Rank	Name	Country	Time	Notes
1	Charlotte Henshaw	Great Britain	55.87	QA
2	Zhong Yongyuan	China	58.79	QS
3	Erica Scarff	Canada	59.09	QS
4	Zhanyl Baltabayeva	Kazakhstan	1:03.00	QS
5	Monika Kukla	Poland	1:03.09	QS
6	Kaia Scholl	Australia	1:06.16	QS
7	Shiho Miyajima	Japan	1:15.11	QS

==== Heat 3 ====
Rank	Name	Country	Time	Notes
1	Mari Santilli	Brazil	59.68	QA
2	Jillian Elwart	United States	1:00.86	QS
3	Amy Ralph	Australia	1:01.54	QS
4	Justyna Regucka	Poland	1:06.13	QS
5	Úrsula Pueyo	Spain	1:10.10	QS
6	Alejandra Olivares	Chile	1:10.21	QS

=== Semifinals ===
The fastest three boats in each semi advanced to the A final.
The next four fastest boats in each semi, plus the fastest remaining boat advanced to the B final.

==== Semifinal 1 ====
Rank	Name	Country	Time	Notes
1	Shakhzoda Mamadalieva	Uzbekistan	57.40	QA
2	Erica Scarff	Canada	59.58	QA
3	Thais Coutinho de Freitas	Brazil	1:01.44	QA
4	Amy Ralph	Australia	1:01.76	QB
5	Monika Kukla	Poland	1:01.97	QB
6	Justyna Regucka	Poland	1:06.24	QB
7	Sangeeta Rajput	India	1:07.45	QB
8	Alejandra Olivares	Chile	1:12.71	
9	Shiho Miyajima	Japan	1:16.35	

==== Semifinal 2 ====
Rank	Name	Country	Time	Notes
1	Zhong Yongyuan	China	58.12	QA
2	Nataliia Lagutenko	Ukraine	59.63	QA
3	Jillian Elwart	United States	1:0l.10	QA
4	Elea Charvet	France	1:01.40	QB
5	Zhanyl Baltabayeva	Kazakhstan	1:02.74	QB
6	Kaia Scholl	Australia	1:04.37	QB
7	Shabana	India	1:07.97	QB
8	Úrsula Pueyo	Spain	1:09.50	qB

=== Finals ===
==== Final B ====
Competitors raced for positions 10 to 18.

Rank	Name	Country	Time
1	Monika Kukla	Poland	1:05.45
2	Zhanyl Baltabayeva	Kazakhstan	1:05.83
3	Elea Charvet	France	1:07.33
4	Justyna Regucka	Poland	1:09.23
5	Sangeeta Rajput	India	1:11.16
6	Kaia Scholl	Australia	1:12.44
7	Úrsula Pueyo	Spain	1:13.56
–	Amy Ralph	Australia	DSQ
–	Shabana	India	DNS

==== Final A ====
Competitors raced for positions 1 to 9, with medals going to the top three.

Rank	Name	Country	Time
1st place, gold medalist(s)	Charlotte Henshaw	Great Britain	56.80
2nd place, silver medalist(s)	Hope Gordon	Great Britain	56.91
3rd place, bronze medalist(s)	Shakhzoda Mamadalieva	Uzbekistan	58.22
4	Erica Scarff	Canada	1:00.19
5	Zhong Yongyuan	China	1:00.56
6	Nataliia Lagutenko	Ukraine	1:01.87
7	Mari Santilli	Brazil	1:02.10
8	Thais Coutinho de Freitas	Brazil	1:03.95
9	Jillian Elwart	United States	1:04.99
