= 2025 ICF Canoe Sprint World Championships – Women's VL3 =

Women's VL3 at the 2025 ICF Canoe Sprint World Championships
- Venue: Idroscalo Regatta Course
- Location: Milan, Italy
- Dates: 22–23 August
- Competitors: 21 from 15 nations
- Winning time: 55.77

Medalists
gold medal	Hope Gordon	Great Britain
silver medal	Charlotte Henshaw	Great Britain
bronze medal	Cai Yuqingyan	China

The women's VL3 200 metres competition at the 2025 ICF Canoe Sprint World Championships in Milan took place at Idroscalo Regatta Course.

== Schedule ==
The schedule is as follows:

Date	Time	Round
Friday 22 August 2025	08:00	Heats
Friday 22 August 2025	11:33	Semifinals
Saturday 23 August 2025	9:45	Final B
Saturday 23 August 2025	10:28	Final A

== Results ==
=== Heats ===
Heat winners advanced directly to the A final.
The fastest boat in each heat advanced directly to the final (FA). The next six fastest boats in each heat advanced to the semifinal (QS)..

==== Heat 1 ====
Rank	Canoeist	Country	Time	Notes
1	Charlotte Henshaw	Great Britain	56.40	FA
2	Mari Santilli	Brazil	58.73	QS
3	Monika Kukla	Poland	1:00.55	QS
4	Larisa Volik	Individual Neutral Athletes	1:01.05	QS
5	Jillian Elwart	United States	1:03.37	QS
6	Amy Ralph	Australia	1:04.89	QS
7	Prachi Yadav	India	1:05.33	QS

==== Heat 2 ====
Rank	Canoeist	Country	Time	Notes
1	Hope Gordon	Great Britain	55.37	FA
2	Zhong Yongyuan	China	58.67	QS
3	Anja Adler	Germany	1:01.91	QS
4	Zhanyl Baltabayeva	Kazakhstan	1:02.00	QS
5	Erica Scarff	Canada	1:02.13	QS
6	Sangeeta Rajput	India	1:12.24	QS
7	Zakaria Abakar Nouracham	Italy	1:13.21	QS

==== Heat 3 ====
Rank	Canoeist	Country	Time	Notes
1	Cai Yuqingyan	China	59.14	FA
2	Shakhzoda Mamadalieva	Uzbekistan	59.90	QS
3	Elea Charvet	France	1:00.46	QS
4	Erisangela Toniolo	Brazil	1:02.08	QS
5	Nadezhda Andreeva	Individual Neutral Athletes	1:02.51	QS
6	Svitlana Bohuslavska	Ukraine	1:03.94	QS
7	Justyna Regucka	Poland	1:05.17	QS

=== Semifinals ===
The fastest three boats in each semi advanced to the A final. The next four fastest boats in each semi, plus the fastest remaining boat advanced to the B final.

==== Semifinal 1 ====
Rank	Canoeist	Country	Time	Notes
1	Elea Charvet	France	59.67	FA
2	Mari Santilli	Brazil	1:00.33	FA
3	Erica Scarff	Canada	1:00.51	FA
4	Larisa Volik	Individual Neutral Athletes	1:00.83	FB
5	Anja Adler	Germany	1:02.17	FB
6	Svitlana Bohuslavska	Ukraine	1:02.92	FB
7	Erisangela Toniolo	Brazil	1:03.28	FB
8	Amy Ralph	Australia	1:05.17	qB
9	Zakaria Abakar Nouracham	Italy	1:12.55	

==== Semifinal 2 ====
Rank	Canoeist	Country	Time	Notes
1	Shakhzoda Mamadalieva	Uzbekistan	58.03	FA
2	Zhong Yongyuan	China	58.78	FA
3	Monika Kukla	Poland	1:01.21	FA
4	Zhanyl Baltabayeva	Kazakhstan	1:01.59	FB
5	Nadezhda Andreeva	Individual Neutral Athletes	1:01.91	FB
6	Jillian Elwart	United States	1:05.24	FB
7	Justyna Regucka	Poland	1:06.01	FB
8	Prachi Yadav	India	1:08.07	
9	Sangeeta Rajput	India	1:10.61	

=== Finals ===
==== Final B ====
Competitors raced for positions 10 to 18.

Rank	Canoeist	Country	Time	Notes
1	Zhanyl Baltabayeva	Kazakhstan	1:02.91	
2	Nadezhda Andreeva	Individual Neutral Athletes	1:03.17	
3	Larisa Volik	Individual Neutral Athletes	1:03.35	
4	Anja Adler	Germany	1:03.70	
5	Svitlana Bohuslavska	Ukraine	1:05.17	
6	Justyna Regucka	Poland	1:06.25	
7	Erisangela Toniolo	Brazil	1:06.35	
8	Amy Ralph	Australia	1:06.58	
9	Jillian Elwart	United States	1:07.69	

==== Final A ====
Competitors raced for positions 1 to 9, with medals going to the top three.

Rank	Canoeist	Country	Time	Notes
1st place, gold medalist(s)	Hope Gordon	Great Britain	55.77	
2nd place, silver medalist(s)	Charlotte Henshaw	Great Britain	58.11	
3rd place, bronze medalist(s)	Cai Yuqingyan	China	58.67	
4	Shakhzoda Mamadalieva	Uzbekistan	59.17	
5	Zhong Yongyuan	China	59.25	
6	Elea Charvet	France	1:00.02	
7	Mari Santilli	Brazil	1:00.65	
8	Erica Scarff	Canada	1:00.86	
9	Monika Kukla	Poland	1:01.63	
