= 2026 ICF Canoe Sprint World Championships – Women's VL3 =

Women's VL3 at the 2026 ICF Canoe Sprint World Championships
- Venue: Lake Malta
- Location: Poznań, Poland
- Dates: 27–30 August
- Winning time: 55.01

Medalists
gold medal	Hope Gordon	Great Britain
silver medal	Zhong Yongyuan	China
bronze medal	Shakhzoda Mamadalieva	Uzbekistan

The women's VL3 competition at the 2026 ICF Canoe Sprint World Championships in Poznań took place at Lake Malta.

== Schedule ==
The schedule is as follows:

Date	Time	Round
Thursday 27 August 2026	15:20	Heats
Friday 28 August 2026	11:17	Semifinals
Sunday 30 August 2026	09:35	Final B
Sunday 30 August 2026	10:34	Final A

=== Finals ===
Competitors raced for positions 1 to 9, with medals going to the top three..

Rank	Lane	Name	Nation	Time	Gap
1st place, gold medalist(s)	6	Hope Gordon	Great Britain	55.01	
2nd place, silver medalist(s)	4	Zhong Yongyuan	China	57.04	+2.03
3rd place, bronze medalist(s)	2	Shakhzoda Mamadalieva	Uzbekistan	58.76	+3.75
4	9	Larisa Volik	Individual Neutral Athletes-A	59.16	+4.15
5	7	Erica Scarff	Canada	59.23	+4.22
6	5	Cai Yuqingyan	China	59.54	+4.53
7	3	Monika Kukla	Poland	1:00.17	+5.16
8	8	Thais Coutinho de Freitas	Brazil	1:01.18	+6.17
9	1	Nataliia Lagutenko	Ukraine	1:01.78	+6.77
