= List of 2023 Canada Winter Games medallists =

The following is the list of medallists from the 2023 Canada Winter Games held in Prince Edward Island, New Brunswick (skiing) and Nova Scotia (long track speed skating).

== Medallists ==
=== Archery ===
Event	Gold	Silver	Bronze
Men's compound	Adam Berge; Alberta	Dustin Watson; Ontario	Ryan Cherniak; Manitoba
Men's recurve	Ryder Wilson; Manitoba	Luke Smollett; Alberta	Arden Hopkin; Prince Edward Island
Women's compound	Chyler Brynn Sanders; Manitoba	Abby Bunn; Ontario	Eliana Stein; Alberta
Women's recurve	Aëlis Couture; Quebec	Emily Kae Yun Yen; British Columbia	Emily Love; Manitoba
Mixed team compound	Adam Berge; Haley Priest; Alberta	Abby Bunn; Dustin Watson; Ontario	Ryan Cherniak; Chyler Brynn Sanders; Manitoba
Mixed team recurve	Amelia Gagné; Durvishan Thananchayan; Ontario	Emily Love; Ryder Wilson; Manitoba	Alison Dewling; Luke Smollett; Alberta

=== Alpine skiing ===
Event	Gold		Silver		Bronze	
Men's Super-G	Philippe Savard; Quebec	44.37	Émile Piché; Quebec	44.54	Luka McKinlay; Quebec	44.82
Men's giant slalom	Émile Piché; Quebec	1:47.25	Thomas Cais; Alberta	1:48.64	Luka McKinlay; Quebec	1:49.89
Men's slalom	Louis-Thomas Cantin; Quebec	1:42.20	Philippe Savard; Quebec	1:42.56	Henri Michaud; Quebec	1:42.73
Men's Ski cross	Charles Leduc; Quebec		Louis-Thomas Cantin; Quebec		Maddox Johnson; British Columbia	
Women's Super-G	Roxy Coatesworth; British Columbia	45.08	Charlie Houde; Quebec	45.93	Rebecca Pelkey; Alberta	45.93
Women's giant slalom	Roxy Coatesworth; British Columbia	1:49.05	Arielle Desrosiers; Quebec	1:51.17	Léanne Aubut-Laurin; Quebec	1:51.41
Women's slalom	Roxy Coatesworth; British Columbia	1:27.48	Rebecca Pelkey; Alberta	1:29.99	Arielle Desrosiers; Quebec	1:30.72
Women's Ski cross	Roxy Coatesworth; British Columbia		Léa Bérubé; Quebec		Emilia Richardson; Alberta	

Para

Event	Gold		Silver		Bronze	
Men's giant slalom	Kalle Eriksson; Alberta	1:50.09	Matthew Leach; British Columbia	2:23.20	Samuel Peters; British Columbia	2:26.10
Men's slalom	Matthew Leach; British Columbia	2:13.29	James Budrow; Ontario	2:28.59	Hayden Denouden; Nova Scotia	2:29.27
Women's giant slalom	Florence Carrier; Quebec	2:10.99	Not awarded		Not awarded	
Women's slalom	Florence Carrier; Quebec	1:50.02	Andrea Nelson; Ontario	2:49.14	Not awarded	

=== Badminton ===
Event	Gold	Silver	Bronze
Men's singles	Timothy Lock; Ontario	Thomas Ashton; Nova Scotia	Anthony Wong; Alberta
Men's doubles	Colin Jia; Ivan Li; Ontario	Alexander Bianchini; Andrew Choi; Quebec	Victor Huang; Wenjun Ouyang; British Columbia
Women's singles	Chloe Huang; Ontario	Ritu Shah; Nova Scotia	Natalie Nakatsui; Alberta
Women's doubles	Jessica Cheng; Sophia Nong; Ontario	Sharon Au; Jeslyn Chow; Ontario	Samantha Hui; Catherine Plante-Gonthier; Quebec
Mixed doubles	Chloe Huang; Timothy Lock; Ontario	Colin Jia; Sharon Au; Ontario	Raymond Li; Jessica Cheng; Ontario
Mixed team	Ontario	Alberta	British Columbia

=== Biathlon ===
Event	Gold		Silver		Bronze	
Men's sprint	Jean-Nicolas de Broeck; Quebec	21:12.9	Liam Tinworth; Alberta	22:23.5	Peter Rojkovski; Alberta	22:51.0
Men's individual	Jean-Nicolas de Broeck; Quebec	38:59.1	Sebastian Solomonson; British Columbia	39:26.5	Theo Fradette; Alberta	40:18.0
Men's pursuit	Jean-Nicolas de Broeck; Quebec	26:12.7	Liam Tinworth; Alberta	28:21.2	Liam Simons; British Columbia	28:27.2
Women's sprint	Julia Bartlett; Alberta	18:37.1	Molly Caldwell; British Columbia	18:38.0	Rhiann Arnold; Saskatchewan	19:16.3
Women's individual	Mia Rodger; British Columbia	40:07.8	Jessabelle Trelenberg; British Columbia	40:11.6	Molly Caldwell; British Columbia	40:49.3
Women's pursuit	Molly Caldwell; British Columbia	28:41.5	Julia Bartlett; Alberta	29:45.3	Mia Rodger; British Columbia	30:37.0
Single mixed relay	Jean-Nicolas de Broeck; Isabelle Caza; Quebec	58:52.0	Peter Rojkovski; Wallis Siemens; Alberta	59:39.4	Cole Germain; Cheyenne Tirschmann; Yukon	59:44.9
Mixed relay	Francois Gauthier; François Harvey; Laurie Jacques; Amélya Pouliot; Quebec	1:09:54.6	Molly Caldwell; Parker Munroe; Mia Rodger; Liam Simons; British Columbia	1:10:41.5	Luca Baergen; Aimee-Rae Morin; Kase Reppe; Liam Tinworth; Alberta	1:11:06.8

=== Boxing ===
Event	Gold	Silver	Bronze
Men's 57 kg	Jeremy Drapeau; Quebec	Brody Andrie; Alberta	Simon Joseph Romero; Ontario
Men's 63.5 kg	Owen Paquette; Ontario	Gabriel Aly-Ndiaye; Quebec	Jullian Wilson; Nova Scotia
Men's 67 kg	Attila Ahmed; Alberta	Logan Walsh; Nova Scotia	Jackson Cook; Ontario
Men's 75 kg	Vincent Santoriello; Quebec	Joshua Antwi; Ontario	Mike Gosine; Newfoundland and Labrador
Men's 80 kg	Parm Pannu; Ontario	Gatwich Kol Kot; Alberta	Adam Naili; Quebec
Women's 52	Talia Birch; Quebec	Ruqaya Nawaz; Ontario	Tessa Scott; New Brunswick
Women's 60 kg	Emily Vigneault; Alberta	Victoria Vergos; Ontario	Alessia Mansueto; Quebec

=== Curling ===
Event	Gold	Silver	Bronze
Men's tournament	Calan MacIsaac; Nathan Gray; Owain Fisher; Christopher McCurdy; Nova Scotia	Chris Parkinson; Neil Imada; Graham Lee; Jesse Tiede; British Columbia	Kyle Stratton; Liam Tardif; Dylan Stockton; Owen Nicholls; Ontario
Women's tournament	Sophie Blades; Kate Weissent; Stephanie Atherton; Alexis Cluney; Nova Scotia	Myla Plett; Alyssa Nedohin; Chloe Fediuk; Allie Iskiw; Alberta	Jolianne Fortin; Emy Lafrance; Megan Lafrance; Mégane Fortin; Quebec
Mixed doubles	Kaylee Raniseth; Evan Crough; Alberta	Tori Zemmelink; Kibo Mulima; Ontario	Lauren Cheal; Cédric Maurice; Quebec

=== Cross-country skiing ===
Event	Gold		Silver		Bronze	
Men's sprint	Ry Prior; Quebec	2:34.49	Alexandre Cormier; Quebec	2:34.81	Justin Boudreau; Quebec	2:36.25
Men's 10 km	Garrett Siever; British Columbia	26:48.60	Noah Chaba; Alberta	27:19.00	Ry Prior; Quebec	27:22.20
Men's 15 km	Alexandre Cormier; Quebec	41:24.60	Eamon Wilson; British Columbia	41:26.30	Xavier Lefebvre; Quebec	41:27.90
Women's sprint	Tory Audet; Quebec	2:54.02	Alison Mackie; Alberta	2:59.50	Addison Frank; Ontario	3:05.85
Women's 7.5 km	Tory Audet; Quebec	22:25.30	Alison Mackie; Alberta	22:46.90	Sabine Comeau; Alberta	23:07.40
Women's 10 km	Alison Mackie; Alberta	31:25.30	Alexandra Luxmoore; British Columbia	31:26.10	Marlie Molinaro; British Columbia	31:43.00
Mixed relay	Alexandra Luxmoore; Ian Mayer; Marlie Molinaro; Eamon Wilson; British Columbia	47:32.90	Sabine Comeau; Alison Mackie; Jonas Rolseth; Noah Chaba; Alberta	47:34.60	Tory Audet; Alexandre Cormier; Xavier Lefebvre; Élie-Anne Tremblay; Quebec	47:38.00

Para

Event	Gold		Silver		Bronze	
Men's sprint sitting	Kaden Baum; British Columbia	3:33.00	Nathan Perry; Ontario	5:37.00	Not awarded	
Men's sprint standing	Logan Cox; British Columbia	3:18.00	Logan Lariviere; Ontario	3:39.00	Félix Lafond; Quebec	3:40.00
Men's 2.5 km sitting	Kaden Baum; British Columbia	12:01.00	Nathan Perry; Ontario	17:59.00	Not awarded	
Men's 2.5 km standing	Logan Cox; British Columbia	6:48.50	Félix Lafond; Quebec	7:44.40	Jesse Bachinsky; Manitoba	8:10.70
Men's 5 km sitting	Kaden Baum; British Columbia	26:03.60	Nathan Perry; Ontario	36:10.40	Not awarded	
Men's 5 km standing	Logan Cox; British Columbia	12:33.00	Félix Lafond; Quebec	14:56.00	Logan Lariviere; Ontario	15:18.00
Women's sprint sitting	Erica Carmela Scarff; Ontario	4:15.00	Lily Brook; British Columbia	4:33.00	Tanya Quesnel; Ontario	4:54.00
Women's sprint standing	Madison Mullin; Ontario	4:38.00	Emma Archibald; Nova Scotia	4:42.00	Not awarded	
Women's 2.5 km sitting	Lily Brook; British Columbia; Erica Carmela Scarff; Ontario	13:41.00	Not awarded		Tanya Quesnel; Ontario	13:56.00
Women's 2.5 km standing	Emma Archibald; Nova Scotia	9:44.10	Madison Mullin; Ontario	10:02.90	Not awarded	
Women's 5 km sitting	Erica Carmela Scarff; Ontario	22:55.00	Tanya Quesnel; Ontario	23:26.10	Krystle Shewchuk; Saskatchewan	24:28.80
Women's 5 km standing	Emma Archibald; Nova Scotia	16:43.00	Madison Mullin; Ontario	18:19.00	Not awarded	

=== Fencing ===
Event	Gold	Silver	Bronze
Men's épee	Ivan Lu; British Columbia	Graham Goodwin; New Brunswick	Avalo Zhai; Ontario
Men's épee	Ivan Lu; British Columbia	Graham Goodwin; New Brunswick	Matias Enciso; Manitoba
Men's foil	Leon Wujastyk; Alberta	Adrian Wong; British Columbia	Spencer Orr; Ontario
Men's foil	Leon Wujastyk; Alberta	Adrian Wong; British Columbia	Mingxuan Shen; Quebec
Men's sabre	Matthew Teng; Ontario	Kevin Zhu; British Columbia	William Robinson; Alberta
Men's sabre	Matthew Teng; Ontario	Kevin Zhu; British Columbia	Mathis Falcon-Korb; Quebec
Women's épee	Elaine Hong; Ontario	Cheryl Cheung; Manitoba	Claire Han; New Brunswick
Women's épee	Elaine Hong; Ontario	Cheryl Cheung; Manitoba	Veronica Scherk; British Columbia
Women's foil	Danise Leung; British Columbia	Ellie Davies; Ontario	Dominique Richard; New Brunswick
Women's foil	Danise Leung; British Columbia	Ellie Davies; Ontario	Margoe Chatel; Quebec
Women's sabre	Julie Xiao; Ontario	Khloe Lessard-Kulchyski; Manitoba	Katia Barbosa; Quebec
Women's sabre	Julie Xiao; Ontario	Khloe Lessard-Kulchyski; Manitoba	Augusta De Silva; Alberta
Mixed team	Danise Leung; Finn Liu; Ivan Lu; Veronica Scherk; Adrian Wong; Yuchen Zhu; British Columbia	Ellie Davies; Elaine Hong; Spencer Orr; Matthew Teng; Julie Xiao; Avalo Zhai; Ontario	Katia Barbosa; Margot Châtel; Mathis Falcon-Korb; Robert Joannis; Mingxuan Shen; Helena Tran; Quebec

=== Figure skating ===
Event	Gold		Silver		Bronze	
Men's	Rui Qin; Ontario	112.22	Louie Fukuda-Wur; British Columbia	106.02	Travis Trang; Alberta	101.87
Women's	Sandrine Blais; Quebec	127.65	Lia Cho; Alberta	125.94	Yuxin Wang; Ontario	118.14
Pairs	Keith Lau; Julia Xiao; Manitoba	105.53	Sarah-Jade Cyr; Étienne Lacasse; Quebec	103.08	Mark Butt; Lily Evans; Newfoundland and Labrador	97.35
Ice dance	Mickey Becker-Pos; Tasha Lai; British Columbia	95.07	Kurtis Che; Anjou Karino; Alberta	83.94	Maia Balan; Andrew Song; Alberta	83.60

Special Olympics

Event	Gold	Silver	Bronze
Men's level 2	Maddox Glover; Newfoundland and Labrador	Karl Dietrich; Ontario	William Cave; Alberta
Men's level 3	Mike Sumner; Yukon	Not awarded	Not awarded
Women's level 2	Sarah Thomas; Ontario	Tin-Yee Ho; British Columbia	JC Coutts; Alberta
Women's level 3	Kayla Rose Cooper; Nova Scotia	Molly Kane; New Brunswick	Kariane Provencher; Quebec

=== Freestyle skiing ===
Event	Gold		Silver		Bronze	
Men's aerials	Alexander Peter Mysko; British Columbia	123.16	Brian Burnyeat; Alberta	120.46	Maximus Gryspeerdt; Ontario	57.27
Men's big air	Jérémy Gagné; Quebec	94.80	Rémi Asselin; Quebec	92.80	Malcolm George Farris; Nova Scotia	92.20
Men's moguls	Louis-David Chalifoux; Quebec	79.25	Mavrick Sauvé; Quebec	76.46	Cole Carey; British Columbia	73.91
Men's dual Moguls	Louis-David Chalifoux; Quebec		Cole Carey; British Columbia		Félix Bertrand; Quebec	
Men's slopestyle	Tate Garrod; British Columbia	85.83	Aidan Mulvihill; British Columbia	84.67	Jérémy Gagné; Quebec	81.17
Women's aerials	Maya Mikkelsen; British Columbia	106.92	Sina Clegg; Alberta	103.30	Ashley Koehler; Quebec	103.05
Women's big air	Jordan Lindsay Peet; British Columbia	89.60	Evelyn Mullie; Alberta	84.60	Ava Aubry; Ontario	78.20
Women's moguls	Ashley Koehler; Quebec	72.48	Maya Mikkelsen; British Columbia	68.83	Lynnette Conn; British Columbia	64.63
Women's dual Moguls	Ashley Koehler; Quebec		Lynnette Conn; British Columbia		Romane Carreau; Quebec	
Women's slopestyle	Ayden Fraser; Alberta	88.67	Naomi Urness; Quebec	88.00	Jordan Lindsay Peet; British Columbia	83.83
Mixed team dual Moguls	Cole Carey; Maya Mikkelsen; British Columbia		Félix Bertrand; Annarose Boulianne; Quebec		Alexander Peter Mysko; Lynnette Conn; British Columbia	

=== Gymnastics ===
==== Artistic ====
Event	Gold		Silver		Bronze	
Men's team	Matteo Bardana; Trent Milligan; Xavier Olasz; Sam Rakita; Jack Stargratt-Sweeney; Sam Waller; Ontario	305.550	Blake Morfitt; Connor Fielding; Ethan Ikeda; Jackson Martin; Joshua Martini; Kai Iwassa; British Columbia	303.650	Dominic Allaire; Liam Benoît; Victor Canuel; Raphaël Madore; Edouard Nadeau; Thomas Tittley; Quebec	302.900
Men's individual all-around	Xavier Olasz; Ontario	77.750	Victor Canuel; Quebec	77.000	Trent Milligan; Ontario	76.100
Men's floor	Kai Iwassa; British Columbia	13.325	Victor Canuel; Quebec	13.225	Jack Stargratt-Sweeney; Ontario	13.200
Men's horizontal bar	Blake Morfitt; British Columbia	12.675	Trent Milligan; Ontario	12.475	Victor Canuel; Quebec	12.375
Men's parallel bars	Ethan Ikeda; British Columbia	13.100	Trent Milligan; Ontario	13.000	Matteo Bardana; Ontario	12.850
Men's pommel horse	Jordan Carroll; Saskatchewan	12.500	Dominic Allaire; Quebec	12.425	Ethan Ikeda; British Columbia	12.375
Men's rings	Kai Iwassa; British Columbia	13.075	Victor Canuel; Quebec	13.025	Xavier Olasz; Ontario	12.750
Men's vault	Jackson Martin; Quebec	14.275	Kai Iwassa; British Columbia	14.025	Xavier Olasz; Ontario	13.775
Women's team	Cleante Theoret; Ella Power; Jada Yip-Janniere; Jenna Sartoretto; Maya Peters; Nyla Morabito; Ontario	148.395	Sarah Couture; Valérie Menezes-Thibault; Raphaëlle Perreault; Frédérique Sgarbossa; Virginie Therrien; Saki Yoshida; Quebec	147.262	Beth Noble; Jordanna Maria Phillis; Lila Bulka; Makenzie Grant; Sophie Patterson; British Columbia	143.787
Women's individual all-around	Frédérique Sgarbossa; Quebec	37.665	Jenna Sartoretto; Ontario	37.032	Raphaëlle Perreault; Quebec	37.019
Women's beam	Jenna Sartoretto; Ontario	9.537	Rylee Miller; Saskatchewan	9.525		
Women's beam	Jenna Sartoretto; Ontario	Cleante Theoret; Ontario	9.525			
Women's floor	Rylee Miller; Saskatchewan	9.300	Cleante Theoret; Ontario	9.275	Nyla Morabito; Ontario	9.250
Women's uneven bars	Saki Yoshida; Quebec	9.512	Nyla Morabito; Ontario	9.462	Rylee Miller; Saskatchewan	9.375
Women's vault	Raphaëlle Perreault; Quebec	9.500	Jenna Sartoretto; Ontario	9.483	Frédérique Sgarbossa; Quebec	9.416

==== Trampoline ====
Event	Gold		Silver		Bronze	
Men's individual	Gleb Evstigneev; Newfoundland and Labrador	54.450	Étienne Cloutier; Quebec	53.940	Dexter Richard; New Brunswick	53.510
Men's synchro	Eric Davis; Dexter Richard; New Brunswick	43.270	Wilson Reimche; Connor Wehage; Saskatchewan	42.360	Cody Cyman; Artur Troyan; Alberta	42.110
Women's individual	Brooklyn Lee-McMeeken; British Columbia	48.115	Abigael Brownell; Nova Scotia	47.995	Rielle Bonne; Ontario	47.735
Women's synchro	Rielle Bonne; Kasha Noga-Bard; Ontario	44.930	Halle Pipko; Jami Reschke; Saskatchewan	41.100	Abigael Brownell; Amy Garrett; Nova Scotia	41.100
Mixed team	Étienne Cloutier; Amylia Leporé; Nathan Levasseur; Anne-Jolie Roy; Quebec	101.930	Rielle Bonne; Alexander Don; Declan Highstead; Kasha Noga-Bard; Ontario	100.650	Cody Cyman; Claire Jackson; Katarina Kotkas; Artur Troyan; Alberta	99.290

=== Hockey ===
Event	Gold	Silver	Bronze
Men's tournament	Quinn Beauchesne; Matheas Stark; Peter Legostaev; Carson Lee Cameron; Maasilan Etchart; Matthew Schaefer; Tyler Hopkins; Evan Elliott; Brady Martin; Tristan Boudreau; Chase Hull; Parker Snelgrove; William Moore; Harry Nansi; Dryden Allen; Ryan Roobroeck; Jack Nesbitt; Nico Addy; Jaeden Nelson; Jack Ivankovic; Ontario	Logan Edmonstone; Carsen Adair; Emerson Clark; Reese Hamilton; Jaxon Herchak; Isaac Poll; Brayden Smith; Corban Almen; Kash Andresen; Joby Baumuller; Connor Bear; Dayce Derkatch; Kazden Mathies; Luke Moroz; Cam Perlinger; Cobe Perlinger; Cole Reschny; Parker Rondeau; Lee Shurgot; Berney Weston; Saskatchewan	Julien Bonnet; Benjamin Amyot; Louis-Alex Tremblay; Jonathan Prud'homme; Alex Huang; Nathan Watson; Louis-François Bélanger; Olivier Lampron; Shawn Carrier; Caleb Desnoyers; Émile Guité; Elliot Desmarais; Nathan Lecompte; Olivier Groulx; Anthony Flanagan; Emile Ricard; Philippe Veilleux; Jordan Labelle; Samuel Meloche; William Lacelle; Quebec
Women's tournament	Hailey Armstrong; Jordan Baxter; Mikayla Blomquist; Molly Cole; Aynsley D'Ottavio; Gracie Graham; Morgan Jackson; Clara Juca; Aurora Kahlert; Gillian Lapierre; Maddie Leaney; Danica Maynard; London McDavid; Jaylyn Morris; Rebecca Noble; Chloe Primerano; Vienna Rubin; Vanessa Schaefer; Maya Serdachny; Jaimee Spring; British Columbia	Jorja Burrows; Sarah Callaghan; Maggie Duck; Sarah Fraser; Kate Furlong; Mia Giles; Sarah Leopold; Hayden Lilly; Julia MacDonald; Jessica Grace MacKinnon; Bree MacPherson; Ellie McClean; Sam Morrison; Sophie Pomeroy; Ava Shearer; Rhyah Stewart; Samantha Taylor; Brooke Thomson; Rachel Walsh; Brooke Williams; Nova Scotia	Mackenzie Alexander; Ashley Allard; Jocelyn Amos; Naomi Baechler; Hannah Clark; Hannah Clarke; Mackenzie Clarke; Piper Grober; Keira Hurry; Caitlin Kraemer; Shelby Laidlaw; Kahlen Lamarche; Alex Law; Abby Lunney; Taya MacDonald; Claire Murdoch; Emma Pais; Charlotte Pieckenhagen; Abby Stonehouse; Emma Venusio; Ontario

=== Judo ===
Event	Gold	Silver	Bronze
Men's 50 kg	Antoine Desgranges; Quebec	Connor Hazell; Alberta	Avery Pampolina; Manitoba
Men's 50 kg	Antoine Desgranges; Quebec	Connor Hazell; Alberta	Arel Roitman; Ontario
Men's 55 kg	Loic Beaton; Alberta	Tayven Tremblay; Alberta	Antoine Jeanpierre; Quebec
Men's 55 kg	Loic Beaton; Alberta	Tayven Tremblay; Alberta	Nathan Thiel; British Columbia
Men's 60 kg	Raph Gaanan; British Columbia	Lowan Le Bris; British Columbia	Aden Kim; Alberta
Men's 60 kg	Raph Gaanan; British Columbia	Lowan Le Bris; British Columbia	Egan McLean; New Brunswick
Men's 66 kg	Fahd Fithane; Quebec	Shon Tansky; Ontario	Ashton Debruyne; Saskatchewan
Men's 66 kg	Fahd Fithane; Quebec	Shon Tansky; Ontario	Troy Gallant; Alberta
Men's 73 kg	Arthur Karpukov; Quebec	Lasha Tsatsalashvili; Ontario	Félix Cyr; New Brunswick
Men's 73 kg	Arthur Karpukov; Quebec	Lasha Tsatsalashvili; Ontario	Zach Harris; British Columbia
Men's 81 kg	Tigran Kryvytskyi; Ontario	Habib Said Mohammad; Alberta	Louis Doyon; Quebec
Men's 81 kg	Tigran Kryvytskyi; Ontario	Habib Said Mohammad; Alberta	Daniel Ekosky; Manitoba
Men's +81 kg	John Jr. Messé À Bessong; Quebec	Lucas Macdonald; Prince Edward Island	Lucas Allen; Ontario
Men's +81 kg	John Jr. Messé À Bessong; Quebec	Lucas Macdonald; Prince Edward Island	Josiah Hallett; Saskatchewan
Men's team competition	Quebec	Ontario	Alberta
Men's team competition	Quebec	Ontario	British Columbia
Women's 44 kg	Marisol Savoie; New Brunswick	Maya Roy; Quebec	Not awarded
Women's 44 kg	Marisol Savoie; New Brunswick	Maya Roy; Quebec	Not awarded
Women's 48 kg	Charlize Isabelle Medilo; Alberta	Ekaterina Danilkov; British Columbia	Melody Grenier; Quebec
Women's 48 kg	Charlize Isabelle Medilo; Alberta	Ekaterina Danilkov; British Columbia	Addyson Tamura; Alberta
Women's 52 kg	Leanna Au; British Columbia	Isla Diesmos; Alberta	Laurence Gagnon; Quebec
Women's 52 kg	Leanna Au; British Columbia	Isla Diesmos; Alberta	Dilana Gesa; Ontario
Women's 57 kg	Catherine Toshkov; Quebec	Mahée Savoie; New Brunswick	Jaymi Hinchey; Yukon
Women's 57 kg	Catherine Toshkov; Quebec	Mahée Savoie; New Brunswick	Aliya Koliaska; Alberta
Women's 63 kg	Loïka Robertson; Quebec	Callie Render; Alberta	Margot Chevalier; Ontario
Women's 63 kg	Loïka Robertson; Quebec	Callie Render; Alberta	Dakota Sanzana; New Brunswick
Women's 70 kg	Kiera Burt; Ontario	Charline Bourque; Quebec	Maralgoo Batbayar; Alberta
Women's 70 kg	Kiera Burt; Ontario	Charline Bourque; Quebec	Abigail Smith; Nova Scotia
Women's +70 kg	Frédérique Lavigne; Quebec	Brandi Lingley; New Brunswick	Marianna Karas; Alberta
Women's +70 kg	Frédérique Lavigne; Quebec	Brandi Lingley; New Brunswick	Kandice Verge; Nova Scotia
Women's team competition	Quebec	Alberta	New Brunswick
Women's team competition	Quebec	Alberta	Ontario

=== Karate ===
Event	Gold	Silver	Bronze
Men's kata	Haruki Mori; British Columbia	Manic Noël; Quebec	Zac Chin; Ontario
Men's kata	Haruki Mori; British Columbia	Manic Noël; Quebec	Dylan Weiss; Alberta
Men's kumite 61 kg	Gassan Alkurdi; Nova Scotia	Evan Peddle; Nova Scotia	Nia Haftlang; British Columbia
Men's kumite 61 kg	Gassan Alkurdi; Nova Scotia	Evan Peddle; Nova Scotia	Helitha Rathnayake; Alberta
Men's kumite 68 kg	Ethan Tomusange; Alberta	Haruki Mori; British Columbia	Dorian Thibault; Nova Scotia
Men's kumite 68 kg	Ethan Tomusange; Alberta	Haruki Mori; British Columbia	Mohamed Ilbouche; Quebec
Men's kumite 68+ kg	Anton Gurin; Quebec	Omar Almishri; Alberta	Saad Eldlio; Nova Scotia
Men's kumite 68+ kg	Anton Gurin; Quebec	Omar Almishri; Alberta	James Joss; British Columbia
Women's kata	Oonah Gamboa; British Columbia	Liesel Munar; Ontario	Olivia Brodie; British Columbia
Women's kata	Oonah Gamboa; British Columbia	Liesel Munar; Ontario	Karna Kokame; Alberta
Women's kumite 53 kg	Olivia Brodie; British Columbia	Maroua Mokdad; Quebec	Lena Andres; British Columbia
Women's kumite 53 kg	Olivia Brodie; British Columbia	Maroua Mokdad; Quebec	Mikayla German; Nova Scotia
Women's kumite 59 kg	Donya Movaffagh; Alberta	Mélody Monfiston; Quebec	Ciara Browne; British Columbia
Women's kumite 59 kg	Donya Movaffagh; Alberta	Mélody Monfiston; Quebec	Denise Thibault; Nova Scotia
Women's kumite 59+ kg	Ella Crowle; British Columbia	Justine St-Jean; Quebec	Maisie Rathwell; Alberta
Women's kumite 59+ kg	Ella Crowle; British Columbia	Justine St-Jean; Quebec	Victoria Tam; Ontario

=== Ringette ===
Event	Gold	Silver	Bronze
Women's tournament	Julia Franco; Juliette Lessard; Amy Whyte; Maxim Moisan; Lili Moreau; Alex Violette; Zoe Aubin; Lauriane Alain; Maude Ouellet; Brittany Lanouette; Annie Trudel; Caroline Viola; Raphaëlle Chouinard; Florence Poulin; Allyson Savoie; Eléonore Sezia; Laurence Lacombe; Quebec	Mia Hemstreet; Mikyla Brewster; Kennedy Rice; Emily Dodd; Erin Ung; Kirsten Krochak; Cayleigh Hasell; Avery Kew; Kaleigh Ryan-York; Jamie Ferri; Kaeli Woodliffe; Rachael McKerracher; Sydnie Rock; Paige Roy; Regan Meier; Kaylee Armstrong; Jazmyn Fevin; Sydney Fevin; Alberta	Tobi Albert; Kylee Banerd; Rylie Bryden; Cadence Howe; Taylor Johnston; Ally Lenz; Leyna Matisz; Kaitlynn McCaw; Ella McLeod; Maddy Nystrom; Meagan Sanders; Lauren Schoenhofen; Brianna Shupe; Madeline Stang; Bailey Stangel; Bryn White; Shea White; Saskatchewan

=== Short track speed skating ===
Event	Gold		Silver		Bronze	
Men's 500 m	Adam Law; Ontario	43.673	Matthew Freitag; Ontario	43.791	Samuel Darveau; Quebec	43.881
Men's 1000 m	Justin Bessette; Quebec	1:36.752	Alexis Bélanger; Quebec	1:36.778	Max Poulin; Alberta	1:36.994
Men's 1500 m	Alexis Bélanger; Quebec	2:20.981	Max Poulin; Alberta	2:21.269	Samuel Darveau; Quebec	2:21.373
Men's 3000 m points race	Alexis Bélanger; Quebec	10,000 points	Gabriel Jones; Quebec	8,000 points	Samuel Darveau; Quebec	6,400 points
Men's relay	Gabriel Jones; Alexis Bélanger; Justin Bessette; Mathieu Charest; Samuel Darveau; Quebec	4:10.619	Charlie Cotton; Matthew Freitag; Marcelo Giansante; Helios He; Adam Law; Ontario	4:17.108	Zakhary Adelman; Cody Miller; Max Poulin; Ahmed Sbeiti; Ryan St.Rose; Alberta	4:21.355
Women's 500 m	Émanuelle Leclerc; Quebec	45.833	Kélian Quevillon; Quebec	45.833	Courtney Charlong; New Brunswick	47.430
Women's 1000 m	Émanuelle Leclerc; Quebec	1:43.936	Roselyne Pigeon; Quebec	1:44.020	Kélian Quevillon; Quebec	1:44.255
Women's 1500 m	Roselyne Pigeon; Quebec	2:26.581	Aaralyn McGill; Ontario	2:26.632	Alice Vaillancourt; Quebec	2:26.632
Women's 3000 m points race	Kélian Quevillon; Quebec	10,000 points	Émanuelle Leclerc; Quebec	8,000 points	Aaralyn McGill; Ontario	6,400 points
Women's team relay	Sherise Anne Gratton; Yilin Liao; Aaralyn McGill; Andria Scarpelli; Izabella Zakatsiolo; Ontario	4:30.106	Adelie Arvisais-Bacon; Émanuelle Leclerc; Roselyne Pigeon; Kélian Quevillon; Alice Vaillancourt; Quebec	4:35.080	Katie Bower; Courtney Charlong; Hannah MacDougall; Mya Payne; New Brunswick	4:40.039

=== Snowboarding ===
Event	Gold		Silver		Bronze	
Men's big air	Eli Bouchard; Quebec	188.60	Laurent Ethier; Quebec	180.80	Tosh Krauskopf; British Columbia	177.60
Men's parallel giant slalom	Luis Keesmaat Freeman; Ontario		Gabriel Wood; Ontario		Olivier Gagné; Quebec	
Men's slopestyle	Eli Bouchard; Quebec	87.67	Tosh Krauskopf; British Columbia	85.13	Laurent Ethier; Quebec	84.67
Men's snowboard cross	Kai Hooper; British Columbia		Anthony Shelly; British Columbia		Olivier Gagné; Quebec	
Women's big air	Billy Pelchat; British Columbia	163.40	Juliette Vallerand; Quebec	160.60	Felicity Geremia; Alberta	102.00
Women's parallel giant slalom	Bridget MacLean; Nova Scotia		Felicity Geremia; Alberta		Rose Savard-Ferguson; Quebec	
Women's slopestyle	Billy Pelchat; British Columbia	83.67	Juliette Vallerand; Quebec	78.80	Avery Spalding; Ontario	63.00
Women's snowboard cross	Hannah Turkington; British Columbia		Arianne Gallant; Quebec		Billy Pelchat; British Columbia	

=== Squash ===
Event	Gold	Silver	Bronze
Men's singles	Jacob Lin; British Columbia	Karim Michael; Quebec	Daniel Deverill; Ontario
Men's team	Roman Luke Bicknell; Jacob Lin; Weihan Wang; Harrison Yang; British Columbia	Daniel Deverill; Jack Jones; Wasey Maqsood; Sebastian Singodia; Ontario	Sam Boulanger; Michael Knapp; Murdoch Morrison; Rohan Paliwal; Alberta
Women's singles	Ocean Ma; British Columbia	Spring Ma; British Columbia	Iman Shaheen; Ontario
Women's team	Hermione Cao; Ocean Ma; Spring Ma; Maria Min; British Columbia	Maya Askari; Ashley Hall; Ananya Maheshwari; Iman Shaheen; Ontario	Maddison Laine; Antonella Rodriguez; Romina Rodriguez; Ella Watson; Alberta

=== Speed skating ===
Event	Gold		Silver		Bronze	
Men's 500 m	Jalen Doan; Alberta	36.88	Yankun Zhao; Alberta	37.08	Zacharie Després; Quebec	38.12
Men's 1000 m	Jalen Doan; Alberta	1:17.53	Yankun Zhao; Alberta	1:18.23	Luca Veeman; Saskatchewan	1:18.36
Men's 1500 m	Jalen Doan; Alberta	1:57.76	Luca Veeman; Saskatchewan	1:58.49	Zacharie Després; Quebec	2:00.03
Men's 5000 m	Daniel Hall; Alberta	7:15.31	Bon Lowe; Saskatchewan	7:27.31	Luca Veeman; Saskatchewan	7:33.97
Men's mass start	Luca Veeman; Saskatchewan		Jalen Doan; Alberta		Zacharie Després; Quebec	
Men's team pursuit	Raphaël Côté; Zacharie Després; Antoine Hamel; Félix Larochelle; Quebec	4:16.55	Fergus Owen English; Bon Lowe; Daniel Pauli; Luca Veeman; Saskatchewan	4:17.14	Jalen Doan; Andre Erasmus; Daniel Hall; Yankun Zhao; Alberta	4:19.31
Women's 500 m	Sofia Bieber; Manitoba	42.25	Maya Lueders; Alberta	42.76	Camille Tremblay; Quebec	43.49
Women's 1000 m	Sofia Bieber; Manitoba	1:28.14	Cloé Jelonek; Quebec	1:29.36	Maya Lueders; Alberta	1:30.10
Women's 1500 m	Isabelle Champagne; Alberta	2:33.22	Sofia Bieber; Manitoba	2:33.44	Serena Dallaire; Saskatchewan	2:37.43
Women's 3000 m	Isabelle Champagne; Alberta	4:51.37	Rachel Mallard; Ontario	4:59.15	Serena Dallaire; Saskatchewan	4:59.66
Women's mass start	Sofia Bieber; Manitoba		Emilie Greenfield; Quebec		Isabelle Champagne; Alberta	
Women's team pursuit	Ariane Fournier; Emilie Greenfield; Cloé Jelonek; Camille Tremblay; Quebec	3:49.78	Sofia Bieber; Robyn Salie; Lindsay Smart; Skylar Van Horne; Manitoba	3:57.55	Isabelle Champagne; Tatiana de Vlieg; Maya Lueders; Zoe Lueders; Alberta	3:58.47

=== Table tennis ===
Event	Gold	Silver	Bronze
Men's singles	Siméon Martin; Quebec	Joakim Desmeules; Quebec	Kevin Guo; Ontario
Men's doubles	Joakim Desmeules; Siméon Martin; Quebec	Jordan Grewal; Kevin Guo; Ontario	Hannah Zhangi; David Mandelstam; British Columbia
Men's team	Joakim Desmeules; Siméon Martin; Quebec	Jordan Grewal; Kevin Guo; Ontario	Terry Li; David Mandelstam; British Columbia
Women's singles	Jessie Xu; Ontario	Demi Cai; Ontario	Sofia Li; British Columbia
Women's doubles	Demi Cai; Jessie Xu; Ontario	Victoria Lee; Grace Qi; Manitoba	Nelina Murdanaigum; Alice Provencher; Quebec
Women's team	Demi Cai; Jessie Xu; Ontario	Nelina Murdanaigum; Alice Provencher; Quebec	Sofia Li; Louise Fan; British Columbia
Mixed doubles	Alice Provencher; Siméon Martin; Quebec	Jessie Xu; Kevin Guo; Ontario	Sofia Li; David Mandelstam; British Columbia

=== Wheelchair basketball ===
Event	Gold	Silver	Bronze
Mixed tournament	Megan Smith; Keaton MacEachern; Lannette Boland; Matthew Norris; Elise Froese; Ben Hagkull; Ben Garrett; Nicholas van Bakel; Joel Ewert; Gabe Harrison; Jeffer Ward; Joel Aukema; British Columbia	Sydney Poapst; Ceilidh Nordell; Jayna Doll; Saheed Alawiye; Katie Bajema; Parker Cooke; Hayes Cooke; Reed De'Aeth; Jalen Shannon; Anika Guillaume; Anikka Cassidy; Sam Villeneuve; Alberta	Charlie Parent; Gaby Noël; Coralie Grondin; Vincent Noël; Collin Lalonde; Étienne Audibert; Alex Bougie; Lionel Tamoki; Gabriel Giguere; Kévin Giguère; Aurélie Jacob-Verreault; Tristan Lessard; Quebec
