= Hope Gordon =

British Para canoeist and Para Nordic skier

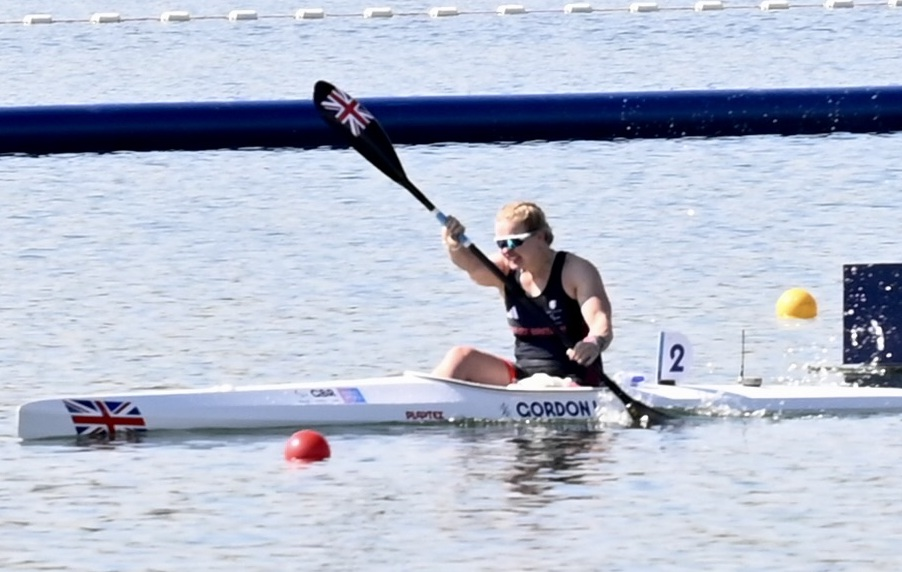
- Gordon at the 2024 Summer Paralympics

Personal information
- Born: 4 November 1994 (age 31) Golspie, Scotland
- Home town: Rogart, Scotland
- Education: Edinburgh Napier University; Forth Valley College

Sport
- Country: Great Britain
- Sport: Para canoe Para Nordic skiing Para powerlifting
- Disability: Leg amputation due to CRPS
- Disability class: KL3 (canoe); LW12 (skiing)
Medal record
Women's Para canoe
Representing Great Britain
Event	1st	2nd	3rd
Paralympic Games	0	1	0
World Championships	4	5	1
European Championships	2	2	1
Total	6	8	2
Paralympic Games
Silver medal – second place	2024 Paris	VL3
World Championships
Gold medal – first place	2023 Duisburg	VL3
Gold medal – first place	2025 Milan	VL3
Gold medal – first place	2026 Poznán	KL3
Gold medal – first place	2026 Poznán	VL3
Silver medal – second place	2021 Copenhagen	KL3
Silver medal – second place	2021 Copenhagen	VL3
Silver medal – second place	2022 Dartmouth	VL3
Silver medal – second place	2024 Szeged	KL3
Silver medal – second place	2024 Szeged	VL3
Bronze medal – third place	2025 MIlan	KL3
European Championships
Gold medal – first place	2025 Racice	VL3
Gold medal – first place	2026 Montemor-o-Velho	KL3
Silver medal – second place	2022 Munich	VL3
Silver medal – second place	2026 Montemor-o-Velho	VL3
Bronze medal – third place	2022 Munich	KL3

Hope Gordon (born 4 November 1994) is a British Para canoeist and Para Nordic skier. She competed at the 2022 Winter Paralympics becoming Great Britain's first ever female para Nordic skier. She is a four-time World champion gold medalist in paracanoe. Gordon was selected by Scotland to take part in the heavyweight para powerlifting competition at the 2026 Commonwealth Games, becoming her third international representative sport.

== Career ==
Gordon had her left leg amputated above the knee in 2016 following her diagnosis of complex regional pain syndrome four years earlier. She started Paralympic swimming after recovering from her operation, she had missed out a place to compete at the 2018 Commonwealth Games, she switched to paracanoe after seeing a canoeing advert looking for talented athletes and was encouraged by Paralympic swimmer Charlotte Henshaw who was also a swimmer turned paracanoeist. She finished fourth in her debut competition in Poznań at the 2019 Paracanoe European Championships, she won her first medals at the 2021 ICF Canoe Sprint World Championships by winning two silver medals in both the kayak and canoe events.

Gordon made her debut Paralympic appearance at the 2022 Winter Paralympics, she finished 16th in the middle distance and 17th in the sprint cross country. She described the snowy conditions as 'mashed tatties' at Zhangjiakou where the skiing event was held.
