= 2022 ICF Canoe Sprint World Championships – Women's VL3 =

Women's VL3 at the 2022 ICF Canoe Sprint World Championships
- Venue: Lake Banook
- Location: Dartmouth, Canada
- Dates: 3–5 August
- Competitors: 12 from 11 nations
- Winning time: 59.58

Medalists
gold medal	Charlotte Henshaw	Great Britain
silver medal	Hope Gordon	Great Britain
bronze medal	Mari Santilli	Brazil

The women's VL3 competition at the 2022 ICF Canoe Sprint World Championships in Dartmouth took place on Lake Banook.

== Schedule ==
The schedule was as follows:

Date	Time	Round
Wednesday 3 August 2022	10:45	Heats
Wednesday 3 August 2022	15:05	Semifinal
Friday 5 August 2022	11:44	Final

All times are Atlantic Daylight Time (UTC−3)

== Results ==
=== Heats ===
The fastest three boats in each heat advanced directly to the final.
The next four fastest boats in each heat, plus the fastest remaining boat advanced to the semifinal.

==== Heat 1 ====
Rank	Canoeist	Country	Time	Notes
1	Charlotte Henshaw	Great Britain	59.89	QF
2	Mari Santilli	Brazil	1:04.62	QF
3	Erica Scarff	Canada	1:05.42	QF
4	Mukhlisa Eshmirzaeva	Uzbekistan	1:05.57	QS
5	Amy Ralph	Australia	1:08.33	QS
6	Shiho Miyajima	Japan	1:28.39	QS

==== Heat 2 ====
Rank	Canoeist	Country	Time	Notes
1	Hope Gordon	Great Britain	1:00.62	QF
2	Nataliia Lagutenko	Ukraine	1:03.82	QF
3	Jillian Elwart	United States	1:07.73	QF
4	Talia Eilat	Israel	1:12.46	QS
5	Bosede Omoboni	Nigeria	1:17.07	QS
6	Julianna Tóth	Hungary	1:17.43	QS

=== Semifinal ===
The fastest three boats advanced to the final.

Rank	Canoeist	Country	Time	Notes
1	Mukhlisa Eshmirzaeva	Uzbekistan	1:08.91	QF
2	Amy Ralph	Australia	1:10.72	QF
3	Talia Eilat	Israel	1:14.31	QF
4	Bosede Omoboni	Nigeria	1:17.64	
5	Julianna Tóth	Hungary	1:20.08	
6	Shiho Miyajima	Japan	1:35.20	

=== Final ===
Competitors raced for positions 1 to 9, with medals going to the top three.

Rank	Name	Country	Time
1st place, gold medalist(s)	Charlotte Henshaw	Great Britain	59.58
2nd place, silver medalist(s)	Hope Gordon	Great Britain	1:00.84
3rd place, bronze medalist(s)	Mari Santilli	Brazil	1:03.97
4	Erica Scarff	Canada	1:04.43
5	Nataliia Lagutenko	Ukraine	1:05.29
6	Mukhlisa Eshmirzaeva	Uzbekistan	1:06.34
7	Jillian Elwart	United States	1:06.68
8	Amy Ralph	Australia	1:08.63
9	Talia Eilat	Israel	1:12.10
