= 2023 ICF Canoe Sprint World Championships – Women's VL3 =

Women's VL3 at the 2023 ICF Canoe Sprint World Championships
- Venue: Sportpark Duisburg
- Location: Duisburg, Germany
- Dates: 23–25 August
- Competitors: 17 from 13 nations
- Winning time: 56.199

Medalists
gold medal	Hope Gordon	Great Britain
silver medal	Erica Scarff	Canada
bronze medal	Mari Santilli	Brazil

The women's VL3 competition at the 2023 ICF Canoe Sprint World Championships in Duisburg took place at Sportpark Duisburg.

== Schedule ==
The schedule was as follows:

Date	Time	Round
Wednesday 23 August 2023	11:10	Heats
Friday 25 August 2023	12:57	Semifinal
Friday 25 August 2023	17:38	Final

All times are Central European Summer Time (UTC+2)

== Results ==
=== Heats ===
The fastest three boats in each heat advanced directly to the final.
The next four fastest boats in each heat, plus the fastest remaining boat advanced to the semifinal.

==== Heat 1 ====
Rank	Name	Country	Time	Notes
1	Hope Gordon	Great Britain	56.760	QF
2	Jillian Elwart	United States	59.716	QF
3	Zhong Yongyuan	China	1:00.013	QF
4	Nataliia Lagutenko	Ukraine	1:00.890	QS
5	Erisangela Toniolo	Brazil	1:02.158	QS
6	Elea Charvet	France	1:02.622	QS
7	Monika Kukla	Poland	1:03.755	QS
8	Sangeeta Rajput	India	1:09.850	qS
–	Shakhzoda Mamadalieva	Uzbekistan	DNF	

==== Heat 2 ====
Rank	Name	Country	Time	Notes
1	Erica Scarff	Canada	58.210	QF
2	Mari Santilli	Brazil	59.297	QF
3	Zhanyl Baltabayeva	Kazakhstan	1:02.391	QF
4	Amy Ralph	Australia	1:04.596	QS
5	Justyna Regucka	Poland	1:06.016	QS
6	Shabana	India	1:09.748	QS
7	Shiho Miyajima	Japan	1:14.647	QS
–	Quan Zicui	China	DSQ	

=== Semifinal ===
The fastest three boats advanced to the final.

Rank	Name	Country	Time	Notes
1	Nataliia Lagutenko	Ukraine	1:01.805	QF
2	Elea Charvet	France	1:02.077	QF
3	Erisangela Toniolo	Brazil	1:02.229	QF
4	Amy Ralph	Australia	1:05.330	
5	Justyna Regucka	Poland	1:05.884	
6	Monika Kukla	Poland	1:06.236	
7	Shabana	India	1:09.023	
8	Sangeeta Rajput	India	1:09.067	
9	Shiho Miyajima	Japan	1:13.350	

=== Final ===
Competitors raced for positions 1 to 9, with medals going to the top three.

Rank	Name	Country	Time
1st place, gold medalist(s)	Hope Gordon	Great Britain	56.199
2nd place, silver medalist(s)	Erica Scarff	Canada	57.582
3rd place, bronze medalist(s)	Mari Santilli	Brazil	59.232
4	Jillian Elwart	United States	1:00.503
5	Zhong Yongyuan	China	1:00.847
6	Nataliia Lagutenko	Ukraine	1:01.592
7	Elea Charvet	France	1:01.650
8	Zhanyl Baltabayeva	Kazakhstan	1:02.612
9	Erisangela Toniolo	Brazil	1:02.687
