= Úrsula Pueyo =

Spanish para-alpine skier

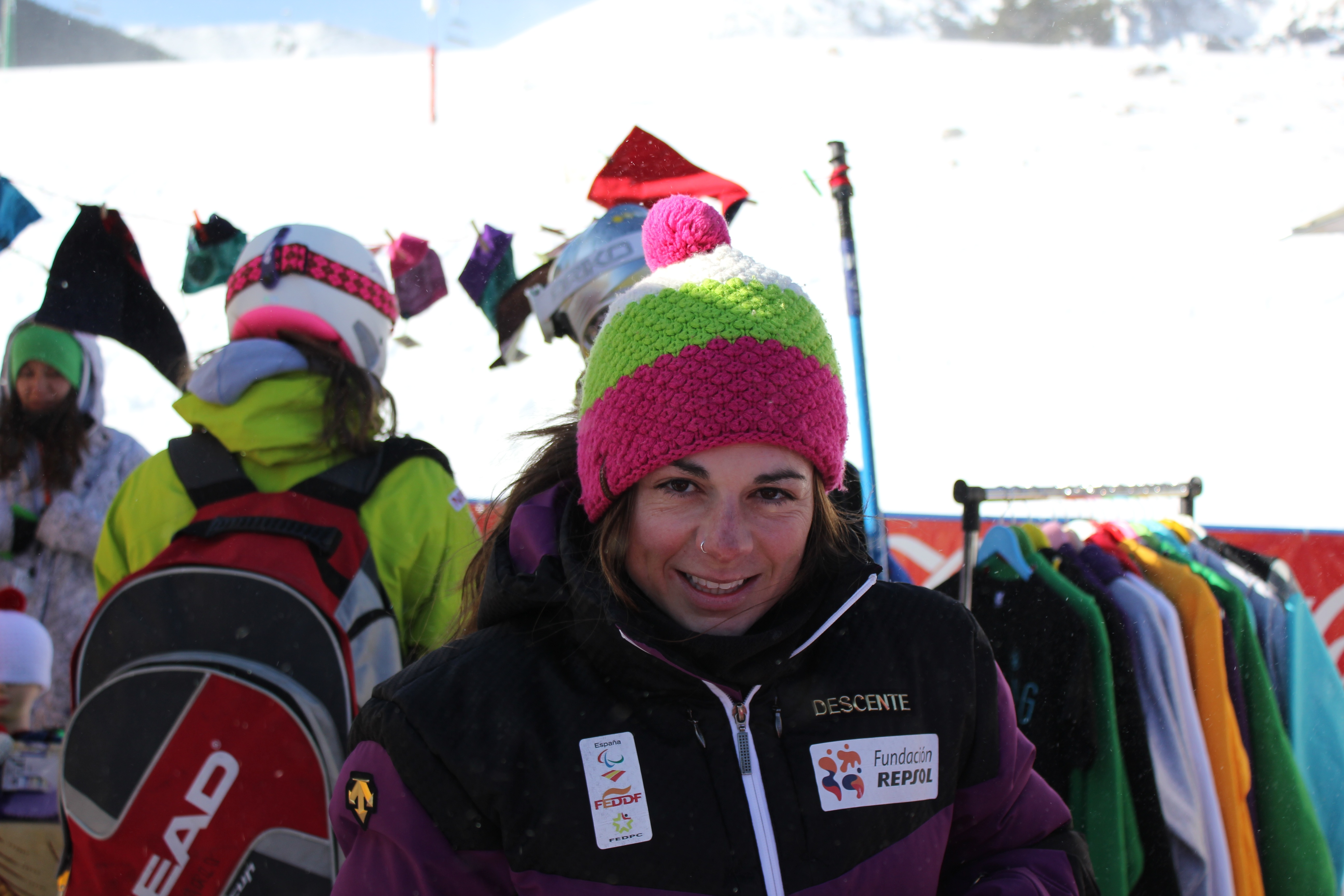
- Pueyo at La Molina, Spain, 2013.

Personal information
- Full name: Úrsula Pueyo Marimon
- Nationality: Spanish
- Born: 21 December 1983 (age 42) Palma de Mallorca, Spain

Sport
- Country: Spain
- Sport: Para-alpine skiing
- Events: Downhill; Slalom; Giant slalom Super combined Super G

Úrsula Pueyo Marimon (born 21 December 1983 in Palma de Mallorca) is a LW2 classified Spanish para-alpine standing skier who is missing a leg. She has competed in IPC Alpine Skiing World Cup and European Cup events. She has also competed at the IPC Alpine Skiing World Championships, the 2010 Winter Paralympics, and the Sochi 2014 Paralympic Winter Games.

== Personal ==
From Majorca, Pueyo has a physical disability, a missing leg, that is the result of a motor vehicle accident when she was fifteen years old.

== Skiing ==
Pueyo is a LW2 skier. who competes in the standing category. She is coached by Andrés Gómez.

At the last round of the European Cup in March 2008, an event held in La Molina, Spain, Pueyo was one of several non-vision impaired Spanish skiers competing at the event. She finished the 2007/2008 European Cup season in tenth place. She finished the 2007/2008 European Cup season in tenth place. At the first IPC Alpine Skiing World Cup event in the 2008/2009 ski season, she failed to finish one of her races. At the February 2009 Paralympic World Cup I event, she earned three silver medals and a bronze medal. In March 2009, she competed at the European Cup alpine skiing for the disabled. She completed her runs but did not medal, finishing fourth overall with 458 points. Competing at the 2009 IPC Alpine Skiing World Championships in South Korea, she was disqualified in her first run in one event. In another race, she finished 28th. It was the first World Championship she had competed in. In November 2009, she attended an event in Madrid organised by Programa de Alto Rendimiento Paralímpico (Programa ARPA) as part of the preparation for the Vancouver Games. Following this, she participated in additional team training at Centro de Deportes de Invierno del Valle de Arán (Lérida). The Campionat de Catalunya Open d'Esquí Alpí took place in late January 2010 with skiers representing the five regions of Spain including Aragon, Galicia, Catalonia, Madrid and the Basque Country. She represented Catalonia as a member of the ski club, MAC, and came in first in the standing category events. She finished fourth in the slalom event at the third European Cup event held in La Molina in late January 2010. At Aramón Cerler in April 2010, the last competition of the season that was organised by Campeonato de España de Esquí Alpino adaptado was held. She finished first in the Super G women's sitting event.

Before departing for 2010 Winter Paralympics in Vancouver, Pueyo participated in a departure ceremony attended by State Secretary for Sport Jaime Lissavetzky, secretary general of Social Policy Francisco Moza, the President of the Spanish Paralympic Committee Miguel Carballeda, and managing director of the Spanish Paralympic Committee Alberto Jofre. The whole Spanish team arrived in Whistler ahead of the 2010 Games by 7 February. Pueyo was the only Spanish team member with a physical disability and not competing in the visually impaired class. The 2010 Games were her first. Her youth was one of the contributing factors in being chosen for the 2010 Paralympic team as the Spanish Paralympic Committee believed investing in her then would result in a skier who would be around for several Paralympic Games. Fog in Vancouver resulted in a change in scheduling for her ski events. She fell down in the slalom event and was thus disqualified. In the giant slalom event, she was disqualified for exiting before regulation tie. Following the Games, the Spanish Paralympic team attended a welcome back celebration at the ONCE Foundation that was also attended by Infanta Elena, Duchess of Lugo.

Pueyo participated in Spanish national team competition from 5 to 7 April 2010 in Vancouver. It was organised by the Federación Española de Deportes de Personas con Discapacidad Física (FEDDF), Federación Española de Deportes para Paralíticos Cerebrales (FEDPC) and Federación Española de Deportes para Ciegos (FEDC). She competed in a November 2010 ski competition in Landgraaf, Netherlands where she earned a silver medal in the downhill event. In December 2010, she competed in the second stage of the European Cup with at a competition in Austria. At the 2011 World Championships held in Sestriere, Italy, she failed to finish in the slalom event. In October 2011, she underwent medical tests at the CSD Sports Council in Madrid. As part of the trip to Madrid, she also visited the indoor snow zone at Madrid Xanadu shopping center where she participated in several training sessions. In November 2011, she was classified at an event in the Netherlands. While there, she also worked on improving her performance by training for the slalom at an indoor ski venue in the country at a camp attended by 100 skiers from fifteen countries. In 2011, she moved to Aran for the 2011/2012 ski season in order to be based at the Centro de Deportes de Invierno Adaptados. She participated in the 2012 Los Campeonatos de España de Esquí held in Valle de Arán, where the slalom, giant slalom and Super G events were contested. She earned three gold medals at the competition. Near the end of the 2011/2012 ski season, she participated in a World Cup event in Italy where she finished ninth in the giant slalom event in the women's standing group.

Pueyo was a competitor in the Sochi 2014 Paralympic Winter Games, finishing the women's giant slalom – standing in 11th place.
