= Andrea Hegen =

German Paralympic athlete

Medal record

Paralympic athletics

Representing Germany

Paralympic Games
Silver medal – second place	2008 Beijing	Javelin Throw – F42-46
Bronze medal – third place	2004 Athens	Javelin Throw - F42-46

Andrea Hegen is a Paralympian athlete from Germany competing mainly in category F42-46 javelin throw events.

She competed in the 2004 Summer Paralympics in Athens, Greece. There she won a bronze medal in the women's F42-46 javelin throw event.

She competed in the 2008 Summer Paralympics in Beijing, China. There she went one better winning a silver medal in the women's F42-46 javelin throw event.
