= Marjaana Väre =

Medal record

Track and field (athletics)

Representing Finland

Paralympic Games
Gold medal – first place	2004 Athens	Javelin Throw - F42-46

Marjaana Väre (born 10 January 1967, in Helsinki) is a Paralympian athlete from Finland competing as a swimmer and in the category F42-46 javelin events. She won a gold medal

== Career ==
Väre has competed in 4 Paralympics in two different sports. She first competed in 1992 in Barcelona in various swimming events but failed to win any medals. It was the same story in Atlanta in 1996. After missing the 2000 games she returned in 2004 in the Athletics events and won a gold medal in the F42-46 javelin as well as competing in the discus. Four years later, however she was unable to defend her title coming away with nothing from the F42-46 javelin.
