= Natalia Gudkova =

Russian Paralympic athlete

Medal record

Women's para-athletics

Representing Russia

Paralympic Games
Gold medal – first place	2000 Sydney	Javelin Throw - F46
Silver medal – second place	2004 Athens	Javelin Throw - F42-46
Silver medal – second place	2012 London	Javelin Throw - F46
Bronze medal – third place	1996 Atlanta	Javelin Throw - F42-44/46

Natalia Goudkova (née Kletskova) is a Paralympian athlete from Russia competing mainly in category F46 throwing events.

== Career ==
Natalia competed as part of the Russian team that travelled to the United States for the 1996 Summer Paralympics where she competed in all three throws winning the bronze medal in the javelin. In the 2000 Summer Paralympics in Sydney she won a gold medal in the F46 javelin as well as competing in the F46 discus, shot put and long jump. In Athens at the 2004 Summer Paralympics she narrowly missed out defending her javelin title in the mixed class F42-36 javelin, coming away with the silver medal and again failing in the F42-46 discus.
