= Zhong Yongyuan =

Chinese Para athlete and canoeist (born 1985)

Personal information
- Born: 1 March 1985 (age 41)

Sport
- Country: China
- Sport: Para athletics Para canoe
- Disability class: F42-F46 (Para athletics); VL3 (Para canoe)
Medal record
Representing China
Women's Para athletics
Paralympic Games
Silver medal – second place	2008 Beijing	Shot Put F42-46
Women's Para canoe
Paralympic Games
Bronze medal – third place	2024 Paris	VL3
World Championships
Silver medal – second place	2026 Poznán	VL3

Zhong Yongyuan (born 1 March 1985)is a Chinese Para athlete and canoeist.

== Career ==
She competed in the 2008 Summer Paralympics in Beijing, China. There she won a silver medal in the women's F42-46 shot put event. She also finished eighth in the women's F42-46 javelin throw.
